= Rock 'n' Roll Circus =

- CD only artwork

Studio album by Ayumi Hamasaki
- Released: April 14, 2010
- Recorded: 2009–2010
- Studios: Tokyo, Japan and London, England
- Genre: Rock
- Length: 62:08
- Labels: Avex Entertainment; Avex Trax
- Producer: Max Matsuura

Ayumi Hamasaki chronology
Next Level (2009)	Rock 'n' Roll Circus (2010)	Love Songs (2010)

Singles from Rock 'n' Roll Circus
- 1. "Sunrise/Sunset (Love Is All)" Released: August 12, 2009; 2. "You Were.../Ballad" Released: December 29, 2009

Rock 'n' Roll Circus is the eleventh studio album by Japanese recording artist Ayumi Hamasaki. It was released on April 14, 2010, by Avex Trax. It was also released just a little over a year after her 2009 album, Next Level. Rock 'n' Roll Circus marks Hamasaki's eleventh consecutive album to be fully produced by Japanese producer and manager Max Matsuura, while she contributes to the album as the lead vocalist, background vocalist, and songwriter to all songs. Recorded in Japanese with minor phrases in English, Rock 'n' Roll Circus is a rock album with numerous musical elements such as electropop, J-pop, rock, pop ballad, and dance music.

Rock 'n' Roll Circus was recorded in Japan and the United Kingdom, making it Hamasaki's first album recorded outside of her native country. Additional production was handled in the United States and the two prior countries. Five different formats were released to promote the album: a standalone CD, a CD and DVD bundle, a limited edition box set, a limited edition Playbutton, and a digital release worldwide. Two different artworks were issued for the album's cover sleeve; one has Hamasaki inside a telephone box, while the second sleeve has a close-up of Hamasaki's face.

Upon the album's release, it was met with mixed to favourable reviews from music critics. Critics commended the album's approach to rock music, alongside its commercial appeal and music consistency. However, some noted the lack of emotional delivery in Hamasaki's lyrics, while criticizing the album's ballads and production. Rock 'n' Roll Circus was listed by several critics as one of the best albums of 2010. Commercially, Rock 'n' Roll Circus was a success. It became Hamasaki's tenth album to reach the top spot on Japan's Oricon Albums Chart, and was certified platinum by the Recording Industry Association of Japan (RIAJ) for shipments of 250,000 units. The album charted on Korea's Gaon Album Chart and Taiwan's G-Music Albums Chart.

Two singles were released from Rock 'n' Roll Circus, including one promotional. Its lead a-side single "Sunrise/Sunset (Love Is All)" was a commercial success, peaking at number one on the Japanese Oricon Singles Chart and two on the Japan Hot 100 chart. The album's second and final a-side single, "You Were.../Ballad", was a commercial success; it peaked at number one on the Japanese Oricon Singles Chart and 14 on the Japan Hot 100 chart. The album's only promotional single, "Microphone", reached number 33 on the RIAJ Digital Track Chart. Several other album tracks charted on competent charts in Japan. Hamasaki promoted the album on her 2010 Rock 'n' Roll Circus tour.

== Background and development ==
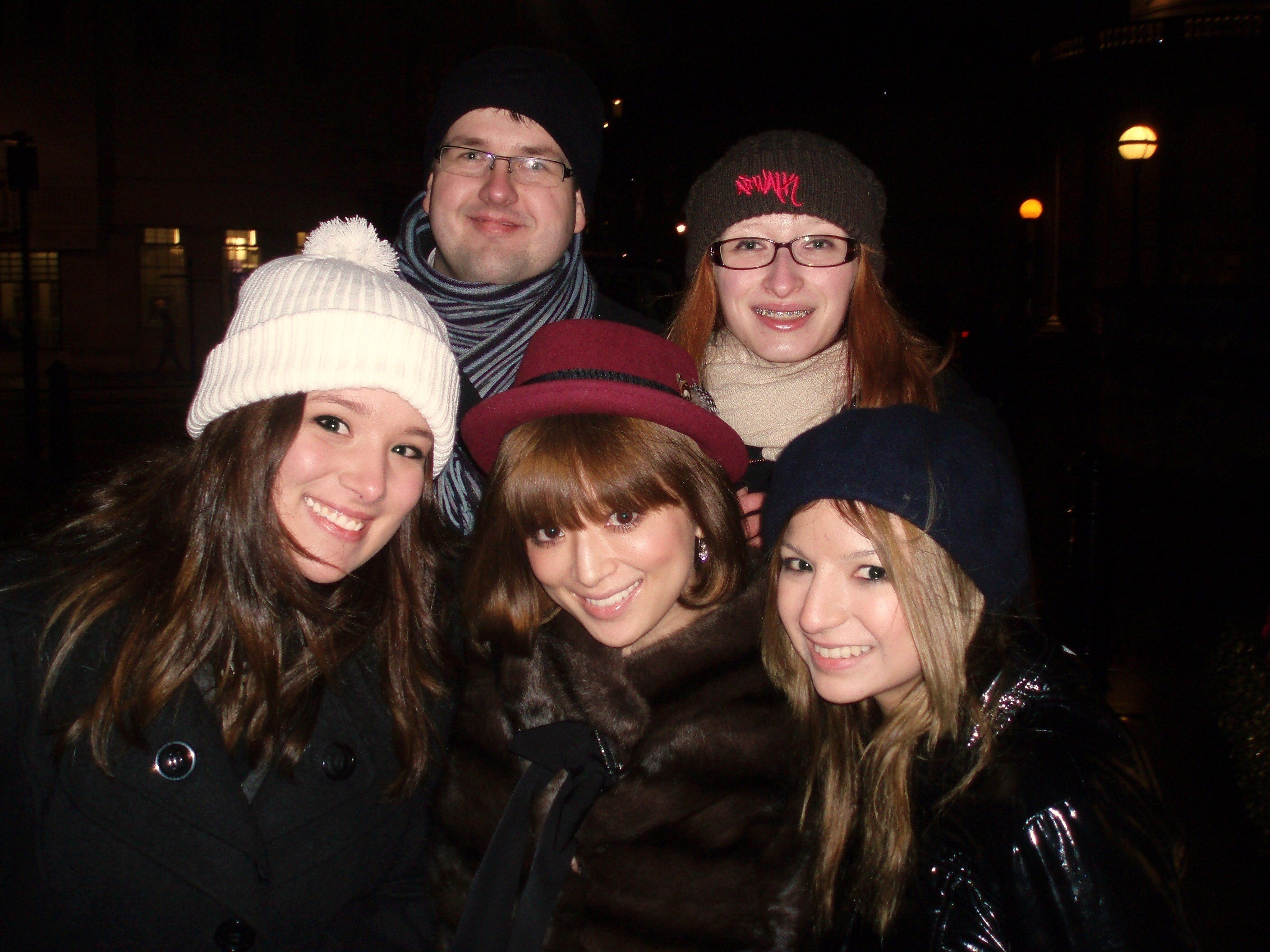
Rock 'n' Roll Circus was recorded in both Tokyo and London; Hamasaki (bottom center) in London with a group of European fans.

In March 2010, it was confirmed by Hamasaki and her record label Avex Trax that she would release a then-upcoming studio album titled Rock 'n' Roll Circus. Hamasaki and Avex Trax enlisted a long-term collaborator, Japanese businessman and producer Max Matsuura, to produce the album; this marked Hamasaki's eleventh consecutive album to be fully produced by Matsuura. Hamasaki began recording the album at Avex Studios and Prime Sound Studios in Japan around mid-2009 with Kōji Morimoto, Yūichi Nagayama, and Masashi Hashimoto. Hamasaki briefly moved to London, United Kingdom, to record the remaining material of the album with Dom Morley and Phill Brown. This marks Hamasaki's first album to have been recorded outside of Japan; she carried on recording her 2012 album Party Queen in London, which is her final album recorded in that region.

The material from Rock 'n' Roll Circus was produced and recorded over a year and one month, one of Hamasaki's longer spanning projects to date. Hamasaki and Avex enlisted previous composers and arrangers for the album, such as CMJK, Tetsuya Yukumi, Yuta Nakano, and Kazuhiro Hara; these composers and arrangers started working with Hamasaki back on her 2002 album Rainbow and 2004 My Story. Several instruments from the album were directed by British musicians and arrangers; tracks "Microphone" and "Montage" were performed by the London String Machine group and other British instrumentalists. Hamasaki was interviewed in the May 2010 issue of Japan's magazine Bea's Up, and stated about her experiences in the UK;

"The reason why I chose to do the recording in London this time was because I wanted to make an album in a closed-off environment, sort of like a place where sunlight doesn't reach. The songs this time are like me. They're not liberal and open-minded. The songs which I've always made often share the same views and ideas as the listener, but this time, they're more like shouts and prayers from my individual innermost self. With this image, I've probably gotten closer to how I was like inside when I first debuted. What I do in America has always been liberal and open, so that's why I chose London this time instead ..."

== Composition ==
Rock 'n' Roll Circus is a rock music album which includes numerous musical elements of electropop, J-pop, rock, pop ballad, and dance music. In an interview with Japanese magazine S Cawaii, Hamasaki said that "[Rock 'n' Roll Circus] ... basically has a feeling of "back-to-basics." A feeling of Ayumi Hamasaki, and less of adventure. More digging down into the foundation. Which isn't to say I'm taking a step backward. It's about expressing my feelings on things I've always liked, but as the person I am now."

According to AllMusic editor Alexey Eremenko, "Rock'n'Roll Circus is pretty versatile: there are a couple of pop/rock tracks, a Middle Eastern techno tune, a playful plastic pop song, even a jungle interlude, and, of course, a slew of epic, string-drenched ballads that no J-pop singer seems to be able to resist performing". Greg from Selective Hearing stated that the album's material showed more "restraint" than her previous music; "There is a deliberate pacing that entices the listener to stick around. You don't get hammered over the head". Asian Junkie editor Random J reviewed the album on his personal blog, and noticed the music and themes for Rock 'n' Roll Circus were more consistent than her previous albums. Tetsuo Hiraga from Hot Express noted the album's "formulaic rock music".

Each song from Rock 'n' Roll Circus was written by Hamasaki, including the Japanese, English, and interlude tracks. Only two songs from the album; "Microphone" and "Don't Look Back", are recorded in Japanese with minor phrases of English. (Note: According to the lyrical booklet provided by Avex Trax, Avex Korea, and Avex Hong Kong, "Microphone" (the lyrics "Tell me why ... I don't know ... I won't tell u why") and "Don't Look Back" (the words "Don't look back") are the only tracks with any English language.) The album includes three jungle-influenced interludes: "The Introduction", "Montage", and "Jump". Rock music is present throughout the tracks, "Microphone", "Count Down", "Last Links", "Lady Dynamite", "Sunrise (Love Is All)", and "Red Line (TA)". Other musical elements, including Middle Eastern music in "Don't Look Back", electropop in "Sexy Little Things", and pop ballad melodies in "You Were...", "Meaning of Love", "Ballad", and "Sunset" are present throughout the album. The songs "Sunrise" and "Sunset" have the same lyrics, but different music arrangements and vocal performances from Hamasaki.

== Release and packaging ==
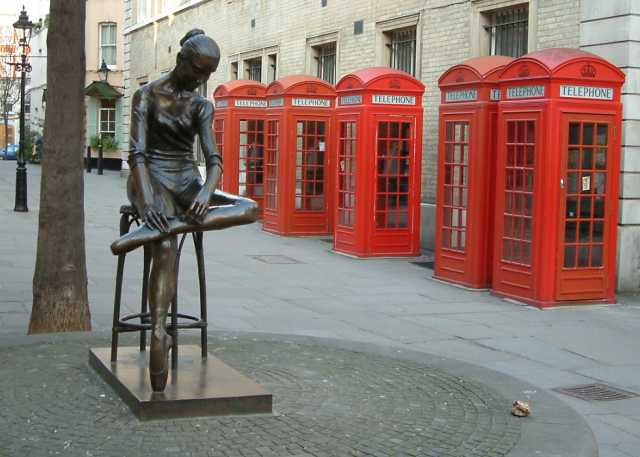
The red telephone boxes in Covent Garden, London, the location where Hamasaki shot the album cover and booklet artwork.

Rock 'n' Roll Circus was released in four different formats on April 14, 2010, by Avex Trax, a little over a year after her 2009 album, Next Level. Rock 'n' Roll Circus became Hamasaki's third two-album set alongside Love Songs (2010) to be released in a single year; Hamasaki's first and second two album sets to do this were A Song for ×× and Loveppears in 1999, and (Miss)understood and Secret in 2006. To date, it remains Hamasaki's last two-album release in a single year.

Rock 'n' Roll Circus first format, the stand-alone CD, features the fifteen tracks in a jewel case, with first press editions including an obi and a bonus poster. Hamasaki was dressed in Moschino clothing for the photo shoots. Members from Hamasaki's fan club received a bonus track, "Moon". The CD and DVD package features the fifteen tracks, and a bonus DVD with the music videos to "Sunrise", "Sunset", "You Were...", "Ballad", "Sexy Little Things", "Microphone", "Don't Look Back", and "Lady Dynamite". The DVD also included behind the scenes videos for both music videos, and a live performance by Hamasaki on her 2009 Next Level Tour. A limited edition box set format features the fifteen tracks, and a bonus DVD including the same music videos. The box set also includes behind the scenes videos for both music videos, and the live DVD by Hamasaki on her 2009 Next Level Tour. The box set includes goods: a mug, a bag, red tea, and a limited edition photo album. The final format is the worldwide digital release. Twelve limited copies of Rock 'n' Roll Circus feature the hand-written lyrics to each song, and an autograph sheet from Hamasaki.

All four cover sleeves for Rock 'n' Roll Circus were photographed by photographer and designer ND Chow. The standalone CD artwork has Hamasaki holding the door to a red telephone box in Covent Garden, London, with the album title and her name superimposed on the booth. This marks Hamasaki's third album cover to be photographed and directed outside of Japan, after Loveppears and (Miss)understood. The CD and music video DVD formats have a close-up of Hamasaki's face, with parts of the British flag design across her face. The box set is coloured black with the red British cross near the corner; the album version is the CD and DVD format, with the CD and DVD cover imprinted onto the mug, red tea tin, and the bag. The digital release uses the standalone CD format. The booklet and photo shoot were designed by Chow, and the design was based on Hamasaki's first visit to the UK. First pressing issues for both the standalone CD format, the CD and DVD format, and the box set included a 36–page photo album of Hamasaki roaming the streets and wandering around stores and markets in London.

== Promotion ==
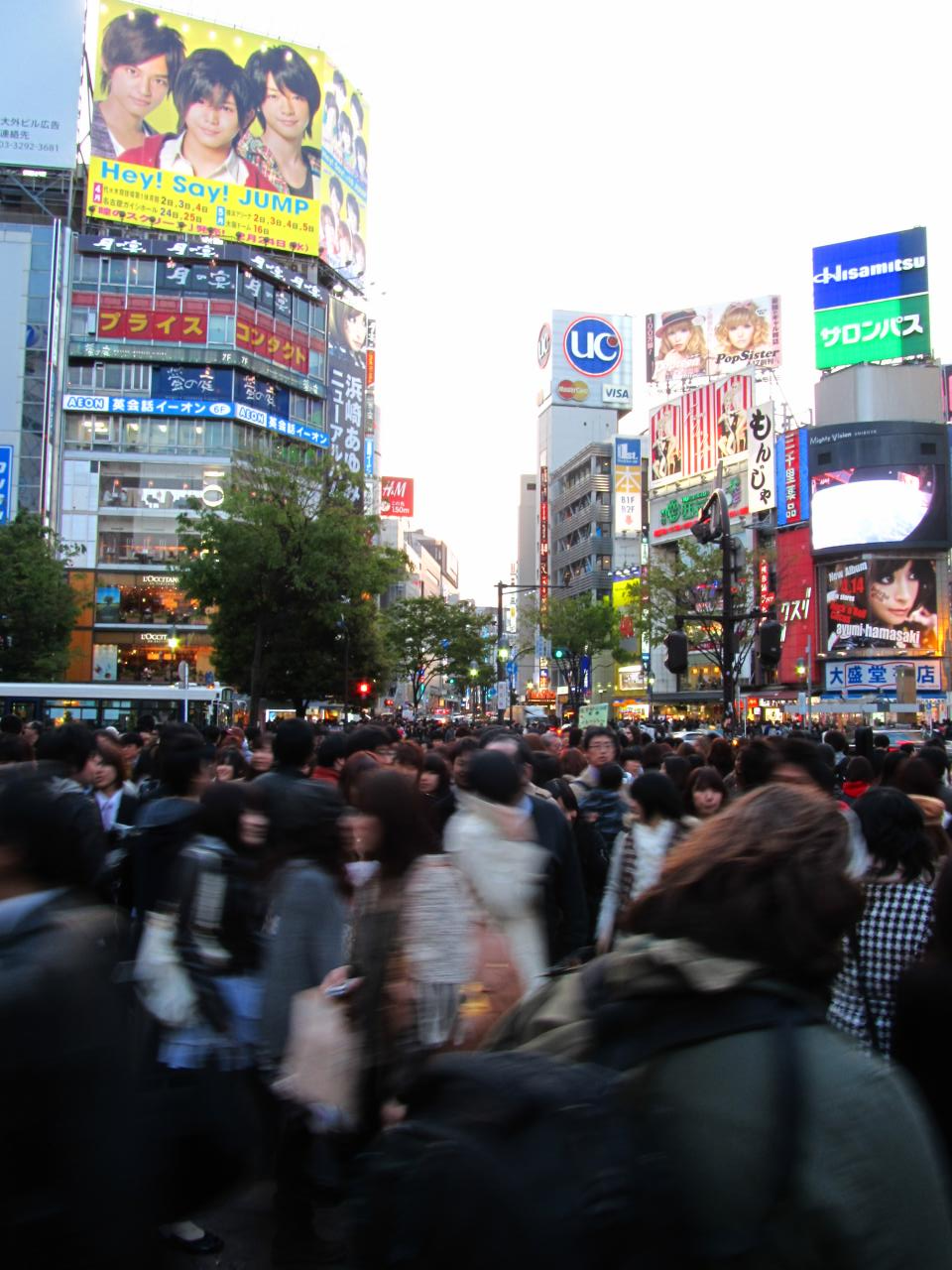
Rock 'n' Roll Circus being promoted on a billboard at Shibuya Crossing.

In order to promote Rock 'n' Roll Circus, Hamasaki conducted several commercial endorsement opportunities and expanded several other ventures. Hamasaki opened two special websites to document her preparation for the Rock 'n' Roll Circus concert tour, and additional promotional activity. On the day of the album's release, Hamasaki was interviewed by Yahoo! Music Japan and Myspace to talk about the album's material and further promotional activity. Hamasaki also received exclusive deals to promote Rock 'n' Roll Circus through mobile phones, including the Japanese services SNS and Utapiku. One day after the album's domestic release, Hamasaki began expanding her online presence by setting up accounts on MySpace, Ustream, and Twitter to promote the album and interact with her fan base. Hamasaki renewed her contract with British cosmetics line Rimmel as an ode to her image from the album; she was part of several campaigns through 2010.

=== Concert tours and other releases ===
Hamasaki conducted several live performances to promote the material from Rock 'n' Roll Circus. Hamasaki performed both "Sunrise" and "Sunset" on the annual 2009 A-Nation concert tour in Japan; she performed on August 1 and 8. Hamasaki performed "You Were..." on Japan's Music Station television network on December 9, 2009. Hamasaki appeared again at the annual 2010 A-nation concert tour in Japan on February 29, 2010, only; she performed "Microphone", the only song selected from the Rock 'n' Roll Circus album. Her performance of "Microphone" received positive reviews from most music critics. "Sunrise (Love Is All)" and its accompanying music video was released on Avex Trax's A-Nation '10 Various Artists compilation album.

Hamasaki went on her 2010 Rock 'n' Roll Circus Tour. Hamasaki announced the concert in February 2010, with several concert tours in Japan confirmed. Merchandise from the tour stands were available exclusively through Mu-mo stores in Japan before the tour commenced. The concert tour was recorded at Yoyogi National Gymnasium in Tokyo, and the recurring theme was circus-based. Album tracks apart from "Sunset", "Last Links", Montage", "Sunrise", "Meaning of Love", and "Red Line (For TA)" were included on the set list for the tour. Pushed back from March 20 due to the 2011 Tōhoku earthquake and tsunami, the concert tour was released on April 20, 2011, in two formats; a triple-DVD bundle, and a Blu-ray release. Despite not being included on Rock 'n' Roll Circus, "Moon" and "Virgin Road" from the 2010 Rock 'n' Roll Circus Tour were included on her following live DVD compilation A 50 Singles: Live Selection (2011).

The DVD reached number one on the Oricon DVD Chart, with over 38,319 in its first week. At the time of its charting week on April 27, 2011, both Rock'n'Roll Circus Tour Final: 7days Special and A 50 Singles: Live Selection occupied the top and second position on the Oricon DVD Chart; this was the first time a female artist accomplished this feat. By the end of 2011, the live DVD sold over 54,180 units in Japan. In May 2011, the live DVD releases prompted Oricon Style to declare Hamasaki the highest selling female artist based on DVD sales; it tallied to over 2.3 million units in Japan. To promote the material from Rock 'n' Roll Circus, tracks were remixed and produced for Hamasaki's Ayu-Mi-x remix album series; "You Were..." was re-arranged by CMJK for the orchestral compilation Ayu-mi-x 7 Version Acoustic Orchestra, while "Sunrise" was remixed by Accatino, Rimonti, and Festari for the eurodance compilation Ayu-mi-x 7 Presents Ayu-ro Mix 4 (2011).

=== Singles ===
"Sunrise" and "Sunset (Love Is All)" were released as the album's lead a-side single on August 12, 2009. "Sunrise" was used as the theme song for NTT Communications commercial song and TV Ashai's program Dandy Daddy, while "Sunset" was used as the theme song for Music.JP and Panasonic Lumix cameras. The songs received positive reviews from music critics, who praised the composition and production. It also achieved success in her native Japan, peaking at number one on the Japanese Oricon Singles Chart, while "Sunrise" peaked at 10 on the Billboard Japan Hot 100 chart. The physical format was certified gold by RIAJ for shipments of 100,000 units; "Sunrise" was certified double platinum and platinum for digital and ringtone downloads, shifting over 750,000 units in Japan. The accompanying music videos for both singles were shot at a sightseeing tower in Chiba Prefecture; it features Hamasaki and back-up dancers performing the song in front of an audience. The "Sunrise" video was shot during the day, while "Sunset" was shot during the evening.

"You Were..." and "Ballad" were released as the album's second and final a-side single on December 29, 2009. "You Were..." was used as the theme song for Music.JP and the theme song for the Japanese subtitled Walt Disney film, Tinker Bell and the Lost Treasure, while the second song "Ballad" is tied up with The Firmament of the Pleiades, a NHK's historical and political drama based on Jirō Asada's book of the same name. Both songs received positive reviews from most music critics, praising the song writing, composition, and Hamasaki's vocals. It achieved success in Japan, debuting atop the Japanese Oricon Singles Chart, while "You Were..." peaked at 14 and 4 on the Billboard Japan Hot 100 and Hot Singles Sales chart. The physical format was certified gold by RIAJ for shipments of 100,000 units; "You Were..." was certified double platinum and platinum for digital and ringtone downloads, shifting over 750,000 units in Japan. Accompanying music videos were shot for the singles; The "You Were..." video features Hamasaki in a winter field, while "Ballad" features Hamasaki in heaven watching over her lover.

=== Other charted songs ===
"Microphone", the album's lead promotional single, was released on March 26, 2010. The song charted at 33 on Billboard's Japan Hot 100 and 10 on the RIAJ Digital Track Chart. The accompanying music video was shot in London. The music video continues from the "Sexy Little Things" video; it features Hamasaki in a grand hall, and in different parts of London. After the album's release, "Don't Look Back", "Sexy Little Things", "Lady Dynamite", "Count Down", "Meaning of Love", and "Last Links" charted at: 20, 52, 66, 67, 49, and 50 on the RIAJ Digital Track Chart respectively. "Don't Look Back", "Sexy Little Things", and "Lady Dynamite" received music videos each. The video to "Don't Look Back" features Hamasaki at a dining table, with one half of her face done with make-up and the other side smudged with make-up; Hamasaki also poses in front of a ragged portrait of her album cover, A Best 2: Black. The video to "Sexy Little Thing" features Hamasaki inside a black and white room, dancing with Englishmen while wearing circus clothing; the ending scene includes the starting scene for the video "Microphone". The video to "Lady Dynamite" has Hamasaki partying in a gay club with drag queens.

== Critical reception ==
Professional ratings
Review scores
Source	Rating
AllMusic	2/5 stars

Rock 'n' Roll Circus received mixed to favorable reviews from most music critics. A staff reviewer from CD Journal praised the album's rock influences, and commended the album's production. Greg from Selective Hearing was positive towards the album. He commented, "This was an excellent album and I couldn’t think of a single thing that could be wrong. It proves that Ayu is still at the top of her game." However, he felt that "Last Links", "Lady Dynamite", "Sexy Little Things", "The Meaning Of Love", and "Red Line -for TA-" were the album's, "standard cookie cutter fillers".

In a mixed review, Alexey Eremenko from AllMusic awarded the album two stars out of five. Eremenko was positive towards the album's "meticulously arranged music, and multiple stylistic layers ensure that the record does not wear thin after the first few listens". However, he furthered stated, "but although Rock'n'Roll Circus is a testament to veritable professional skills of Hamasaki and her producers and songwriters, its emotional power is questionable, to put it mildly." Although criticizing the album's addition of J-pop music, its additional "clichés", and labelling the ballads as the "worst offenders on the album", he concluded, "This is Hamasaki's eleventh album, and so song writing routine is to be expected, to a degree, but she would have been better off going all the way with the alt-rock gimmick instead of meekly complying with the already trite conventions of J-pop, even if she had created those herself." Tetsuo Hiraga from Hot Express was mixed in his review. Although he commended Hamasaki's transition to rock music and her song writing, he said he became "worried" about the production and found it regressive in comparison to Next Level.

At the annual 2010 J-Station Music Awards, Rock 'n' Roll Circus won Best Pop album, Hamasaki won Best Female Artist, and "Microphone" won Best Music Video. Phil Freeman from the online blog and magazine publication The Wire short listed Rock 'n' Roll Circus as one of the best albums of 2010.

== Commercial performances ==
According to Oricon, Avex Trax had expected to ship approximately 400,000 total units in its first week of sales; as a result, the sales mark were printed and distributed for several stores throughout Japan. Rock 'n' Roll Circus debuted at number one on the Japanese Daily Oricon Albums Chart, staying there for an entire week. This resulted in the album debuting atop the Japanese Weekly Oricon Albums Chart, with an estimated 205,000 sold units in its first week of sales. (Note: Sales provided by Oricon database and are rounded to the nearest thousand copies.) This became the highest selling album by a female artist for first week sales of 2010. Rock 'n' Roll Circus became Hamasaki's tenth studio album to debut atop the Oricon Albums Chart for both Daily and Weekly rankings, making Hamasaki the first artist to have at least one album at the top of the charts for 12 consecutive years. Hamasaki also became the only female artist to have the most number one albums on Oricon since her debut with eleven entries, apart from Guilty which reached number two. It slipped to number three the following week, shifting 45,686 in Japan. It stayed in the top 10 for five weeks, and the top 300 with 23 weeks overall.

Rock 'n' Roll Circus entered the Billboard Top Albums Sales Chart at the top spot, her fourth album to do so. It slipped to number three in its second charting week, and stayed in the top ten for five weeks. It lasted 14 weeks in the top 100 chart, with a final charting position at 73. Rock 'n' Roll Circus also reached number 73 on the South Korean Gaon Album Chart, and the top spot on the Taiwanese East Asian Albums Chart.

Rock 'n' Roll Circus was certified Platinum in April 2010 by the Recording Industry Association of Japan (RIAJ) for shipments of 250,000 units. This is Hamasaki's final album to shift over 300,000 physical units, and was her first studio album not to receive a double platinum certification since Next Level. At the end of 2010 Rock 'n' Roll Circus sold 318,454 units in Japan; this ranked the seventh best-selling album by a female artist, just behind entries from Japanese singers Kana Nishino, Namie Amuro, Kaela Kimura, Kumi Koda, and Hikaru Utada, and American singer Lady Gaga. By March 2011, Avex Trax confirmed that Rock 'n' Roll Circus has sold over 380,000 units in Japan. Avex Finance Holdings Inc. released an online press statement, showing that Rock 'n' Roll Circus was recognized as a reason for their increase of sales and revenue for the first quarter of 2010.

== Track listing ==
All lyrics are written by Ayumi Hamasaki.

CD (CD, CD+DVD, special limited box set)
No.	Title	Music	Arranger(s)	Length
1.	"The Introduction"	CMJK	CMJK	1:39
2.	"Microphone"	Yuta Nakano	Yuta Nakano	4:23
3.	"Count Down"	Tetsuya Yukumi	CMJK	4:34
4.	"Sunset (Love Is All)"	Hana Nishimura	Yuta Nakano	5:46
5.	"Ballad"	D.A.I	Yuta Nakano	5:20
6.	"Last Links"	Tetsuya Yukumi	CMJK	3:56
7.	"Montage"	Yuta Nakano	Yuta Nakano	1:40
8.	"Don't Look Back"	Yuta Nakano	CMJK	4:07
9.	"Jump!"	CMJK	CMJK	1:36
10.	"Lady Dynamite"	Kazuhiro Hara	CMJK	4:17
11.	"Sexy Little Things"	Yuta Nakano	Yuta Nakano	3:58
12.	"Sunrise (Love Is All)"	Hana Nishimura	CMJK	4:46
13.	"Meaning of Love"	Tetsuya Yukumi	HIKARI	5:20
14.	"You Were..."	Kazuhiro Hara	HΛL	4:48
15.	"Red Line (for TA)" (Album Version)	Tetsuya Yukumi	Yuta Nakano	5:46

CD Bonus track
No.	Title	Length
16.	"Moon" (Available for TeamAyu members)	5:47

DVD 1 (CD+DVD, special limited box set)
No.	Title	Director(s)	Length
1.	"Sunrise: Love is All" (video clip)	Wataru Takeishi	4:51
2.	"Sunset: Love is All" (video clip)	Wataru Takeishi	5:44
3.	"You Were..." (video clip)	Masashi Muto	5:11
4.	"Ballad" (video clip)	Takahide Ishii	5:48
5.	"Sexy Little Things" (video clip)	Masashi Muto	4:23
6.	"Microphone" (video clip)	Masashi Muto	4:27
7.	"Don't Look Back" (video clip)	Hideaki Sunaga	4:10
8.	"Lady Dynamite" (video clip)	Kazuyoshi Shimomura	4:17
9.	"Sunrise: Love is All" (making clip)	Keisuke Onodera, Jin Koyanagi	4:43
10.	"Sunset: Love is All" (making clip)	Keisuke Onodera, Jin Koyanagi	3:07
11.	"You Were..." (making clip)	Keisuke Onodera, Jin Koyanagi	3:03
12.	"Ballad" (making clip)	Keisuke Onodera, Jin Koyanagi	3:13
13.	"Sexy Little Things" (making clip)	Keisuke Onodera, Jin Koyanagi	2:56
14.	"Microphone" (making clip)	Keisuke Onodera, Jin Koyanagi	2:57
15.	"Don't Look Back" (making clip)	Keisuke Onodera, Jin Koyanagi	3:03
16.	"Lady Dynamite" (making clip)	Keisuke Onodera, Jin Koyanagi	3:08
17.	""Ayumi Hamasaki Arena Tour 2009: Next Level" Digest" (bonus track)		5:36

DVD 2: Ayumi Hamasaki Arena Tour 2009: Next Level (special limited box set)
No.	Title	Length
1.	"Pieces of Seven"
2.	"Rule"
3.	"Unite!"
4.	"Disco-munication"
5.	"Energize"
6.	"Sunrise: Love is All"
7.	"Load of the Shugyo"
8.	"Love ‘n’ Hate"
9.	"Identity"
10.	"In the Corner"
11.	"Hope or Pain"
12.	"Green"
13.	"Days"
14.	"Evolution"
15.	"Signal"
16.	"Rollin’"
17.	"Sparkle"
18.	"Bridge to the Sky"
19.	"Next Level"

DVD 3: Ayumi Hamasaki Arena Tour 2009: Next Level (special limited box set)
No.	Title	Length
20.	"Curtain Call"
21.	"Sunset: Love is All"
22.	"Everywhere Nowhere"
23.	"Humming 7/4"
24.	"Boys & Girls"
25.	"My All"

=== All formats ===
- Standard CD – Consists of fifteen original tracks on one disc.
- First pressing standard CD – Consists of fifteen original tracks on one disc. First press issues include bonus poster and an obi strip.
- CD and DVD – Consists of fifteen original tracks on one disc. Consists of eight music videos, eight behind the scenes videos, and one live performance on a second disc.
- First pressing CD and DVD – Consists of fifteen original tracks on one disc. Consists of eight music videos, eight behind the scenes videos, and one live performance on a second disc. First press issues include bonus poster and an obi strip.
- Special Limited Edition box set – Consists of fifteen original tracks on one disc. Consists of eight music videos, eight behind the scenes videos, and one live performance on a second disc. Box set includes a tea mug, a tin containing red tea, and a bag. Box set includes the live DVD to Ayumi Hamasaki Arena Tour 2009 A: Next Level, and includes the photo album with CD. All items housed inside a black box with British symbols.

== Personnel ==
Credits adapted from the liner notes of Rock 'n' Roll Circus.

- Ayumi Hamasaki – lead vocals, background vocals, song writing
- Max Matsuura – producer
- CMJK – composer, arranger, mixing
- Yuta Nakano – composer, arranger
- Tetsuya Yukumi – composer
- Dai Nagao – composer
- Kazuhiro Hara – composer
- Hana Nishimura – composer
- Hal – arranger
- Hikari – arranger
- Jake Morley – bass guitar
- Fraser McColl – guitar
- Harry McColl – drums
- Kiku – guitar
- The London String Machine – string arrangements
- Chiharu Mikizuki – bass guitar
- Tom Tada – drums
- Ryota Akizuki – guitar
- Junko Hirotani – backing vocals
- Yuko Kajitani Strings – string arrangements
- Magnus Mehta – tabla, percussion
- James Pusey – sitar
- Kenji Suzuki – guitar
- A Boys – audience cheering
- Harvey Brough – string arrangements
- Gen Ittetsu – string arrangements
- Mayuko Maruyama – programmer
- Hidetomo Yoneda – A&R
- Takuma Noriage – art director
- Kouhei Hatakeyama – engineer
- Liam Nolan – engineer
- Seiji Itabashi – engineer
- Tim Young – mastered by
- Kōji Morimoto – mixing, recorded by
- Yuichi Nagayama – mixing, recorded by
- Yuta Nakano – mixing
- ND Chow – photography
- Taro Washio – assistant photography
- Dom Morley – recorded by
- Masashi Hashimoto – recorded by
- Phill Brown – recorded by
- Avex Trax – Hamasaki's record label
- Avex Entertainment Inc. – Hamasaki's distribution label

== Charts ==
=== Weekly charts ===
Chart (2010)	Peak position
Japanese Albums (Oricon)	1
Japanese Top Albums (Billboard)	1
South Korean Albums (Gaon)	73
Taiwanese East Asian Albums (G-Music)	1

=== Year-end charts ===
Chart (2010)	Position
Japanese Albums (Oricon)	21

== Certifications ==
Region	Certification	Certified units/sales
Japan (RIAJ)	Platinum	345,000

== Release history ==
Region	Date	Format	Label
Japan	April 14, 2010	CD	Avex Trax
Japan	April 14, 2010	Double CD & DVD	Avex Trax
Japan	April 14, 2010	Special limited box set	Avex Trax
Japan	April 14, 2010	Digital album	Avex Entertainment Inc.
Australia	April 14, 2010	Digital album	Avex Entertainment Inc.
New Zealand	April 14, 2010	Digital album	Avex Entertainment Inc.
United Kingdom	April 14, 2010	Digital album	Avex Entertainment Inc.
Germany	April 14, 2010	Digital album	Avex Entertainment Inc.
Ireland	April 14, 2010	Digital album	Avex Entertainment Inc.
France	April 14, 2010	Digital album	Avex Entertainment Inc.
Spain	April 14, 2010	Digital album	Avex Entertainment Inc.
Taiwan	April 14, 2010	Digital album	Avex Entertainment Inc.

== See also ==
- List of Oricon number-one albums of 2010
