= Premium Showcase: Feel the Love =

Ayumi Hamasaki Premium Showcase: Feel the Love

Video by Ayumi Hamasaki
- Released: October 22, 2014
- Recorded: July 6, 2014
- Venue: Yoyogi National Gymnasium
- Genre: J-pop
- Label: Avex

Ayumi Hamasaki chronology
Ayumi Hamasaki Countdown Live 2013-2014 A (2014)	Ayumi Hamasaki Premium Showcase: Feel the Love (2014)	Ayumi Hamasaki Countdown Live 2014–2015 A: Cirque de Minuit (2015)

Ayumi Hamasaki Premium Showcase: Feel the Love is Japanese pop singer Ayumi Hamasaki's 38th DVD/Blu-ray release. It was released on October 22, 2014. The tour was promoted as a "premium live", visiting only 3 cities – Nagoya, Osaka and Tokyo – with 11 shows in Japan from late May to early July. The tour started on May 30, 2014 at Nippon Gaishi Hall and finished with four final shows at Yoyogi National Gymnasium on July 3, 4, 5 and 6, 2014.

The DVD peaked at No. 3 on the weekly Oricon DVD Chart, while the Blu-ray reached No. 11.

== Release ==
The concert was released in two formats: a standard DVD version and the Blu-ray version. It includes first-time performances of songs from her 15th studio album Colours.

== Track list ==
Track list taken from Avex.

1. "Whatever"
2. "Last angel"
3. "Magical Night"
4. "Decision"
5. "Never Ever"
6. "Because of You"
7. "What is Forever Love"
8. "Starry Night"
9. "To Be"
10. "Hello New Me"
11. "circus"
12. "Adagio for A"
13. "Angel"
14. "DJ Time"
15. "Terminal"
16. "Connected"
17. "Step You"
18. "Xoxo"
19. "Jump!"
20. "Lelio"
21. "You & Me"
22. "Bold & Delicious"
23. "Now & 4Eva"
24. "Boys & Girls"
25. "July 1st"
26. "Feel the Love"

== Charts ==
Release	Chart	Peak position
October 22, 2014	Oricon DVD Chart (General)	3
October 22, 2014	Oricon Blu-ray Chart (General)	11
