= Merry-Go-Round (Ayumi Hamasaki song) =

2013 single by Ayumi Hamasaki

- Cover artwork used to commercialize physical editions of the single.

Single by Ayumi Hamasaki

from the album Colours
- A-side: "Feel the Love"
- Released: December 25, 2013
- Recorded: 2013
- Genre: Electronic dance
- Length: 5:09
- Label: Avex Trax; Avex Taiwan
- Songwriter: Ayumi Hamasaki
- Producers: Max Matsuura; M-Flo

Ayumi Hamasaki singles chronology
"How Beautiful You Are" (2012)	"Feel the Love" / "Merry-Go-Round" (2013)	"Hello New Me" (2014)

Music video
- "Merry-Go-Round" on YouTube

"Merry-Go-Round" is a song recorded by Japanese recording artist Ayumi Hamasaki, featuring a rap section delivered by Japanese artist Verbal, for the singer's fifteenth studio album Colours (2014). It was released worldwide in six different formats on December 25, 2013 by Avex Trax, Avex Taiwan, and Avex Entertainment Inc. It was also Hamasaki's first physical release in three years since her EP–single L (2010), and her first double A-side single, alongside the track "Feel the Love", since "Moon" and "Blossom" that same year. The track was written by Hamasaki, whilst production was handled by Japanese musician and long-time collaborator Max Matsuura with the assistance of M-Flo; this marks Hamasaki's first single to be produced with another producer outside of Matsuura. Musically, "Merry-Go-Round" is an electronic dance song that includes guitars and synthesizers in its instrumentation.

Upon its release, "Merry-Go-Round" received favorable reviews from music critics. The majority of them praised the composition, production, and Hamasaki's vocal performance, whilst others also highlighted the track as one of the best entries on Colours. Charting together with "Feel the Love", it underperformed in Japan, reaching number five on the Oricon Singles Chart, and was her first single to miss the top spot since her single "Daybreak" twelve years earlier. Two accompanying music videos were shot by Luis Hernandez and Satoru Yokoyama, which featured Hamasaki in Los Angeles, California at the top of a skyscraper, and her with another man; the Yokoyama version also included an appearance with Verbal. To promote the single, Hamasaki performed the track on her 2013–2014 Countdown live tour.

== Background and composition ==
On October 24, 2013, it was confirmed through Japanese publication Natalie that Hamasaki would release a double A-side single titled "Feel the Love"/"Merry-Go-Round", and would serve as the singer's first physical release in three years since her EP–single L (2010). It was also her first double A-side single, alongside the track "Feel the Love", since "Moon" and "Blossom" that same year. The recording was written by Hamasaki, whilst production was handled by Japanese musician and long-time collaborator Max Matsuura with the assistance of Japanese group M-Flo; this marks Hamasaki's first single to be produced with another producer instead of a sole production by Matsuura. Musically, "Merry-Go-Round" is an electronic dance song. It was composed by Japanese musicians Jeb, Unico, alongside M-Flo, and featured backing vocals by Japanese vocalist Yuta Nakano; it also features synthesizers, acoustic and electric guitars, and keyboards in its instrumentation. "Merry-Go-Round" was one of the only tracks on Hamasaki's fifteenth studio album Colours to have been recorded in Japanese language, containing minor phrases in English.

== Release ==
"Feel the Love"/"Merry-Go-Round" was released in six different formats on December 25, 2013 by Avex Trax, Avex Taiwan, and Avex Entertainment Inc. worldwide, and served as the lead single and double A-side release from her album Colours. The CD release featured the two original recordings and the original instrumental versions, plus a remix for "Feel the Love" by DJ Hello Kitty and Blasterjaxx. The CD and DVD format incorporated the same track list, but also included the video clips to "Feel the Love" and "Merry-Go-Round". A limited edition CD and DVD format was distributed through Hamasaki's fan club website TeamAyu, and included the same track list on both discs alongside a bonus interview with Hamasaki on the latter DVD disc. The digital EP incorporates the same tracks. To promote the single's release date on Christmas Day and during Hamasaki's Countdown live tour for New Year's Day in 2014, Avex Trax distributed three music cards featuring the same content; the first was a promotional shot from the single's photoshoot, whilst the latter two celebrated Christmas and New Years with her signature AyuPan character design.

== Reception ==
Upon its release, "Merry-Go-Round" received favorable reviews from music critics. A staff member of Japanese music magazine CD Journal complimented M-Flo's contribution towards the single, and praised the overall production of the track. Alongside this, a separate review for her album Colours selected it as one of the best tracks. Dato from KKbox.com was generally positive towards the composition by Tetsuya Komuro, but criticized the generic and "brainwashing" production for portraying an electronic sound. However, he selected it as one of his recommended tracks from the album. Similarly, a member from Mojim.com praised the "charming" and "dance floor"-inspired production and commended its overall composition; the review also complimented Verbal's vocal performance.

Charting together with "Feel the Love", the track underperformed in Japan. It debuted at number five on the Oricon Singles Chart, selling 30,385 units in its first week. It became her first single to miss the top spot since her recording "Daybreak" twelve years earlier, and one of her lowest first-week sales in her career. It fell to number 16 the following week, selling 4,704 units, and eventually lasted for six weeks on the chart. By the end of 2014, it sold 37,366 units. Both singles reached number seven on the Billboard Hot Singles Sales chart in Japan, and stayed there for three weeks.

== Promotion ==
Two music videos were shot for the single by Luis Hernandez and Satoru Yokoyama, respectively. Hernandez's version opens with busy streets and the dawn of Los Angeles, California. Hamasaki begins singing the song on top of a skyscraper, whilst several intercut scenes of people walking around Los Angeles during a time lapse are shown. She is then seen painting a picture of an unidentified man, who raps Verbal's part. It then shows intercut scenes of traffic, a carousel and couple standing near a bridge. Several parts of these scenes are revised throughout the entire video, which ends with Hamasaki again on top of the skyscraper. For Yokoyama's video, only shots featuring Verbal were only filmed, alongside scenes of him walking through a city in Japan, and residing in a neon-lit club. Parts of Hernandez's version, with the scenes of Hamasaki painting a man and scenes of Los Angeles city and public, were removed in order to merge the first video and Verbal's appearance together. This version premiered one week before the album's release on July 2, and was included on the DVD and Blu-Ray versions of Colours.

To promote the single, Hamasaki performed the track on her 2013–2014 A Countdown Live show at the Yoyogi National Gymnasium in Yoyogi Park, Tokyo. It was included on the track list for the live DVD, released on April 30, 2014. On June 18, 2014, weeks prior to the release of Colours, Hamasaki released a non-stop megamix album entitled EDMA, which included the track and other songs from Colours.

== Track list and formats ==
- CD single
1. "Feel the Love" (Original mix) – 5:22
2. "Merry-Go-Round" (Original mix) – 5:09
3. "Feel the Love" (DJ Hello Kitty Remix) – 5:25
4. "Feel the Love" (Blasterjaxx Remix) – 5:30
5. "Feel the Love" (Original mix) [Instrumental] – 5:22
6. "Merry-Go-Round" (Original mix) [Instrumental] – 5:09
- CD and DVD single
1. "Feel the Love" (Original mix) – 5:22
2. "Merry-Go-Round" (Original mix) – 5:09
3. "Feel the Love" (DJ Hello Kitty Remix) – 5:25
4. "Feel the Love" (Blasterjaxx Remix) – 5:30
5. "Feel the Love" (Original mix) [Instrumental] – 5:22
6. "Merry-Go-Round" (Original mix) [Instrumental] – 5:09
7. "Feel the Love" (Music video)
8. "Merry-Go-Round" (Music video)
- Music Cards
1. "Feel the Love" (Original mix) – 5:22
2. "Merry-Go-Round" (Original mix) – 5:09
3. "Feel the Love" (DJ Hello Kitty Remix) – 5:25
4. "Feel the Love" (Blasterjaxx Remix) – 5:30
5. "Feel the Love" (Original mix) [Instrumental] – 5:22
6. "Merry-Go-Round" (Original mix) [Instrumental] – 5:09
- Digital EP
1. "Feel the Love" (Original mix) – 5:22
2. "Merry-Go-Round" (Original mix) – 5:09
3. "Feel the Love" (DJ Hello Kitty Remix) – 5:25
4. "Feel the Love" (Blasterjaxx Remix) – 5:30
5. "Feel the Love" (Original mix) [Instrumental] – 5:22
6. "Merry-Go-Round" (Original mix) [Instrumental] – 5:09
- US digital single
1. "Feel the Love" (Original mix) – 5:22
2. "Merry-Go-Round" (Original mix) – 5:09

== Credits and personnel ==
Credits adapted from the CD liner notes of "Feel the Love"/"Merry-Go-Round".

Recording and management

- Recorded and mixed at Record Plant Studios, Los Angeles, California in 2013. Management by Avex Trax.

Credits

- Ayumi Hamasaki – vocals, songwriting, backing vocals
- Yuta Nakano – backing vocals
- Mitsunori Ikeda – arrangement, programming
- Tachytelic – arrangement, programming
- Jaycen Joshua – mixing
- Jeb – composition
- Unico – composition
- M-Flo – composition, production
- Verbal – rapping, songwriting
- Gori Kumamoto – photography
- Max Matsuura – production
- Luis Hernandez – music video director
- Satoru Yokoyama – music video director

== Charts and sales ==
=== Weekly charts ===
Chart (2013–2014)	Peak position
Japan Hot Single Sales Chart (Billboard)	7
Japan Weekly Chart (Oricon)	5

=== Sales ===
Region	Certification	Certified units/sales
Japan (RIAJ)	—	37,366

== Release history ==
Region	Date	Format	Label
Japan	December 25, 2013	CD	Avex Trax
Japan	December 25, 2013	CD and DVD	Avex Trax
Japan	December 25, 2013	Digital download	Avex Trax
Japan	December 25, 2013	Music cards (3x)	Avex Trax
Taiwan	December 25, 2013	CD	Avex Taiwan
Taiwan	December 25, 2013	CD and DVD	Avex Taiwan
Taiwan	December 25, 2013	Digital download	Avex Taiwan
Japan	December 25, 2013	Digital download	Avex Entertainment Inc.
Australia	December 25, 2013	Digital download	Avex Entertainment Inc.
New Zealand	December 25, 2013	Digital download	Avex Entertainment Inc.
United Kingdom	December 25, 2013	Digital download	Avex Entertainment Inc.
Ireland	December 25, 2013	Digital download	Avex Entertainment Inc.
Germany	December 25, 2013	Digital download	Avex Entertainment Inc.
Spain	December 25, 2013	Digital download	Avex Entertainment Inc.
France	December 25, 2013	Digital download	Avex Entertainment Inc.
Italy	December 25, 2013	Digital download	Avex Entertainment Inc.
United States	December 25, 2013	Digital download	Avex Entertainment Inc.
Canada	December 25, 2013	Digital download	Avex Entertainment Inc.
