= Love Songs (Ayumi Hamasaki album) =

Studio album by Ayumi Hamasaki
- Released: December 22, 2010
- Recorded: 2010
- Genres: Pop; pop rock; dance
- Length: 67:29
- Label: Avex Trax
- Producer: Max Matsuura

Ayumi Hamasaki chronology
Rock 'n' Roll Circus (2010)	Love Songs (2010)	Five (2011)

Singles from Love Songs
- 1. "Moon/Blossom" Released: July 14, 2010; 2. "Crossroad" Released: September 22, 2010; 3. "L: Virgin Road, Sweet Season, Last Angel" Released: September 29, 2010

Professional ratings
Review scores
Source	Rating
AllMusic	2.5/5 stars

Love Songs (stylized as Love songs) is the twelfth studio album by Japanese singer-songwriter Ayumi Hamasaki. The album was released on December 22, 2010, through Avex Trax, eight months after her eleventh studio album Rock 'n' Roll Circus. A stylistic return to the aesthetic of her albums before Secret, Love Songs contains pop songs with lyrics primarily revolving around love, many of them ballads.

The album was promoted with three singles. These singles were a countdown to her fiftieth single. Lead single "Moon"/"Blossom" was released on July 14, 2010. Its performance was disappointing: despite it reaching number one, the single sold just over 95,000 copies and failed to be certified. "Crossroad" saw similar performance. Though it was certified gold by the Recording Industry Association of Japan, it sold just over 99,000 copies. The third single was Hamasaki's fiftieth single, titled "L", the Roman numeral for fifty. A triple-A-side consisting of the songs "Last Angel", "Virgin Road", and "Sweet Season", L reached number one on the Oricon charts, becoming her thirty-eighth single to top the charts in Japan. However, it sold under 95,000 copies. The album's release was coincided with the release of Naoya Urata's debut single "Dream On", produced by Hamasaki, becoming her first production credit for another artist. The song snippets were made available for streaming on Hamasaki's official website.

Love Songs was moderately successful in Japan, where it debuted atop the Oricon with first-week sales of over 180,000 copies. This tallied Hamasaki's lowest first-week sales for an album at that point. Having sold over 270,000 copies, the album has been certified platinum by the Recording Industry Association of Japan. The leading radio single, "Love Song," has also been certified as a gold single by the RIAJ, for digital downloads to cellphones.

== Music videos ==
A 2:56 minute clip for Moon was released on June 9, 2010, in Ayumi Hamasaki's YouTube channel. The full PV was released on July 13, 2010, a day before the single was available in stores. The video featured Ayumi singing in a European aristocratic room setting. As the video progresses a strange, black, tar-like liquid begins dropping in the room, on random furniture. The video is also inter-cut with scenes of Ayumi smiling while holding one of her pet dogs, in her second verse it shown ayumi with the black liquid falling down all over her face, near chest and going to her hands. Depicting sorrow or despair, presumably of the dog shown towards the end of the video. On YouTube, the music video of Moon now has approximately 1,400,000 views. The full music video runtime of moon is 05:50. The music video of Moon was directed by Masashi Muto.

The music video of Blossom was initially cancelled, but later appear on the single "Crossroad." It was released September 4, 2010 and filmed on the first days of August. Also the music video was promoted in magazines. Ayumi does not appear in the video, but it features Hero Jaejoong (member of TVXQ, now of JYJ since TVXQ's three member split). The MV's plot starts out with Hero having enjoying his time with his girlfriend at the beach, etc. However, in the middle of the video, Hero visits to a doctor, and finds out that he is diagnosed with terminal cancer (3rd stage) and has only two weeks left to survive. Later, Hero goes to meet his girlfriend to celebrate the birthday. Then, Hero kills himself when he makes the chair and a glass bottle smash on him, the ending scene shows Hero's girlfriend looking at a painting of them both, what Hero was trying to paint in the beginning of the MV. There is a director's cut of the MV as well. The running time of "Blossom" is 6:53. This music video was not uploaded to Ayumi Hamasaki's YouTube account.

A teaser was released for Crossroad on the September 9, 2010 and the full music video was released September 10, 2010. A Behind-the-Scenes version was released on September 21, 2010; personnel included Masashi Muto (Director, PV), Shogen Yamamoto (Lighting Designer), and Takayuki Taketa (Director, CGI). It begins with Ayumi in a dark room, in a big red dress. Near the end of the video, she burns herself and the sofa with a match, smiling. Also, the room is full of TVs, with Ayumi in a circled, dark blue room.

The videos for Sweet Season and Virgin Road premiered September 27, 2010. The music video for Sweet Season starts with Ayumi picking up her kids with her car, and driving back home. It shows her and her kids having fun at the swimming pool outside their house in a 1960s Americana style with a modern twist. Near the end of the video, Ayumi falls in the swimming pool slowly, with flashbacks of her and her kids. Then, she wakes up post partying and hungover (which is heavily implied with various bottles of alcohol are scattered all around her and she's very disheveled in a sequin jacket and jeans, messy hair and smeared eye makeup) at the same place on her backyard sofa, realizing that it was only a dream. She is dressed differently from before, changing from a sweet-looking mother and housewife into a rocker party girl looking woman, with heavy smeared makeup. The second version of the video features new scenes of Hamasaki and her children in the living room singing, and scenes could be seen rewound. This version was not part of her Love Songs's music videos, but seems to have been leaked from a parent of one of the children in the music video.

The music video for Virgin Road features Austrian actor and model Manuel Schwarz (later to become Hamasaki's real-life husband). Virgin Road was Hamasaki's fifth-most expensive music video, behind Jewel, Green, Fairyland and My Name's Women. The video's production reportedly cost $1,000,000. The music video was shot in Los Angeles and features Hamasaki and Schwarz getting married. After that, they are seen robbing a bank and gas station. The video was Hamasaki's first encounter with large guns. A police chase ensues, and Hamasaki throws the stolen money out of the car. Resting somewhere on the hill, helicopter throw grenades at the couple, but they escape. The PVs for Love Song, Last Angel, Virgin Road, Sweet Season and Do It Again were all filmed in California (mainly in Los Angeles), in the United States starting from November 19, 2010.

== Promotion ==
Hamasaki promoted "Love Songs" with advertisements around Japan, and by performing many of the songs on TV shows. She performed "Love Song" on Japan's 2010 Best Artist, and on Music Station Super Live along with her classic "M". She also performed "Virgin Road" on the 61st Kohaku Uta Gassen awards, performing for the red team. Hamasaki also promoted her singles "Crossroad" and "L" by performing the songs on them during her the final leg of her Rock'n'Roll Circus tour in early October. The music videos for Love Song, Last Angel, and Do It Again were all filmed in Los Angeles during November 2010. "Love Song" was the December 2010 theme for Japan TV show "Sukkiri!!". It was also given a special release at the Japanese online music shop mu-mo in a cappella version

== Track listing ==
All lyrics are written by Ayumi Hamasaki, except #16 by Mitsuko Komuro.

Disc 1: CD or USB
No.	Title	Music	Arranger(s)	Length
1.	"Love Song"	Tetsuya Komuro	Yuta Nakano	4:21
2.	"Crossroad"	Tetsuya Komuro	Tetsuya Komuro	4:46
3.	"Moon"	Yasuhiko Hoshino	Yuta Nakano	5:47
4.	"Sending Mail"	Tetsuya Komuro	Yuta Nakano	4:32
5.	"Last Angel"	Tetsuya Komuro	CMJK	5:44
6.	"Insomnia"	CMJK	CMJK	2:02
7.	"Like a Doll"	Tetsuya Komuro	CMJK	4:57
8.	"Aria"	Yuta Nakano	Yuta Nakano	1:35
9.	"Blossom"	Yasuhiko Hoshino	Yuta Nakano	4:07
10.	"Thank U"	Tetsuya Komuro	Yuta Nakano	5:29
11.	"Sweet Season"	Noriyuki Makihara	Shingo Kobayashi	5:04
12.	"Overture"	Yuta Nakano	Yuta Nakano	1:46
13.	"Do It Again"	Tetsuya Komuro	Yuta Nakano	5:51
14.	"November"	Tetsuya Komuro	CMJK	5:33
15.	"Virgin Road"	Tetsuya Komuro	Yuta Nakano	5:55

CD+DVD (Regular edition) / CD-only bonus track
No.	Title	Music	Arranger(s)	Length
16.	"Seven Days War"	Tetsuya Komuro	CMJK	5:00

CD+DVD (First pressing) / USB+microSD bonus track
No.	Title	Music	Length
16.	"Seven Days War" (Live at Yoyogi on Oct.11.2010)	Tetsuya Komuro	6:52

DVD
No.	Title	Director(s)	Length
1.	"Moon" (video clip)	Hideaki Sunaga
2.	"Blossom" (video clip (director's cut))	Takahide Ishii
3.	"Crossroad" (video clip)	Masashi Muto
4.	"Sweet Season" (video clip)	Luis Hernandez
5.	"Virgin Road" (video clip)	Masashi Muto
6.	"Last Angel" (video clip)	Masashi Muto
7.	"Love Song" (video clip)	Masashi Muto
8.	"Do It Again" (video clip)	Masashi Muto
9.	"Moon" (making clip)
10.	"Crossroad" (making clip)
11.	"Sweet Season" (making clip)
12.	"Virgin Road" (making clip)
13.	"Last Angel & Love Song" (making clip #1)
14.	"Last Angel & Love Song" (making clip #2)
15.	"Do It Again" (making clip)

=== JacketA ===
CD+DVD

- Limited edition includes the access card on which the serial number for premium digital contents for mobile phone was printed.
- Bonus track: Live at Yoyogi on Oct.11.2010 (limited edition), Original version (standard edition)

=== JacketB ===
CD

- Limited edition includes the access card on which the serial number for premium digital contents for mobile phone was printed.
- Bonus track: Original version

=== JacketC ===
USB+microSD

- USB: all songs in 48 kHz, 24 bit wave format, included all the contents from CD
- microSD: SD-VIDEO format, included all the contents from CD and video clips #1-8 from DVD
- Bonus track: Live at Yoyogi on Oct.11.2010
- Photobook: LP-size, exclusive photobook (12 pages)

== Charts ==
=== Weekly charts === : Chart (2010) / Peak position; Japanese Albums (Oricon) / 1; === Monthly charts === : Chart (2010) / Peak position; Japanese Albums (Oricon) / 3	=== Year-end charts === : Chart (2010) / Position; Japanese Albums (Oricon) / 23

== Certifications and sales ==
Region	Certification	Certified units/sales
Japan (RIAJ)	Platinum	300,000
