= Colours (Ayumi Hamasaki album) =

- CD and DVD, and digital download artwork

Studio album by Ayumi Hamasaki
- Released: July 2, 2014
- Recorded: 2013–2014
- Studios: Record Plant Recording Studios (Los Angeles, California); Prime Sound Studio Form, Avex Studio, Avex Studio Azabu (Tokyo, Japan)
- Genres: J-pop; EDM; trance; pop-rock
- Labels: Avex Trax; Avex Entertainment Inc.; Avex Taiwan
- Producers: Andy Kautz; Armin van Buuren; Benno de Goeij; Daishi Dance; De Paris; DJ Hello Kitty; Fedde Le Grand; M-Flo; Darkchild; Rush

Ayumi Hamasaki chronology
| Love Again (2013) | Colours (2014) | Love Classics (2015) |

Singles from Colours
- 1. "Feel the Love / Merry-Go-Round" Released: December 25, 2013; 2. "Terminal" Released: October 1, 2014

Colours is the fifteenth studio album by Japanese recording artist Ayumi Hamasaki. It was released on July 2, 2014, in Japan by Avex Trax, worldwide by Avex Entertainment Inc., and on July 18 in Taiwan by Avex Taiwan. The songs on the album were entirely written by Hamasaki, while production was led by long-time collaborator Max Matsuura; it also included a variety of Western producers such as Armin van Buuren, members from RedOne Productions De Paris and Rush, Darkchild, and Fedde Le Grand, among others. This became Hamasaki's first studio album to have not been fully produced by Matsuura, and her first album to incorporate a large amount of English language. Musically, Colours is an electronic dance music album.

Upon its release, Colours received favorable reviews from music critics. Critics commended the material and how Hamasaki included more producers outside of Matsuura, alongside praising the production. Commercially, it was not as successful as her predecessor records in Japan, reaching number five on the Oricon Albums Chart. It is her lowest charting album in Japan, sold 53,406 units by the end of the year, and featured a similar run in other charts in other Asian territories. Each track from the album was released as a single, with "Feel the Love"/"Merry-Go-Round" and "Terminal" entering the Oricon Singles Chart.

To promote the album, Hamasaki commenced two concert tours in Japan; the first was her annual Countdown Live for 2013 leading onto 2014, and her 2014 Premium Showcase: Feel the Love tour that visited Tokyo, Osaka, and Nayoga city. The concerts were generally a success, and spawned two live video releases. Hamasaki was then part of the 2014 A-Nation concert tour. Hamasaki further promoted the album with several business and endorsement endeavours, including theme songs that were adapted from the album and other musical releases.

== Background and recording ==
In October 2013, Hamasaki announced she had worked on new music when she revealed the release details of her single "Feel the Love"/"Merry-Go-Round", which was her first physical release in three years. Then in May 2014, Japanese music publication Jame World confirmed the involvement of Western musicians and producers RedOne, Rodney Jenkins, who uses the alias Darkchild, and Fedde Le Grand, among others that were unannounced at the time. Titled Colours, the songs on the album were entirely written by Hamasaki, while production was led by long-time collaborator Max Matsuura. It also included a variety of Western producers including RedOne Production's members De Paris and Rush, Darkchild, and Grand, plus Andy Kautz, Armin van Buuren, and Benno de Goeij, and Japanese musicians Daishi Dance, DJ Hello Kitty, and M-Flo. This became Hamasaki's first studio album to have not been fully produced by Matsuura, although he did fully contribute to the tracks "Hello New Me", "Pray", and "Now & 4Eva".

Hamasaki began recording the album in 2013 at the Record Plant studios in Los Angeles, California, where she was living at the time. There, she recorded the tracks "Feel the Love", "XOXO", "Terminal", "Angel", "Merry-Go-Round", and "Lelio". In an interview with Japanese magazine S Cawaii, she stated that one of the reasons she moved to Los Angeles was in order to base her work there and her personal life in Japan; she quoted, "Now that I'm living in L.A., I thought 'I want to do work I could only do in L.A.' I was very proactive about it." She carried on with the development of the album while preparing for her annual 2013-2014 Countdown Live concert tour in Japan. While she was in Tokyo, Japan, she recorded the tracks "Hello New Me", "Pray", and "Now & 4Eva" at Prime Sound Studio Form, Avex Studio, and Avex Studio Azabu.

== Composition and songs ==
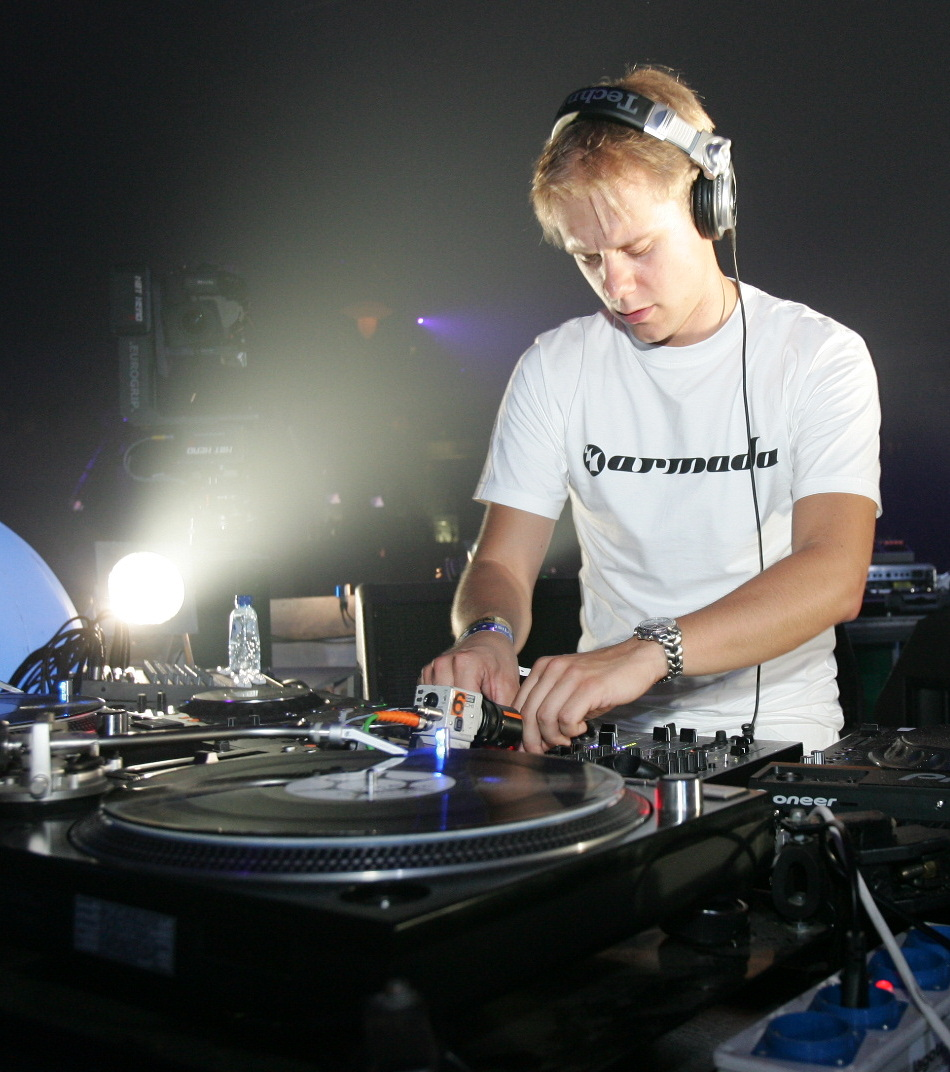
The album track "Terminal" was Hamasaki's first collaboration with Dutch DJ Armin van Buuren (pictured) in over 10 years since their collaboration effort on her track "Appears".

Musically, Colours is an electronic dance album. In a short commentary on Hamasaki's website, she stated that the album was influenced by dance music. Alongside with several new producers, Hamasaki and Avex Trax enlisted a wide range of musicians and composers to help with the album, including Tetsuya Komuro, John Mamann, AJ Junior, among others. The majority of the album's content was written by Hamasaki in English and Japanese. According to the lyric booklets that came with the physical formats of the album, the tracks "Feel the Love", "XOXO", and "Angel" are performed bilingually, while the remaining content apart from "Lelio" are recorded primarily in Japanese. The track "Lelio" was recorded in English with additional Japanese lyrics throughout the verses. (Note: Each track from Colours, apart from full-written Japanese tracks, were recorded with Japanese and English.) The album track "Merry-Go-Round" includes guest vocals of Japanese rapper Verbal, who also contributed to the song writing and composition of the single.

The album opens with "Feel the Love", which is an EDM–pop song that was composed by Komuro and produced by DJ Hello Kitty. DJ Hello Kitty provided an additional remix to the physical release of the single. "XOXO" was produced by RedOne Production members De Paris and Rush Aziz, while the composition was handled by Junior, Ameerah A. Roelants, Aziz, Mamann, and Yohanne Simon. Musically, it is an uptempo dance-pop song that was compared by a reviewer at KKBox.com to the work of American recording artist Lady Gaga. "What Is Forever Love" is a duet with Japanese recording artist Naoya Urata from the band AAA, and includes the instrumentation of pianos and synthesizers. "Hello New Me" and "Pray" was noted by a CD Journal staff member as pop ballads.

The sixth track on the album is "Terminal", which was composed and produced by Armin van Buuren and Benno de Goeij. It is Hamasaki's second album track to have not been produced by Matsuura, her first being "Connected", which was produced by Ferry Corsten and appeared on her fourth studio album I Am... (2002). Musically, it is a dance song that incorporates elements of trance music and EDM. "Angel" was composed by Darkchild, Andy Kautz, and Ardita Satka, and was noted by Gwendolyn Ng at The Straits Times as an EDM song. The eighth song on the album was the M-Flo-produced "Merry-Go-Round", which was described by Dinah Congying Chen at Asia Pacific Arts, a newspaper published by the University of Southern California, as another EDM track. "Lelio" was noted by Dato at Kkbox.com as an "aggressive" tune by Dato, while the closing song "Now & 4Eva" was composed by Japanese musician Kazuhiro Hara.

== Release ==
Colours was released on July 2, 2014, in Japan by Avex Trax, worldwide by Avex Entertainment Inc., and on July 18 in Taiwan by Avex Taiwan. The album was released in six formats, the first being a stand-alone CD that features the 10 songs. The CD and DVD version includes the 10 tracks, plus 10 videos for the official and behind the scenes of the tracks "Feel the Love", "XOXO", "Angel", "Merry-Go-Round", and "Lelio". The CD and Blu-Ray versions feature the same tracks as the CD and DVD version, but display a different album cover. Two limited edition versions of the DVD and Blu-Ray bundles were made available through Hamasaki's fan club website TeamAyu, which featured the same track list on both formats but came with a promo sticker and a Milena's brand aroma candle scented with "Boutique". The final format was the wide digital release, which included the same 10 tracks. The album artwork and promotional photos was photographed by G.T.Gan, which featured Hamasaki holding her arms against her head. The album artworks were published through Hamasaki's website on June 16, 2014, alongside the tracks that were featured.

== Reception ==
Professional ratings
Review scores
| Source | Rating |
|---|---|
| AllMusic | 3/5 stars |

Upon its release, Colours received favorable reviews from music critics. An editor from CD Journal complimented Hamasaki's approach to electronic dance music, and commended the variety of producers who helmed the album. Specifically, the review pointed out "Feel the Love", "Merry-Go-Round", and "Hello New Me" as the best tracks on the album. Similarly, Dato from KKbox.com was positive in his review and praised Hamasaki's approach to electronic dance music. He also noted the "fun" appeal to the album, and recommended the tracks "Feel the Love", "Hello New Me", "Pray", "XOXO", "What Is Forever Love", and "Lelio" from the album. Linshu Yan from The China Times did not review the album extensively, but labelled the sound and production as "fine", and highlighted the track "XOXO".

Commercially, Colours was not as successful as Hamasaki's previous records in Japan. It became her first to debut outside the top three on the Oricon Albums Chart, ranking at number five, and earned the singer the lowest first week sales of her career at the time, with 39,295 units sold. The album's opening sales performance was attributed to a lack of promotion and stiff competition by other artists at the time, as described by Japanese publications. It dropped to number 16 the following week, Hamasaki's first album to not remain inside the top ten for at least two weeks, with sales of 6,122 units. It slipped to number 31 the following week, with 2,922 units sold, and left the top 50 the week after. By the end of 2014, the album had sold 53,406 cumulative units and ranked at number 98 on Oricon's Annual Chart. Despite its more minimal success, Colours became Hamasaki's 47th record to chart within the top ten on the Oricon Albums Chart, making her the second artist in Japanese music history to achieve this, after Yumi Matsutoya. Elsewhere, the album reached numbers 75 and 16 on the South Korean Gaon Albums Chart and International Albums Chart respectively.

The first was a double A-side single that featured the songs "Feel the Love" and "Merry-Go-Round", released on December 25, 2013. It was her first physical release in three years, after her EP–single L, and both tracks received a music video. It under performed in Japan, reaching number five on the Oricon Singles Chart, and made it her lowest charting single at the time of its release. The second single was "Terminal", which was released on October 1, 2014. It was her first single to not feature a music video, her first since "Unite!" in 2001. It became her first single to miss the top 20 since her debut single "Poker Face" in 1998, and is her lowest selling single as of August 2016. "XOXO" was released on the same day as "Terminal", but was distributed as a PlugAir device in Japan and North American through Machine Shop Recordings, featuring the song, one remix, and three additional videos. The tracks "Pray" and "Hello New Me" were released as digital singles on January 27 and May 14, 2014. Both tracks peaked at number 76 and 29 on the Japan Hot 100 chart, hosted by Billboard.

To promote Hamasaki's 2014 Premium Showcase: Feel the Love concert tour in Japan, Avex Trax released three double A-side singles in specific arenas to promote the tracks as a free gift. The first release was "XOXO"/"Terminal", released between May 30 and June 1, 2014, in Nagoya, Japan. Both tracks had been promoted separately not long after, and "XOXO" received a music video that appeared on its own release format and the DVD and Blu-Ray versions of Colours. The second release was "Angel", released between June 12 in Osaka, Japan. The track received a music video, and was included on the DVD and Blu-Ray versions of the parent album. The third and final release was "What Is Forever Love"/"Now & 4Eva", released between June 3 and June 6 in Tokyo, Japan. These six tracks had been distributed through Hamasaki's TeamAyu fan club website on May 23 for streaming and digital downloads.

== Live performances and promotion ==
To promote the album, Hamasaki conducted two live concert tours and several other endorsements and releases. Hamasaki commenced her 2013–2014 Countdown Live 2013-2014 A at the Yoyogi National Gymnasium in Yoyogi Park, Tokyo. At the three concert date tour, she performed "Feel the Love" and "Merry-Go-Round" from the parent album, and eventually distributed a live DVD on April 30, 2014. She then went on her 2014 Premium Showcase: Feel the Love concert tour in Japan, where she performed the album tracks "What Is Forever Love", "Hello New Me", "Angel", "Terminal", "XOXO", "Lelio", and "Feel the Love". The tour was hosted in Tokyo, Osaka, and Nagoya city, destinations which could only allow "the newest technology and performance techniques" that "allow mechanisms only achievable in these locations". The live performance was then filmed and distributed through Avex Trax in Japan, both on DVD and Blu-Ray discs on October 22, 2014. On October 18, 2014, Hamasaki performed as the closing act in the A-Nation premium concert held at the Marina Bay Sands' MasterCard Theatres in Singapore. She had performed "XOXO" and "Lelio", alongside several other tracks from her discography; this was the second time performing in Singapore after her MTV Asia Awards performance 12 years previously.

One day before the album's release, Hamasaki promoted the album at an album launch at Tower Records in Shibuya. On June 18, 2014, weeks prior to the release of Colours, Hamasaki released a non-stop megamix album entitled EDMA; the album included short versions of the tracks "XOXO", "Lelio", "Feel the Love", "Terminal", "Angel", "Merry-Go-Round", and "What Is Forever Love". Three of the album's tracks: "Feel the Love", "Pray", and "Hello New Me" were used in advertising endorsements and films in Japan. "Feel the Love" was used as the commercial theme song for Dwango.jp, the Count Down TV chart hosted by the Tokyo Broadcasting System (TBS), and the Christmas Fair commercial. "Pray" was used as the theme song for the Japanese animated movie Buddha 2, her first recording for a movie in 12 years; Hamasaki attended the world premiere of the film in Paris, France. "Hello New Me" was used as the theme song for the 2014 Fuji television series Zoku: Saigo Kara Nibanme no Koi.

== Track listing ==
All lyrics are written by Ayumi Hamasaki. Rap lyrics in track 8 written by Verbal.

CD and digital download
| No. | Title | Music | Producer | Length |
|---|---|---|---|---|
| 1. | "Feel the Love" | Tetsuya Komuro | DJ Hello Kitty | 5:19 |
| 2. | "XOXO" | Ameerah Roelants; Yohanne Simon; John Mamann; Rush Aziz; AJ Junior | De Paris; Rush | 4:19 |
| 3. | "What Is Forever Love" | Daishi Dance; Tomoharu Moriya | Daishi Dance | 4:14 |
| 4. | "Hello New Me" | Kunio Tago | Yuta Nakano | 4:14 |
| 5. | "Pray" | Tago | Nakano | 6:17 |
| 6. | "Terminal" | Armin van Buuren; Benno de Goeij | van Buuren; de Goeij | 5:42 |
| 7. | "Angel" | Rodney Jerkins; Andy Kautz; Ardita Satka | Jerkins; Kautz | 3:44 |
| 8. | "Merry-Go-Round" | M-Flo; Unico; Jeb | Taku Takahashi; Mitsunori Ikeda | 5:07 |
| 9. | "Lelio" | Fedde le Grand; Robin Morssink; Thomas Hagenbeek; Ross Palmer; Maruja Retana | le Grand | 3:36 |
| 10. | "Now & 4Eva" | Kazuhiro Hara | Nakano | 4:34 |

DVD/Blu-ray
| No. | Title | Director(s) | Length |
|---|---|---|---|
| 1. | "Feel the Love" (Video Clip - "Ayupan × Bloody Bunny" version) | Riff Studio |
| 2. | "XOXO" (Video Clip) | A Crew |
| 3. | "Angel" (Video Clip) | A Crew |
| 4. | "Merry-Go-Round" (Video Clip) | Satoru Yokoyama |
| 5. | "Lelio" (Video Clip) | A Crew |
| 6. | "Feel the Love" (Making Clip) | Keisuke Onodera |
| 7. | "XOXO" (Making Clip) | Keisuke Onodera |
| 8. | "Angel" (Making Clip) | Keisuke Onodera |
| 9. | "Merry-Go-Round" (Making Clip) | Keisuke Onodera |
| 10. | "Lelio" (Making Clip) | Keisuke Onodera |
| 11. | "Creators Special Interview" (TeamAyu Versions only) | Keisuke Onodera |
| 12. | "A Interview" (TeamAyu Versions only) | Keisuke Onodera |

== Personnel ==
Credits adapted from the CD liner notes of Colours.

Recording and management

- Recorded at Record Plant Recording Studios, Los Angeles California, and Prime Sound Studio Form, Avex Studio, Avex Studio Azabu, Tokyo, Japan between 2013 and 2014. Management at Avex Trax in Tokyo, Japan.

Credits

- Ayumi Hamasaki – vocals, songwriting
- Yuta Nakano – backing vocals, composing, production
- Yumi Kawamura – backing vocals
- Jaycen Joshua – mixing
- Tetsuya Komuro – composing
- DJ Hello Kitty – composing, production, arrangement
- Jordan Sapp – arrangement
- Trevor Muzzy – mixing
- AJ Junior – composing
- Ameerah A. Roelants – composing
- Rush Aziz – composing, production, programming
- John Mamann – composing
- Yohanne Simon – composing, programming
- De Paris – production
- Junichiro Kawata – coordinator
- Kazuki Kumagai – coordinator
- Sakimi Kanai – coordinator
- Naoya Urata – guest vocals
- Daishi Dance – composing, production
- Tomoharu Moriya – composing
- Tomoki Ihira – guitar
- Naoki Yamada – mixing
- Kunio Tago – composing
- Yuko Kajitani Strings – music, string arrangement
- David Reitzas – mixing
- Takayuki Mogami – oboe
- Armin van Buuren – composing, production
- Benno de Goeij – composing, production
- Andy Kautz – composing, production
- Ardita Satka – composing
- Rodney Jerkins – composing, production
- Mitsunori Ikeda – arranging, programming
- Tachytelic – arranging, programming
- Jeb – composing
- Unico – composing
- M-Flo – composing, production
- Verbal – rapping, guest vocals
- Robin Morssink – mixing, composing
- Fedde Le Grand – composing, production
- Ryota Akizuki – acoustic guitar
- Yumi Kawamura – backing vocals
- Takehito Shimizu – electric guitar
- Kazuhiro Hara – composing

Additional credits

- Nobby Uno – album coordinator
- Terry Ross – album coordinator
- Mai Takamizawa – album coordinator
- Alvin Goh – creative designer
- Hidetomo Yoneda – direction
- Bradford H. Smith – engineer
- Dustin Capulong – engineer
- Ryan Kaul – engineer
- Ryota Gomi – engineer
- Shuhei Shimizu – engineer
- Yuji Tanaka – engineer
- Yujiro Yonetsu – engineer
- Yushi Iwata – engineer
- Koji Sato – management (composing)
- Tadayoshi Matsuzaka – management (composing)
- Tomonori Takeda – management (composing)
- Yuki Iwabuchi – management (composing)
- Alam Melina – management (production)
- Daisaku Ito – management (production)
- Dick de Groot – management (production)
- Gesine Pertenbreiter – management (production)
- Jr. Regisford – management (production)
- Hiroki Nakajima – management (production)
- Ichiro Shimizu – management (production)
- John Witsenburg – management (production)
- Kevin Inoue – management (production)
- Maykel Piron – management (production)
- Nadine van Bodegraven – management (production)
- Noboru Kuroda – management (production)
- Ray Hatayama – management (production)
- Sachiko Hanai – management (production)
- Susanne Wolffensperger – management (production)
- Takashi Honda – management (production)
- Dave Kutch – mastering
- G.T.Gan – photography
- Hideaki Jinbu – recording
- Hiroshi Sato – recording
- Koji Morimoto – recording
- Naoki Yamada – recording
- Yuichi Nagayama – recording

== Charts ==
=== Weekly charts ===
Weekly chart performance for Colours
| Chart (2014) | Peak position |
|---|---|
| Japanese Albums (Oricon) | 5 |
| South Korean Albums (Gaon) | 75 |
| South Korea Overseas Albums (Gaon) | 16 |

=== Monthly charts ===
Monthly chart performance for Colours
| Chart (2014) | Position |
|---|---|
| Japanese Albums (Oricon) | 12 |

=== Yearly charts ===
Year-end chart performance for Colours
| Chart (2014) | Position |
|---|---|
| Japanese Albums (Oricon) | 98 |

== Sales ==
| Region | Certification | Certified units/sales |
|---|---|---|
| Japan | — | 65,000 |

== Release history ==
| Region | Date | Format | Label |
|---|---|---|---|
| Japan | July 2, 2014 | CD | Avex Trax |
| Japan | July 2, 2014 | CD + DVD | Avex Trax |
| Japan | July 2, 2014 | CD + Blu-Ray | Avex Trax |
| Japan | July 2, 2014 | TeamAyu CD + DVD | Avex Trax |
| Japan | July 2, 2014 | TeamAyu CD + Blu-Ray | Avex Trax |
| Japan | July 2, 2014 | Digital download | Avex Entertainment Inc. |
| Australia | July 2, 2014 | Digital download | Avex Entertainment Inc. |
| New Zealand | July 2, 2014 | Digital download | Avex Entertainment Inc. |
| United Kingdom | July 2, 2014 | Digital download | Avex Entertainment Inc. |
| Ireland | July 2, 2014 | Digital download | Avex Entertainment Inc. |
| Germany | July 2, 2014 | Digital download | Avex Entertainment Inc. |
| Spain | July 2, 2014 | Digital download | Avex Entertainment Inc. |
| France | July 2, 2014 | Digital download | Avex Entertainment Inc. |
| Italy | July 2, 2014 | Digital download | Avex Entertainment Inc. |
| Taiwan | July 2, 2014 | Digital download | Avex Entertainment Inc. |
| United States | July 2, 2014 | Digital download | Avex Entertainment Inc. |
| Canada | July 2, 2014 | Digital download | Avex Entertainment Inc. |
| Taiwan | July 18, 2014 | CD + DVD | Avex Taiwan |
| Hong Kong | July 18, 2014 | CD + DVD | Avex Trax Hong Kong |
