= Feel the Love (Ayumi Hamasaki song) =

2013 single by Ayumi Hamasaki

- CD and DVD, and digital EP cover.

Single by Ayumi Hamasaki

from the album Colours
- A-side: "Merry-Go-Round"
- Released: December 25, 2013
- Recorded: 2013
- Genre: Electronic dance
- Length: 5:22
- Label: Avex Trax; Avex Entertainment Inc.; Avex Taiwan
- Songwriter: Ayumi Hamasaki
- Producers: Max Matsuura; DJ Hello Kitty

Ayumi Hamasaki singles chronology
"How Beautiful You Are" (2012)	"Feel the Love" / "Merry-Go-Round" (2013)	"Hello New Me" (2014)

Music video
- "Feel The Love" on YouTube

"Feel the Love" (stylized as "Feel the love") is a song recorded by Japanese recording artist Ayumi Hamasaki. It was released in six different formats on December 25, 2013 by Avex Trax, Avex Taiwan, and Avex Entertainment Inc. worldwide. It was also her first physical release in three years since her EP–single L (2010), and her first double A-side single, alongside the track "Merry-Go-Round", since "Moon" and "Blossom" that same year. The track was written by the singer, whilst production was handled by Japanese musician and long-time collaborator Max Matsuura with the assistance of DJ Hello Kitty; this marks the singer's first single to be produced with another producer outside of Matsuura. Musically, "Feel the Love" is an electronic dance song that lyrically focuses on love and having a good time.

Upon its release, "Feel the Love" received favorable reviews from music critics. Majority of them praised the composition and additional remixes on the physical release, and complimented the production. Charting together with "Merry-Go-Round", it under performed in Japan, reaching number five and was her first single to miss the top spot since her single "Daybreak" twelve years earlier. Two accompanying music videos were shot for the single; the first featuring Hamasaki singing and recording the track, whilst the second had a large-figured woman wanting to lose weight for a man. To promote the single, Hamasaki performed the track on her 2013–2014 Countdown Tour and her Premium Showcase: Feel the Love concert tour in 2014.

== Background and composition ==
On October 24, 2013, it was confirmed through Japanese publication Natalie.mu that Hamasaki would release a new double A-side single titled "Feel the Love/"Merry-Go-Round", and would serve as the singers's first physical release in three years since her EP–single L (2010). It was also her first double A-side single, alongside the track "Merry-Go-Round", since "Moon" and "Blossom" that same year. The track was written by Hamasaki, whilst production was handled by Japanese musician and long-time collaborator Max Matsuura with the assistance of DJ Hello Kitty, the latter producer emphasised as a marketing strategy to portray Hello Kitty as a DJ; this marks the singer's first single to be produced with another producer instead of a sole production by Matsuura. It also marks the first ever track or recording produced and composed by DJ Hello Kitty. Musically, "Feel the Love" is an electronic dance song that lyrically focuses on love and having a good time. The song was composed by Japanese Globe member and producer Tetsuya Komuro, and featured backing vocals by Japanese musician Yumi Kawamura; it also features synthesizers and keyboards in its instrumentation. Like the rest of the content on Hamasaki's fifteenth studio album Colours (2014), "Feel the Love" was written in both Japanese and English language, with the latter being most prominent on this song. (Note: Each track from Colours, apart from full-written Japanese tracks, were recorded with Japanese and English. Can be accessed through lyric booklet on album.)

== Release ==
"Feel the Love"/"Merry-Go-Round" was released in six different formats on December 25, 2013 by Avex Trax, Avex Taiwan, and Avex Entertainment Inc. worldwide, and served as the lead single and double A-side release from her album Colours. The CD release featured the two original recordings and the original instrumental versions, plus a remix for "Feel the Love" by DJ Hello Kitty and Blasterjaxx. The CD and DVD format featured the same track listing, but also included the video clips to "Feel the Love" and "Merry-Go-Round". A limited edition CD and DVD format was distributed through Hamasaki's fan club website TeamAyu, which included the same track listing on both discs but featured a bonus interview by Hamasaki on the latter DVD disc. The digital EP included the same track listing. The DJ Hello Kitty and Blasterjaxx remixes were distributed separated worldwide on iTunes Store the same day, but included the dub and instrumental mixes. To promote the singles' same release date on Christmas Day and for Hamasaki's Countdown Concert tour for New Year's Day for 2014, Avex Trax distributed three music cards featuring the same content; the first was a promotional shot from the single's photoshoot, whilst the latter two celebrated Christmas and New Years with her signature AyuPan character design. The cover artwork for the single releases were photographed by Gori Kumamoto, and featured Hamasaki in a beige-colored dress.

== Reception ==
Upon its release, "Feel the Love" received favorable reviews from music critics. A staff member at Japanese music magazine CD Journal highlighted DJ Hello Kitty and Tetsuya Komuro's contribution to the single, and praised the electronic dance composition. Alongside this, a separate review for her album Colours at CD Journal selected it as one of the best tracks. Dato from KKbox.com was generally positive towards the composition by Komuro, but criticized the generic and "brainwashing" production for following the electronic sound. However, he selected it as one of his recommended tracks from the album. Similarly, a member from Mojim.com praised the "bright" and "catchy" production and commended its overall commercial appeal.

Charting together with "Merry-Go-Round", it under performed in Japan. It debuted at number five on the Oricon Singles Chart, selling 30,385 units in its first week. It became her first single to miss the top spot since her single "Daybreak" twelve years earlier, and one of her lowest first week sales in her career. It fell to number 16 the following week, selling 4,704 units, and eventually lasted for six weeks on the chart. By the end of 2014, it sold 37,366 units. It reached number seven on the Billboard Hot Singles Sales chart in Japan as a collective, and number 51 and 13 as a singular track on the Radio Songs and Japan Hot 100 chart.

== Music videos ==
Small projections of Hamasaki singing the song on the Yusuke Azumaya–video version of "Feel the Love".

Three music videos were shot for the single; one by Yusuke Azumaya, the second being a lyric video, and the third directed and animated by Riff Studios. Azumaya's version opens with a large-figured woman cutting images of herself and sticking them on portraits of a blonde male. As she sticks it on her wall, she begins a quest to lose weight for the man in the photo, and starts running and exercising in Los Angeles, California. Throughout the entire video, it has the woman running to different locations and trying different workouts with the public, whilst small animations of her exercising are added into small parts. Near the end of the video, the girl decides to get a makeover, whilst a stylist dresses her in a pink dress. She runs towards the man in a park, though he is disinterested and walks away. A man holding a balloon bumps into the woman, and as the camera pans away to the balloons floating towards the sky, the woman turns into Hamasaki. The man who walked away from the woman then sees Hamasaki, walks to her, and both hug each other.

The second version was a lyric video, which features Hamasaki in a recording studio. It also features candid photos of Hamasaki in Los Angeles, Japan, and doing other endeavours outside of music. The Riff Studio version features Hamasaki as her character design AyuPan and a rabbit character titled the Bloody Bunny. Both of them are in a space ship, and travel throughout different worlds and atmospheres, until landing on a planet with blue aliens. The aliens appear to be sad, whist AyuPan and the Bloody Bunny stand there. AyuPan then plays the song from her space ship, and makes the aliens feel happy; they all begin dancing to the track. It ends with the world turning pink instead of blue, and has heart shapes around it. This version premiered one week before the album's release on July 2, and was included on the DVD and Blu-Ray versions of Colours.

== Promotion ==
To promote the single, it was used as the theme song for the December 2013 Count Down TV chart, hosted by Tokyo Broadcasting System (TBS), and the Christmas Fair commercial in Japan. Hamasaki performed the track on her 2013–2014 A Countdown Live show at the Yoyogi National Gymnasium in Yoyogi Park, Tokyo. It was included on the track listing for the live DVD, released on April 30, 2014. She then commenced her 2014 Premium Showcase: Feel the Love concert tour in Japan, and included it on the track listing for Tokyo, Osaka, and Nagoya cities. The live performance was then filmed and distributed through Avex Trax in Japan, both on DVD and Blu-Ray discs on October 22, 2014. On June 18, 2014, weeks prior to the release of Colours, Hamasaki released a non-stop megamix album entitled EDMA, which included the track and other songs from Colours.

== Tracklist and formats ==
- CD single
1. "Feel the Love" (Original mix) – 5:22
2. "Merry-Go-Round" (Original mix) – 5:09
3. "Feel the Love" (DJ Hello Kitty Remix) – 5:25
4. "Feel the Love" (Blasterjaxx Remix) – 5:30
5. "Feel the Love" (Original mix) [Instrumental] – 5:22
6. "Merry-Go-Round" (Original mix) [Instrumental] – 5:09
- CD and DVD single
1. "Feel the Love" (Original mix) – 5:22
2. "Merry-Go-Round" (Original mix) – 5:09
3. "Feel the Love" (DJ Hello Kitty Remix) – 5:25
4. "Feel the Love" (Blasterjaxx Remix) – 5:30
5. "Feel the Love" (Original mix) [Instrumental] – 5:22
6. "Merry-Go-Round" (Original mix) [Instrumental] – 5:09
7. "Feel the Love" (Music video)
8. "Merry-Go-Round" (Music video)
- DJ Hello Kitty Remixes
1. "Feel the Love" (DJ Hello Kitty Dub Remix) – 5:25
2. "Feel the Love" (DJ Hello Kitty Instrumental Remix) – 5:25
- Music cards
1. "Feel the Love" (Original mix) – 5:22
2. "Merry-Go-Round" (Original mix) – 5:09
3. "Feel the Love" (DJ Hello Kitty Remix) – 5:25
4. "Feel the Love" (Blasterjaxx Remix) – 5:30
5. "Feel the Love" (Original mix) [Instrumental] – 5:22
6. "Merry-Go-Round" (Original mix) [Instrumental] – 5:09
- Digital EP
1. "Feel the Love" (Original mix) – 5:22
2. "Merry-Go-Round" (Original mix) – 5:09
3. "Feel the Love" (DJ Hello Kitty Remix) – 5:25
4. "Feel the Love" (Blasterjaxx Remix) – 5:30
5. "Feel the Love" (Original mix) [Instrumental] – 5:22
6. "Merry-Go-Round" (Original mix) [Instrumental] – 5:09
- Blasterjaxx Remixes
1. "Feel the Love" (Blasterjaxx Dub Remix) – 5:29
2. "Feel the Love" (Blasterjaxx Instrumental Remix) – 5:29
- US digital single
1. "Feel the Love" (Original mix) – 5:22
2. "Merry-Go-Round" (Original mix) – 5:09

== Credits and personnel ==
Credits adapted from the CD liner notes of "Feel the Love"/"Merry-Go-Round".

Recording and management

- Recorded and mixed at Record Plant Studios, Los Angeles, California in 2013. Management by Avex Trax.

Credits

- Ayumi Hamasaki – vocals, songwriting, backing vocals
- Yumi Kawamura – backing vocals
- Tetsuya Komuro – composition
- DJ Hello Kitty – production, arrangement, programming
- Hidetomo Yoneda – art direction
- Tomokazu Suzuki – art design
- Dave Kutch – mastering
- Jaycen Joshua – mixing
- Gori Kumamoto – photography
- Max Matsuura – production
- Yusuke Azumaya – music video director

== Charts and sales ==
=== Weekly charts ===
Chart (2013–2014)	Peak position
Japan Hot 100 (Billboard)	13
Japan Hot Single Sales Chart (Billboard)	7
Japan Radio Songs Chart (Billboard)	53
Japan Weekly Chart (Oricon)	5

=== Sales ===
Region	Certification	Certified units/sales
Japan	—	37,366

== Release history ==
Region	Date	Format	Label
Japan	December 25, 2013	CD	Avex Trax
Japan	December 25, 2013	CD and DVD	Avex Trax
Japan	December 25, 2013	Digital download	Avex Trax
Japan	December 25, 2013	Music Cards (3x)	Avex Trax
Taiwan	December 25, 2013	CD	Avex Taiwan
Taiwan	December 25, 2013	CD and DVD	Avex Taiwan
Taiwan	December 25, 2013	Digital download	Avex Taiwan
Japan	December 25, 2013	Digital download	Avex Entertainment Inc.
Australia	December 25, 2013	Digital download	Avex Entertainment Inc.
New Zealand	December 25, 2013	Digital download	Avex Entertainment Inc.
United Kingdom	December 25, 2013	Digital download	Avex Entertainment Inc.
Ireland	December 25, 2013	Digital download	Avex Entertainment Inc.
Germany	December 25, 2013	Digital download	Avex Entertainment Inc.
Spain	December 25, 2013	Digital download	Avex Entertainment Inc.
France	December 25, 2013	Digital download	Avex Entertainment Inc.
Italy	December 25, 2013	Digital download	Avex Entertainment Inc.
United States	December 25, 2013	Digital download	Avex Entertainment Inc.
Canada	December 25, 2013	Digital download	Avex Entertainment Inc.
Worldwide	December 25, 2013	Remix EP	Avex Entertainment Inc.
