= How Beautiful You Are =

How Beautiful You Are may refer to:

- "How Beautiful You Are" (Ayumi Hamasaki song), a Japanese song by Ayumi Hamasaki
- "How Beautiful You Are", a single by Peter Blegvad from The Naked Shakespeare, composed by John Greaves & Peter Blegvad
  - "How Beautiful You Are", a cover by Leo Sayer from the 1984 album Have You Ever Been in Love
- How beautiful you are, a composition for 5 voices by John Zorn
- "How Beautiful You Are", a song by The Cure from the 1987 album Kiss Me, Kiss Me, Kiss Me
- "How Beautiful You Are", a song by The Vibrators composed by Ian Carnochan from the 2009 album Under the Radar
- "How Beautiful You Are", a song by Christian music band By the Tree from the 2006 album World on Fire
- "How Beautiful You Are", a song by Jimmy Castor
- "How Beautiful You Are", a song by Mike Merritt
- "How Beautiful You Are", a song by Geraldo & His Orchestra with Cyril Grantham, composed by Harry Parr-Davies
- "How Beautiful You Are", a song by John Spillane
