= Hello New Me =

2014 promotional single by Ayumi Hamasaki

Promotional single by Ayumi Hamasaki

from the album Colours
- Released: May 14, 2014
- Recorded: 2014
- Genre: J-Pop; Pop ballad
- Length: 4:20
- Label: Avex Trax
- Songwriters: Ayumi Hamasaki (lyrics); Tago Kunio (music)
- Producer: Max Matsuura

Ayumi Hamasaki singles chronology
"Feel the Love" / "Merry-Go-Round" (2013)	"Hello New Me" (2014)	"Terminal" (2014)

"Hello New Me" (stylized as "Hello new me") is a song by Japanese musician Ayumi Hamasaki. It was released on May 14, 2014 as the second digital single from her fifteenth studio album, Colours (2014). The song was used as the theme song for the Fuji TV drama Zoku - Saigo Kara Nibanme no Koi.

Although the song did not enter the Oricon Singles Chart, it did peak at number 29 on the Billboard Japan Hot 100 Chart. It was certified gold by the Recording Industry Association of Japan for over 100,000 downloads.

== Background ==
Hamasaki had previously recorded the gold-certified song "How Beautiful You Are" as the theme song for the first season of the drama Saigo Kara Nibanme no Koi in 2012.

For the second season, called Zoku - Saigo Kara Nibanme no Koi, the singer was approached to provide a new theme song. The song was revealed to be titled "Hello New Me", a slow but cheery ballad.

== Writing and production ==
The song's lyrics were written by Hamasaki herself, with music by Kunio Tago. Long time collaborator Yuta Nakano served as the song's arranger.

== Release ==
The song was released digitally on May 14, 2014. It was also included on her 15th studio album Colours, released on July 2, 2014.

== Promotion ==
Since "Hello New Me" was used as the opening theme of Zoku - Saigo Kara Nibanme no Koi, it was shown on TV once a week from April 17 to June 26, 2014

The song was also promoted – alongside Colours – with an advertising truck driving around the city of Tokyo. Furthermore, it was performed during Hamasaki's Premium Showcase: Feel the Love tour, which lasted from May 30 to July 6, 2014.

== Track listing ==
=== Digital download ===
No.	Title	Length
1.	"Hello New Me"	4:20

== Charts ==
Chart (2014)	Peak position
Billboard Japan Hot 100	29

== Certifications ==
Chart	Amount
RIAJ digital download certification	Gold (100,000)

== Personnel ==
Credits adapted from Discogs.

- Arrangement, Programming – Yuta Nakano
- Guitar – Tomoki Ihira
- Lyrics – Ayumi Hamasaki
- Mixing – David Reitzas
- Music – Kunio Tago
- Producer – Max Matsuura
- Strings – Yuko Kajitani Strings
