= You Were... =

- CD only artwork.

Single by Ayumi Hamasaki

from the album Rock 'n' Roll Circus
- Released: December 29, 2009
- Recorded: 2009
- Genre: Pop rock
- Label: Avex Music Creative Inc.; Avex Taiwan; Avex Trax; S.M. Entertainment
- Songwriter: Hamasaki
- Producer: Max Matsuura

Ayumi Hamasaki singles chronology
"Sunrise/Sunset (Love Is All)" (2009)	"You Were..." / "Ballad" (2009)	"Moon/Blossom" (2010)

Official Music Video
- "You Were..." on YouTube

Official Music Video
- "Ballad" on YouTube

"You Were..." (capitalized as "You were...") is a song recorded by Japanese recording artist Ayumi Hamasaki, taken from her tenth studio album, Rock 'n' Roll Circus (2010). It was written by Hamasaki with production being done by long-time collaborator Max Matsuura. The song premiered on December 29, 2009 as the album's second a-side single with the album track, "Ballad". Four formats were released for the single; a CD format, a CD and DVD bundle, a limited edition box set, and a digital download. The first three artworks feature Hamasaki laying in snow, whilst the limited edition box set has a long-shot of Hamasaki in a dress.

Musically, "You Were..." has been described as a pop ballad that borrows numerous musical elements such as pop rock. Including several instruments like electric guitars, acoustic guitars, and drums, the lyrics to "You Were..." describes Hamasaki's reflection of love. "You Were..." received mixed to favourable reviews from most music critics. Many critics commended Hamasaki's vocal performance and commended the single's composition and production. However, some critics felt the song was inferior in compared to other ballad tracks on the album.

Charting together with "Ballad", "You Were..." debuted atop Japan's Oricon Singles Chart with over 103,000 units sold in its first week of sales. It was certified gold by the Recording Industry Association of Japan (RIAJ) for physical shipments of 100,000 units in that region. "You Were..." managed to peak at number 14 on Billboard's Japan Hot 100 chart, and the top twenty on the G-Music Taiwanese Singles Chart; it was certified double platinum and platinum for digital and ringtone sales of over 750,000 units together. An accompanying music video was directed by Masashi Muto; it features Hamasaki in a winter wonderland.

== Background and composition ==
While working on her then-upcoming album Rock 'n' Roll Circus (2010), Hamasaki and her record label Avex Trax enlisted Japanese musician and businessman Max Matsuura to work with her again. This marks Hamasaki's eleventh consecutive album to be fully produced by Matsuura. "You Were..." was written by Hamasaki, and produced by Matsuura. Hazuhiro Hara served as the songs composers, with Japanese arranger and long-time collaborator HAL hired to arrange the instrumentation. HAL also served as the song's lead programmers. The song's instrumentation includes guitars, drums, strings, pianos, and subtle synthesizers. The song was recorded in late-2009 by Koji Morimoto, Masashi Hashimoto, Yuichi Nagayama at Prime Sound and Avex Studios, in Tokyo, Japan. Additional recording was handled by Dom Morley and Phill Brown at Metropolis and Sarm Studios in London, United Kingdom. "You Were..." has been described as a pop ballad that borrows numerous musical elements such as pop rock. According to a staff member from Japan's Amazon.com, they compared "You Were..." to previous winter singles released by Hamasaki. The lyrics to "You Were..." describes Hamasaki's reflection of love.

== Release and artwork ==
"You Were..." was released as an a-side single with album track "Ballad" in four different formats on December 29, 2009 by Avex Trax. The first format was a Maxi CD; this includes the original versions of "You Were...", "Ballad", and another album track "Red Line (For TA)". It follows with a music box version of "You Were...", the orchestral version of album track "Sunset (Love is All)", and the instrumental versions of the first three tracks. The second format is two DVD singles; the first version features the Maxi CD, and a DVD that includes the music videos to "You Were..." and "Ballad". A bonus making video for "Ballad" is included on the DVD. The second DVD single includes all tracks and videos apart from the music box version of "You Were...". In Hong Kong, "You Were..." served as the b-side single and "Ballad' as the a-side. The third format is a special box set that includes both DVD formats and the CD single. Each box set includes a post card with Hamasaki's logo on it and a bonus poster. The fourth and final format was a digital EP that consists the track list of the CD single format.

All four cover sleeves for "You Were.../Ballad" were photographed by Japanese photographer Kazuyoshi Shimomura. All three CD and DVD format sets features Hamasaki wearing a large white coat; she is seen lying down on snow, with each physical format featuring different poses from Hamasaki. The digital format uses the CD single art cover. Japanese designers Hiroyuki Tsuchiya and Yoshiaki Sugimoto were hired by Avex as the art designers, and is based on winter themes.

== Critical reception ==
"You Were..." received mixed to favourable reviews from most music critics. A staff reviewer from Japan's Amazon.com was positive towards the single, labelling it an "inspiring ballad". Tetsuo Hiraga from Hot Express was positive towards the single, calling it a "ballad that had drawn warmth" within its lyrics. Despite commending the song's production and Hamasaki's vocals, Hiraga believed it wouldn't turn out to be a "retrospective" song in the future. A staff member from CD Journal was positive towards the track, calling it a "unique" romantic ballad.

However, Asian Junkie editor Random J reviewed Rock 'n' Roll Circus on his personal blog, as was negative towards the song. He stated that album track "Last Links" should have been replaced as the second single because the single's quality was "better". He further stated it was the worst ballad from the album and single release, stating "Where as "You Were..." throws in the Japanese kitchen sink, "Ballad" keeps things simple and sounds better for it." Alexey Eremenko from Allmusic was fairly similar in his review, stating "The ballads are the worst offenders in this [album], but it's easy to tune out on the rest of the songs as well, despite all of their bombast."

== Commercial performances ==
Charting together as one single, "You Were..." and "Ballad" debuted at number one on the Japanese Daily Oricon Albums Chart, and stayed there for an entire week expect the weekend. However, due to Oricon's annual fifty-one-week rule, the single charted in the second week of January and not the first. (Note: Hamasaki's first-week sales were the highest for that week (the first week of January). However, Oricon's year only has fifty-one "weeks"—the first two of the year are combined.) As a result, "You Were..." and "Ballad" debuted at number one on the Japanese Weekly Oricon Singles Chart, with an estimate 103,000 sold units in its first two week of sales. (Note: Sales provided by Oricon database and are rounded to the nearest thousand copies.) It became Hamasaki's 22nd consecutive single to debut at number-one position since her 2002 single "Free & Easy", making her the first solo artist and the female artist to have 22 consecutive singles to debut at number-one position. It is also her 34th number-one single on that chart. It slipped to 13 the following week, shifting over 5,200 units. It lasted thirteen weeks on the top 200 chart, and was certified gold by the Recording Industry Association of Japan (RIAJ) for physical shipments of 100,000 units in that region.

"You Were..." peaked at 14 and 4 on the Billboard Japan Hot 100 and Hot Singles Sales chart. It lasted five weeks on the latter chart, one of her slowest charting singles to date. "You Were..." was certified double platinum and platinum for digital and ringtone downloads, shifting over 750,000 units and together selling over 850,000 combined units in Japan. "You Were..." peaked at number 14 and two on the G-Music Taiwanese Singles Chart and the G-Music East Asian Taiwanese Singles Chart. (Note: For the standard and East Asian G-Music charts; "You Were.../Ballad" 2009 week 52.)

== Promotion ==
During December 2009, Hamasaki performed live on Japanese TV shows seven times. Hamasaki was featured on the cover of four Japanese magazines during the promotion of the single. These magazines were "Sweet", "Bea's Up", "Vivi" and "S Cawaii". As of early December, there have been many promotional pictures posted around Shibuya, Shinagawa and Harajuku in Tokyo.

== Track list ==
- Japanese CD single
1. "You Were" (Original Mix) – 4:48
2. "Ballad" (Original Mix) – 5:21
3. "Red Line" (For TA) (Original Mix) – 4:28
4. "You Were" (Music Box Mix) – 5:10
5. "Sunset" (Love is All) (Orchestral Version) – 6:03
6. "You Were" (Original Mix; Instrumental) – 4:48
7. "Ballad" (Original Mix; Instrumental) – 5:21
8. "Red Line" (For TA) (Original Mix; Instrumental) – 4:28
- First Japanese DVD single
1. "You Were" (Original Mix) – 4:48
2. "Ballad" (Original Mix) – 5:21
3. "Red Line" (For TA) (Original Mix) – 4:28
4. "You Were" (Music Box Mix) – 5:10
5. "You Were" (Original Mix; Instrumental) – 4:48
6. "Ballad" (Original Mix; Instrumental) – 5:21
7. "Red Line" (For TA) (Original Mix; Instrumental) – 4:28
8. "You Were" (Music video)
9. "Ballad" (Music video)
10. "You Were" (Making video)
- Second Japanese DVD Single (Note: The second DVD single goes under the title "Ballad / You Were...".)
1. "Ballad" (Original Mix) – 5:21
2. "You Were" (Original Mix) – 4:48
3. "Red Line" (For TA) (Original Mix) – 4:28
4. "You Were" (Music Box Mix) – 5:10
5. "Ballad" (Original Mix; Instrumental) – 5:21
6. "You Were" (Original Mix; Instrumental) – 4:48
7. "Red Line" (For TA) (Original Mix; Instrumental) – 4:28
8. "You Were" (Music video)
9. "Ballad" (Music video)
10. "Ballad" (Making video)
- Digital EP
1. "You Were" (Original Mix) – 4:48
2. "Ballad" (Original Mix) – 5:21
3. "Red Line" (For TA) (Original Mix) – 4:28
4. "You Were" (Music Box Mix) – 5:10
5. "Sunset (Love is All) (Orchestral Version) – 6:03
6. "You Were" (Original Mix; Instrumental) – 4:48
7. "Ballad" (Original Mix; Instrumental) – 5:21
8. "Red Line" (For TA) (Original Mix; Instrumental) – 4:28
- Digital Music Video (Note: Music videos are released individually through iTunes Store.)
1. "You Were" (Music video)
2. "Ballad" (Music video)

== Charts and sales ==
=== Weekly charts ===
Chart (2009–2010)	Peak position
Japan Daily Singles Chart (Oricon)	1
Japan Weekly Singles Chart (Oricon)	1
Japan Hot 100 (Billboard)	14
Japan Hot Singles Sales Weekly Chart (Billboard)	4
Taiwan Weekly Singles Chart (G-Music)	14
East Asian Taiwan Weekly Singles Chart (G-Music)	2

=== Year-end charts ===
Chart (2010)	Peak position
Japan Yearly Singles Chart (Oricon)	56

== Certifications ==
Region	Certification	Certified units/sales
Japan (RIAJ) Ringtone	2× Platinum	500,000^{*}
Japan (RIAJ) Digital single	Platinum	250,000^{*}
Japan (RIAJ) physical sales	Gold	140,000
^{*} Sales figures based on certification alone.
