= Crossroad (song) =

2010 single by Ayumi Hamasaki

Single by Ayumi Hamasaki

from the album Love Songs
- Released: September 22, 2010
- Genre: J-pop
- Length: 4:51
- Label: Avex Trax
- Composer(s): Tetsuya Komuro
- Lyricist(s): Ayumi Hamasaki
- Producer(s): Max Matsuura

Ayumi Hamasaki singles chronology
"Moon/Blossom" (2010)	"Crossroad" (2010)	"L" (2010)

Music video
- "Crossroad" on YouTube

"Crossroad" (stylized as crossroad on the release cover) is a song by Japanese singer-songwriter Ayumi Hamasaki, released on September 22, 2010. The single is the second of a three-part project to celebrate the release of her 50th single, the L extended play (EP). The single is certified as a gold album by the Recording Industry Association of Japan (RIAJ) for shipments of more than 100,000 units.

== Track listings ==
All lyrics are written by Ayumi Hamasaki, except for "Seven Days War", which is a cover song of TM Network, written by Mitsuko Komuro

CD – Version A (AVCD-31934)
No.	Title	Music	Length
1.	"Crossroad" (original mix)	Tetsuya Komuro	4:52
2.	"Seven Days War" (original mix)	Tetsuya Komuro	5:01
3.	"Blossom" (Clockwork Yellow remix)	Yasuhiko Hoshino	5:54
4.	"Moon" (orchestra version)	Hoshino	4:05
5.	"Crossroad" (original mix – instrumental)	Komuro	4:52
6.	"Seven Days War" (original mix – instrumental)	Komuro	5:01

CD – Version B (AVCD-31935)
No.	Title	Music	Length
1.	"Crossroad" (original mix)	Tetsuya Komuro	4:52
2.	"Seven Days War" (original mix)	Komuro	5:01
3.	"Blossom" (Clockwork Yellow remix)	Yasuhiko Hoshino	5:54
4.	"Blossom" (orchestra version)	Hoshino	6:16
5.	"Crossroad" (original mix – instrumental)	Komuro	4:52
6.	"Seven Days War" (original mix – instrumental)	Komuro	5:01

CD+DVD version – CD (AVCD-31933)
No.	Title	Music	Length
1.	"Crossroad" (original mix)	Tetsuya Komuro	4:52
2.	"Seven Days War" (original mix)	Komuro	5:01
3.	"Blossom" (Clockwork Yellow remix)	Yasuhiko Hoshino	5:54
4.	"Crossroad" (original mix – instrumental)	Komuro	4:52
5.	"Seven Days War" (original mix – instrumental)	Komuro	5:01

CD+DVD version – DVD (AVCD-31933B)
No.	Title	Length
1.	"Crossroad" (video clip)	4:53
2.	"Crossroad" (making clip)	3:10
3.	"Blossom" (video clip; starring Hero (Kim Jaejoong) of TVXQ)	5:26

== Charts ==
Chart (2010)	Peak position
Japan (Oricon)	1
