= How Beautiful You Are (Ayumi Hamasaki song) =

2012 single by Ayumi Hamasaki

Single by Ayumi Hamasaki

from the album Party Queen
- Released: February 8, 2012
- Recorded: 2011
- Genre: Pop ballad
- Length: 5:01
- Label: Avex Trax
- Songwriters: Ayumi Hamasaki, Tim Wellard
- Producer: Max Matsuura

Ayumi Hamasaki singles chronology
"Dream On" (2010)	"How Beautiful You Are" (2012)	"Feel the Love" / "Merry-Go-Round" (2013)

Music video
- "How Beautiful You Are" on YouTube

"How Beautiful You Are" is a song by Japanese musician Ayumi Hamasaki. It was released on February 8, 2012, as the leading digital single from her thirteenth studio album, Party Queen. The song was used at the theme song for the Kyōko Koizumi-starring Fuji Television drama Saigo Kara Nibanme no Koi.

== Background ==
The single was the second time Hamasaki had released an official single digitally after "Together When..." (2007), the leading song from her album Guilty. It had been three years since a song by Hamasaki had been used as a drama theme song, since "Sunrise (Love Is All)"'s use for Dandy Daddy?.

For the second series of Saigo Kara Nibanme no Koi in 2014, a new song by Hamasaki, "Hello New Me", served as the theme song.

== Writing and production ==
The music of the song was written by her musical collaborator Tim Wellard, who first worked with Hamasaki on the song "Brillante" from her extended play Five (2011), and also wrote the songs "Party Queen", "The Next Love" and "Eyes, Smoke, Magic" for Party Queen. Fuji Television director Hiroki Wakamatsu commissioned Hamasaki for the drama's theme song, asking her to write a grown-up song. Hamasaki wrote the song's lyrics after reading the drama's script.

== Music video ==
A music video was produced for the song, directed by Masashi Muto. It features Hamasaki singing in monochrome, and depicts couples of different races and sexual orientations. Japanese gay porn star Koh Masaki and his partner Tien Tien made cameos as one of the couples, a year before Masaki's death in June 2013.

The dress she wore in the video was specially made for her by Indonesian fashion designer Tex Saverio.

== Critical reception ==
The song received mixed reviews. CDJournal called the song a "beautifully magnificent ballad" that displayed Hamasaki's presence, however felt that the song's arrangement was disappointing. Music reviewer James Hadfield for Time Out Tokyo reacted strongly to the song, describing it as "wretched" and "generic".

== Track listing ==
All tracks are written by Ayumi Hamasaki, Timothy Wellard.

No.	Title	Arranger	Length
1.	"How Beautiful You Are (Original Mix)"	Yuta Nakano	5:01
2.	"How Beautiful You Are (Original Mix -Instrumental-)"	Yuta Nakano	4:59
Total length:			10:00

== Charts ==
Chart (2012)	Peak position
Japan Billboard Japan Hot 100	52
Japan RIAJ Digital Track Chart	3

== Certifications ==
Chart	Amount
RIAJ digital download certification	Gold (100,000)

== Personnel ==
Personnel details were sourced from Party Queen's liner notes booklet.

Musicians and personnel

- Ian Burdge – strings
- Ayumi Hamasaki – lyrics, vocals
- Masamichi Imafuku – additional background vocals
- Yumi Kawamura – background vocals
- Yuta Nakano – arrangement, string arrangement, programming
- David Reitzas – additional drum programming, mixing
- Timothy Wellard – music, additional background vocals

== Release history ==
Region	Date	Format	Distributing Label
Japan	February 8, 2012	Ringtone, digital download	Avex Trax
