= Ayumi Hamasaki Countdown Live 2013–2014 A =

Ayumi Hamasaki Countdown Live 2013-2014

Video by Ayumi Hamasaki
- Released: April 30, 2014
- Recorded: December 31, 2013
- Venue: Yoyogi National Gymnasium
- Genre: J-pop
- Label: Avex

Ayumi Hamasaki chronology
| Ayumi Hamasaki 15th Anniversary Tour: A Best Live (2013) | Ayumi Hamasaki Countdown Live 2013-2014 (2014) | Ayumi Hamasaki Premium Showcase: Feel the Love (2014) |

Ayumi Hamasaki Countdown Live 2013–2014 A is Japanese pop singer Ayumi Hamasaki's 13th Countdown concert DVD. It was released on April 30, 2014. Hamasaki performed three dates at the Yoyogi National Gymnasium for this countdown, respectively on December 29, 30 and 31, 2013. It was released in two formats: a DVD edition (AVBD-92110) and also a Blu-Ray one (AVXD-91692).

The DVD/Blu-ray includes the first ever live performances of the songs "Feel The Love" and "Merry-go-round". Both were released as a double A-side single called "Feel The Love/Merry-Go-Round". The single was promoted during the concert and later included on Hamasaki's 15th studio album Colours, which was released in 2014.

== Track list ==
From Amazon and Yesasia.

1. Feel the love
2. We Wish
3. Free & Easy
4. Because of You
5. Love is All
6. Carols
7. Momentum
8. Electrocinema Break
9. Is This Love?
10. Love Song
11. Merry-go-round
12. You & Me
13. Surreal ~ evolution ~ Surreal

=== Encore ===
1. Part Of Me
2. Curtain call
3. Boys & Girls
4. Humming 7/4
5. Bold & Delicious

== Sales ==
- DVD: 15,827
- Blu-ray: 5,521
- Total : 21,348
