= Party Queen =

Studio album by Ayumi Hamasaki
- Released: March 21, 2012
- Recorded: 2011–2012
- Genres: J-pop; pop rock; dance-pop; electronica
- Length: 53:04
- Label: Avex Trax
- Producer: Max Matsuura

Ayumi Hamasaki chronology
Five (2011)	Party Queen (2012)	A Summer Best (2012)

Singles from Party Queen
- 1. "How Beautiful You Are" Released: February 8, 2012 (digital release)

Professional ratings
Review scores
Source	Rating
AllMusic	3.5/5 stars

Party Queen is the thirteenth full-length studio album by Japanese singer-songwriter Ayumi Hamasaki. The album was released digitally on March 14, 2012 and physically on March 21, 2012 through Avex Trax. Primarily a pop album, Party Queen is made up mostly of dance songs and ballads. As with all of Hamasaki's albums, she wrote all of the lyrics. Composition was handled by a team of composers, as with many of her albums. Party Queen featured music videos and songs recorded in London and was her second album to do so.

Party Queen became Hamasaki's first album to feature no physical singles; however, "How Beautiful You Are" was released digitally as the album's lead single. As it lacked a physical release, "How Beautiful You Are" was ineligible to chart on the Oricon singles chart, but it did chart at number fifty-two on Billboard's Japan Hot 100, and number three on the RIAJ Digital Track Chart. The song was certified Gold by the Recording Industry Association of Japan for digital sales exceeding 100,000.

Party Queen received mixed reviews from music critics. Commercially, the album became her second to miss the Oricon's top position, debuting at number two in Japan with first-week sales of 97,691 copies, the lowest of her career at that time. It sold around 150,000 copies in Japan by the end of its chart run and received Gold certification.

== Release ==
Party Queen was released in 5 different formats: CD only version; CD+DVD version; CD+2DVD version with the second DVD being Ayumi Hamasaki Countdown Live 2011-2012: Hotel Love Songs; a special limited box set containing CD+4DVD with Ayumi Hamasaki Countdown Live 2011-2012: Hotel Love Songs, Ayumi Hamasaki Power of Music 2011 A: Limited Edition, 2 half-pint glasses and 2 cork coasters; another similar special box set containing CD+2DVD+Blu-ray, Blu-ray being Ayumi Hamasaki Power of Music 2011 A: Limited Edition.

Only 2 songs had commercial endorsements prior to the album release: "Party Queen" was used as commercial song for Peach John and "How Beautiful You Are" was the theme song for drama show "Saigokara Nibanme no Koi". And the promotional music video for the single notably featured an appearance by late gay pornographic actor Koh Masaki and his boyfriend.

To promote Party Queen after its release, Hamasaki attracted around 3,000 fans for her "Public Recording Session Event" at FM Osaka, which was held at Abeno Market Park Ceus Mall on March 27. After that, Hamasaki did Yahoo GyaO's live talk with Joshinavi.

== Track listing ==
All lyrics are written by Ayumi Hamasaki.

Disc1: CD (CD, CD+DVD, CD+2DVD)
No.	Title	Music	Arranger(s)	Length
1.	"Party Queen"	Timothy Wellard	Tasuku	3:56
2.	"NaNaNa"	Corin	CMJK	3:41
3.	"Shake It"	Bounceback	CMJK	3:49
4.	"Taskebab" (instrumental)	Tasuku	Tasuku	1:50
5.	"Call"	Katsumi Ohnishi	Tasuku	4:04
6.	"Letter"	Katsumi Ohnishi	Tasuku, Harvey Brough^{[a]}	4:41
7.	"Reminds Me"	Yuta Nakano	Tasuku, Harvey Brough^{[a]}	5:21
8.	"Return Road"	D.A.I	Yuta Nakano	4:54
9.	"Tell Me Why"	Hanif Sabzevari, Lene Dissing, Marcus Winther-John, Dimitri Stassos	CMJK	3:41
10.	"A Cup of Tea"	CMJK	CMJK	1:42
11.	"The Next Love"	Timothy Wellard	Yuta Nakano	4:04
12.	"Eyes, Smoke, Magic"	Timothy Wellard	Yuta Nakano	4:09
13.	"Serenade in A Minor"	Yuta Nakano	Yuta Nakano	2:18
14.	"How Beautiful You Are"	Timothy Wellard	Yuta Nakano	5:01

Notes

- ^{^[a]} denotes strings arrangement.

DVD-1 (CD+DVD, CD+2DVD, CD+4DVD Box set, CD+2DVD+2Blu-ray Box set)
No.	Title	Length
1.	"Shake It" (Video clip)
2.	"NaNaNa" (Video clip)
3.	"Return Road" (Video clip)
4.	"How Beautiful You Are" (Video clip)
5.	"Shake It" (Making Clip)
6.	"NaNaNa" (making clip)
7.	"Return Road" (making clip)
8.	"How Beautiful You Are" (making clip)

DVD-2: COUNTDOWN LIVE 2011-2012 ～HOTEL Love songs (CD+2DVD, CD+4DVD Box set, CD+2DVD+2Blu-ray Box set)
No.	Title	Length
1.	"Do It Again"
2.	"Happening Here"
3.	"Insomnia"
4.	"Moon"
5.	"Fated"
6.	"Feedback"
7.	"Never Ever"
8.	"Sending Mail"
9.	"Machine"
10.	"Sparkle"
11.	"Humming 7/4"
12.	"Evolution"
13.	"Rainbow"
14.	"November"
15.	"Music"
16.	"Ladies Night"
17.	"Party Queen"
18.	"Happening Here"
19.	"Love Song"
20.	"How Beautiful You Are"
21.	"Trauma~Boys & Girls"
22.	"My All"

== Release history ==
Region	Date	Format	Catalogue number
Japan	March 21, 2012	CD	AVCD-38513
Japan	March 21, 2012	CD+DVD	AVCD-38512/B
Japan	March 21, 2012	CD+2DVD	AVCD-38511/B～C
Japan	March 21, 2012	PLAYBUTTON (First press item only)	AQZD-50681
Japan	March 21, 2012	Box set (CD+4DVD+Goods)	AVZD-38500/B～E
Japan	March 21, 2012	Box set (CD+2DVD+2Blu-ray+Goods)	AVZD-38501/B～D
Taiwan	March 23, 2012	CD	AVJCD10500
Taiwan	March 23, 2012	CD+DVD	AVJCD10500/B
Taiwan	March 23, 2012	CD+2DVD	AVJCD10500/A
Hong Kong	March 29, 2012	CD	AAJCD20101
Hong Kong	March 29, 2012	CD+DVD	AAJCD20100D
Hong Kong	March 29, 2012	CD+2DVD	AAJCD20099DE

== Charts and certifications ==
=== Charts ===
Chart	Peak position	Debut sales	Total Sales	Chart run
Oricon Daily Chart	2	27,338	170,000	22 weeks
Oricon Weekly Chart	2	97,691	170,000	22 weeks
Oricon Monthly Chart	4	124,305	170,000	22 weeks
Oricon Yearly Chart	38	148,290	170,000	22 weeks

=== Certifications ===
Country	Provider	Certification
Japan	RIAJ	Gold
