= Second to Last Love =

- Promotional poster (Season 1)
- Also known as: My Second Last Love
- Genre: Romance, Drama
- Written by: Yoshikazu Okada
- Directed by: Rieko Miyamoto, Masaki Tanimura, Michiko Namiki, Yusuke Kato, Ryo Miyawaki
- Starring: Kyōko Koizumi; Kiichi Nakai; Naoko Iijima; Kenji Sakaguchi; Yuki Uchida
- Opening theme: "Hello New Me" by Ayumi Hamasaki (season 2) "Mimosa" by Ayumi Hamasaki (season 3)
- Ending theme: "How Beautiful You Are" by Ayumi Hamasaki (season 1) "Teijiro" by Kyōko Koizumi and Kiichi Nakai (season 2)
- Composer: Atsushi Hirasawa
- Country of origin: Japan
- Original language: Japanese
- No. of seasons: 3
- No. of episodes: 34

Production
- Producers: Hiroki Wakamatsu, Sumi Asano
- Production location: Kamakura, Kanagawa
- Running time: 54 minutes

Original release
- Network: Fuji TV
- Release: January 12, 2012 – June 26, 2014

Related
- Second to Last Love (South Korean TV series)

Second to Last Love, or Saigo Kara Nibanme no Koi (最後から二番目の恋, My Second Last Love), is a Japanese television drama series, starring Kyōko Koizumi and Kiichi Nakai. The series aired Thursdays at 22:00 - 22:54, on Fuji Television from January 12, to March 22, 2012.

A second season entitled Zoku—Saigo Kara Nibanme no Koi (続・最後から二番目の恋) was broadcast by Fuji TV from April 17 to June 26, 2014. In 2025, a third season— Zoku Zoku—Saigo Kara Nibanme no Koi (続・続・最後から二番目の恋)—began on April 14, 2025.

== Plot ==
Described as an adult love story, Saigo Kara Nibanme no Koi narrates the tale of Chiaki Yoshino (Kyōko Koizumi), a 45-year-old TV drama producer. As she is becoming older, Chiaki becomes increasingly more concerned about her health and retirement, instead of building romantic relationship with someone: The hope she once had of sharing her life with someone seems distant. Chiaki is subsequently troubled about deciding on taking a break from her ruling life, and such questions lead her to Kamakura, where she decides to settle. In this ancient city she meets Wahei Nagakura (Kiichi Nakai), a 50-year-old widower and father of one child who works for the city office.

Chiaki and Wahei start getting closer as they learn more about each other's lives. However, Wahei's family start obstructing the development of their relationship. Wahei's brother, Shinpei, starts courting Chiaki, creating a conflicting triangle relationship. On the other hand, Wahei's sister, Noriko, constantly harasses Chiaki. Facing these problematic family members, Chiaki and Wahei try to build and sustain their budding romance.

== Cast ==
- Kyōko Koizumi as Chiaki Yoshino
- Kiichi Nakai as Wahei Nagakura
- Kenji Sakaguchi as Shinpei Nagakura
- Mariko Watanabe as Erina Nagakura
- Hiroko Moriguchi as Keiko Araki
- Kazuyuki Asano as Hiroyuki Mizutani
- Naoko Iijima as Noriko Mizutani
- Yuki Uchida as Midori Hatanaka

== Episodes ==
=== Season 1 ===
No.	Air date	Title	Directed by	Ratings
1	January 12, 2012	There aren't adults who aren't lonely (寂しくない大人なんていない)	Rieko Miyamoto	12.1%
2	January 19, 2012	Being single is a freedom that ends hurting (ひとりって切ないくらい自由)	Rieko Miyamoto	12.8%
3	January 26, 2012	Don't laugh at adults enjoying their youth! (大人の青春を笑うな!)	Rieko Miyamoto	11.8%
4	February 2, 2012	Aging is a heart-wrenching thing for a woman (女が年取るってせつないよね)	Masaki Tanimura	11.4%
5	February 9, 2012	What will the last love of my life be? (人生最後の恋って何だろう)	Michiko Namiki	12.6%
6	February 16, 2012	Unlike any love until now (今迄のどんな恋にも似てない)	Rieko Miyamoto	11.7%
7	February 23, 2012	How should I love? (恋ってどうすれば良いんだ?)	Masaki Tanimura	13.1%
8	March 1, 2012	An adult's kiss is painful but laughable (大人のキスは切なくて笑える)	Rieko Miyamoto	11.5%
9	March 8, 2012	A kiss can be as eloquent as one's words (キスは口ほどにものを言う)	Masaki Tanimura	12.3%
10	March 15, 2012	Even an adult's future shines (大人の未来だって、輝いてる)	Rieko Miyamoto	13.0%
11	March 22, 2012	A love that hasn't ended yet (まだ恋は終わらない〜最終回)	Rieko Miyamoto	13.7%
Average rating: 12.4%

=== Special ===
No.	Air date	Title	Directed by	Ratings
1	November 2, 2012	Saigo Kara Nibanme no Koi 2012 Aki (最後から二番目の恋 2012秋)	Rieko Miyamoto	10.6%

=== Season 2 ===
No.	Air date	Title	Directed by	Ratings
1	April 17, 2014	It's difficult to deal with adultness' youth (大人の青春って、始末に負えない)	Rieko Miyamoto	14.0%
2	April 24, 2014	The grownups who suck at romance (恋愛下手な大人たち)	Rieko Miyamoto	13.7%
3	May 1, 2014	Bury a past love with laughter (過去の恋は、笑って葬れ)	Yusuke Kato	12.2%
4	May 8, 2014	My life, miscalculated (私の人生、計算外)	Yusuke Kato	12.2%
5	May 15, 2014	What exactly is an adult being? (全く大人って生き物は...)	Rieko Miyamoto	12.8%
6	May 22, 2014	Even so, life is wonderful (それでも人生は素敵だ)	Ryo Miyawaki	11.2%
7	May 29, 2014	Get older and purify yourself (歳を重ねてピュアになる)	Yusuke Kato	12.1%
8	June 5, 2014	Every adult is a problem child (大人はみんな問題児。)	Ryo Miyawaki	13.3%
9	June 12, 2014	There's nothing wrong with an adult crying out of love (恋で泣く大人も悪くない)	Yusuke Kato	12.4%
10	June 19, 2014	Excluding love, I'm doing well (恋をのぞけば、順調です)	Ryo Miyawaki	13.4%
11	June 26, 2014	Life's still funky! (人生まだまだファンキーだ!!)	Rieko Miyamoto	13.8%
Average rating: 12.9%

== Awards ==
- Tokyo Drama Awards 2013 - Excellence Award (Saigo Kara Nibanme no Koi 2012 Aki)
- Tokyo Drama Awards 2014 - Best Screenplay (Yoshikazu Okada)
