= Terminal (Ayumi Hamasaki song) =

2014 single by Ayumi Hamasaki

Single by Ayumi Hamasaki

from the album Colours
- Released: October 1, 2014
- Recorded: 2014
- Genre: Trance, progressive house
- Length: 5:44
- Label: Avex Trax
- Composers: Armin van Buuren, Benno de Goeij
- Lyricist: Ayumi Hamasaki
- Producer: Max Matsuura

Ayumi Hamasaki singles chronology
"Hello New Me" (2014)	"Terminal" (2014)	"Zutto.../Last Minute/Walk" (2014)

"Terminal" is a song by Japanese musician Ayumi Hamasaki. Produced by Dutch trance DJ Armin van Buuren, the song was released as a single from her fifteenth studio album Colours on October 1, 2014.

== Background ==
Re-cut singles that were songs present on an already released album were common in Hamasaki's career, however "Terminal" is the first instance since "Daybreak" from her fourth studio album I Am..., released in 2002.

Hamasaki had first collaborated with Armin van Buuren in 2001, when he remixed her song "Appears" for Cyber Trance Presents Ayu Trance, with "Appears (Armin van Buuren's Sunset Dub)" later appearing on Cyber Trance Presents Ayu Trance 2 (2002).

== Writing and production ==
The song was written and produced by Armin van Buuren, as well as his long-time collaborator Benno de Goeij. The dub remix featured on the single was used by van Buuren in his personal DJ sets. Hamasaki recorded the vocals for the song at Record Plant Recording Studios in Los Angeles.

== Release and promotion ==
For Hamasaki's Premium Showcase: Feel the Love tour in May and June 2014, tour exclusive singles were released at each of the three venues she performed at. For her performances at the Nippon Gaishi Hall in Nagoya on May 30, May 31 and June 1, 2014, a single featuring "XOXO" and "Terminal" was released. The song was first performed at the showcase, in a trance DJ set also featuring "Connected" (2002). The song was initially given a wide release on June 18, when the Colours album was released digitally.

The dub mix of the song was released globally on September 15, though van Buuren's label Armind. It also featured on A State Of Trance at Ushuaïa, Ibiza 2014, a mix CD created by van Buuren compiling the music played at his residency show at the Ushuaïa Beach Hotel in Ibiza. The single's Japanese release was timed to be released at the same time as Ultra Japan, an EDM festival in Odaiba, Tokyo held on September 27 and 28, 2014. On the same day as the single's release, Hamasaki released her song "XOXO" as a Plug Air: a new format featuring a physical device that plugs into cellphones to stream content.

== Track listings ==
All tracks are written by Armin van Buuren and Benno de Goeij.

Digital download
No.	Title	Length
1.	"Terminal (Dub Radio Mix)"	2:53
2.	"Terminal (Dub Mix)"	4:33
Total length:		7:26

All tracks are written by Ayumi Hamasaki, Armin van Buuren and Benno de Goeij.

Japanese single
No.	Title	Length
1.	"Terminal (Original Mix)"	5:44
2.	"Terminal (Dub Mix)"	4:35
3.	"Terminal (Hackjack Mix)"	5:45
Total length:		16:04

== Personnel ==
Personnel details were sourced from "Terminal"'s liner notes booklet.

Musicians and personnel

- Armin van Buuren – music, production
- Benno de Goeij – music, production
- Ayumi Hamasaki – lyrics, vocals
- Dave Kutch – mastering

== Charts and sales ==
Chart (2014)	Peak position
Japan Billboard Hot Single Sales	31
Japan Oricon daily singles	16
Japan Oricon weekly singles	24

=== Sales ===
Chart	Amount
Oricon physical sales	4,000

== Release history ==
Region	Date	Format	Distributing Label	Catalogue codes
Japan	May 30, 2014	Tour exclusive single ("XOXO" / "Terminal")	Avex Trax	
Worldwide	September 15, 2014	Digital download (Dub Mix)	Armind	ARMD1196
Japan	October 1, 2014	CD, rental CD	Avex Trax	AVCD-83113
