= $4.50 Theater Company =

Japanese theater company

- 劇団4ドル50セント
- Formation: 2017
- Type: Theatre group
- Location: Japan
- Members: 50 (in 2017)
- Website: www.4dollars50cents.com

The $4.50 Theater Company (Japanese: 劇団4ドル50セント, Hepburn: Gekidan Yondoru Gojussento) is a Japanese theater company established in 2017 by two Japanese producers Yasushi Akimoto and Max Matsuura of Avex. It is operated by Avex AY Factory, LLC, a subsidiary of Avex.

== History ==
The name of the company was taken from the total amount of coins Janis Joplin, of whom producer Yasushi Akimoto is a fan, was holding in her hand when she died. The company started with 31 members, selected through auditions attended by approximately 5,000 people. Ninety percent of the selected members had no acting experience at all. Despite being a theater company, its members also perform various other activities such as modeling, participating in television shows, and music.

On October 30, 2017, the company announced that its members would appear in the advertisement for the PlayStation 4 version of Call of Duty: WWII.
