= Moon/Blossom =

Single by Ayumi Hamasaki

from the album Love Songs
- B-side: "Don't Look Back (Reggae Disco Rockers Remix)"; "Last Links (Orchestra version)"; "Meaning of Love (Piano version)"; "Microphone (The Lowbrows Remix)"
- Released: July 14, 2010
- Recorded: 2010
- Genre: Pop rock
- Label: Avex Trax
- Songwriters: Ayumi Hamasaki (lyrics); Yasuhiko Hoshino (music)
- Producer: Max Matsuura

Ayumi Hamasaki singles chronology
"You Were.../Ballad" (2009)	"Moon/Blossom" (2010)	"Crossroad" (2010)

Official Music Video
- "Moon" on YouTube

Official Music Video
- "Blossom" on YouTube

"Moon/Blossom" is Japanese singer Ayumi Hamasaki's forty-eighth (forty-ninth overall) single, released on July 14, 2010. The first song on the single "Moon" is used to promote Honda's Zest Spark Kei car while the second song "Blossom" is used to promote Zespri kiwifruit.

The song "Moon" was first released as a Chaku-Uta sample for members of Ayu's official fanclub Team Ayu with the release of the album Rock 'n' Roll Circus; the announcement of the single was publicly released first on Twitter, first by Ayu's producer Max Matsuura and then relayed into the "Ayu News" Twitter account, which was officially managed by Avex Group.

This single is her first of three singles in the "road to fiftieth (50th) single", which would be followed by Crossroad and L, and it is expected that there will be a preview for the 49th single in Chaku-Uta form, though that can only be accessible through a serial number that will be released in limited first press editions of the release, with the forty-ninth (49th) and fiftieth singles also having its own serial numbers for users to access special content, which include never-before-released pictures sent to Japanese cellphones as well as PC wallpapers, though that site is not in operation until as late as late 2010/early 2011.

A month before its release, the music video for Blossom was cancelled, and as such, the other CD/DVD version (AVCD-31892/B) was cancelled. The music video for Blossom was later released on her 49th single, Crossroad.

The single is certified Gold for shipment of 100,000 copies.

== Music video ==
A 2:56 minute clip for Moon was released on June 9, 2010 in Ayumi Hamasaki's YouTube channel. The full PV was released on July 13, 2010, a day before the single was available in stores. The video featured Ayumi singing in a European aristocratic room setting. As the video progresses a strange, black, tar-like liquid begins dropping in the room, on random furniture. The video is also inter-cut with scenes of Ayumi smiling while holding one of her pet dogs, in her second verse it shown ayumi with the black liquid falling down all over her face, near chest and going to her hands. Depicting sorrow or despair, presumably of the dog shown towards the end of the video.

- On YouTube, the music video of Moon now has approximately 1,400,000 views. The full music video runtime of moon is 05:50. The music video of Moon was directed by Masashi Muto.

The music video of Blossom was cancelled, but a music video appeared for Crossroad.

- Ayumi does not appear in the video, but it features Kim Jaejoong (of JYJ). The MV's plot starts out with Jaejoong enjoying time with his girlfriend at the beach, etc. However, in the middle of the video, Jaejoong visits to a doctor, and finds out that he is diagnosed with terminal cancer (3rd stage) and has only two weeks left to survive. Later, Jaejoong goes to meet his girlfriend to celebrate the birthday. Then, when Jaejoong's girlfriend is bringing the cake he faints. The ending scene shows Jaejoong's girlfriend a few weeks later, alone, (which means that he died the day he fainted) looking at a painting of them both, what Jaejoong was trying to paint in the beginning of the MV. The paint was her and Jaejoong as an angel. There is a director's cut of the MV as well. The running time of "Blossom" is 6:53. This music video was not uploaded to Ayumi Hamasaki's YouTube account until October 2019.

== Track listing ==
All lyrics written by Ayumi Hamasaki.

CD-Only - Version A (AVCD-31891)
No.	Title	Music	Length
1.	"Moon (Original Mix)"	Yasuhiko Hoshino	5:47
2.	"Blossom (Original Mix)"	Hoshino	4:07
3.	"Microphone (The Lowbrows Remix)"	Yuta Nakano	3:47
4.	"Last Links (Orchestra Version)"	Tetsuya Yukumi	4:43
5.	"Moon (Original Mix - Instrumental)"	Hoshino	5:47
6.	"Blossom (Original Mix - Instrumental)"	Hoshino	4:05

CD-Only - Version B (AVCD-31893)
No.	Title	Music	Length
1.	"Blossom (Original Mix)"	Yasuhiko Hoshino	4:04
2.	"Moon (Original Mix)"	Hoshino	5:44
3.	"Don't Look Back (Reggae Disco Rockers Remix)"	Yuta Nakano	4:39
4.	"Meaning of Love (Acoustic Piano Version)"	Tetsuya Yukumi	5:19
5.	"Blossom (Original Mix - Instrumental)"	Hoshino	4:04
6.	"Moon (Original Mix - Instrumental)"	Hoshino	5:44

CD+DVD Version - CD (AVCD-31890)
No.	Title	Music	Length
1.	"Moon (Original Mix)"	Yasuhiko Hoshino	5:47
2.	"Blossom (Original Mix)"	Hoshino	4:07
3.	"Microphone (The Lowbrows Remix)"	Yuta Nakano	3:48
4.	"Moon (Original Mix - Instrumental)"	Hoshino	5:47
5.	"Blossom (Original Mix - Instrumental)"	Hoshino	4:07

CD+DVD Version - DVD (AVCD-31890B)
No.	Title	Length
1.	"Moon" (Video Clip)	5:55
2.	"Moon" (Making Clip)	3:55

== Charts ==
=== Oricon Sales Chart ===
Release	Chart	Peak position	Debut sales	Sales total	Chart run
July 14, 2010	Oricon Daily Singles Chart	1	33,974		
July 14, 2010	Oricon Weekly Singles Chart	1	70,568	96,490	13 weeks
July 14, 2010	Oricon Monthly Singles Chart	6	87,558		
July 14, 2010	Oricon Yearly Singles Chart	70			
