= Dream On (Naoya Urata song) =

2010 single by Naoya Urata featuring Ayumi Hamasaki

Single by Naoya Urata featuring Ayumi Hamasaki
- Released: December 22, 2010
- Recorded: 2010
- Genre: J-pop, hip hop, dance-pop
- Label: Avex Trax
- Composer(s): Kazuhiro Hara
- Lyricist(s): Ayumi Hamasaki
- Producer(s): Ayumi Hamasaki

Ayumi Hamasaki singles chronology
"L" (2010)	"Dream On" (2010)	"How Beautiful You Are" (2012)

Music video
- "Dream On" on YouTube

"Dream On" is a song recorded by Japanese singer Naoya Urata of the band AAA. It features vocals from the singer-songwriter Ayumi Hamasaki. The song was released as a single on December 22, 2010. The song is Hamasaki's first collaboration since 2001's "A Song is Born" (with Keiko). Moreover, this is Hamasaki's 26th consecutive song to reach number 1 and 39th number-one single overall.

== Track listing ==
All lyrics are written by Ayumi Hamasaki; all music is composed by Kazuhiro Hara

CD
No.	Title	Arranger(s)	Length
1.	"Dream On (Original Mix)"	CMJK	4:50
2.	"Dream On (Broken Haze Remix)"	Broken Haze (remix)	4:28
3.	"Dream On (Original Mix Instrumental)"	CMJK	4:48

The Broken Haze remix is not included on the CD+DVD version.

DVD
No.	Title	Length
1.	"Dream On" (Video Clip)
2.	"Dream On" (Making Clip)

== Charts ==
Chart	Peak position
Oricon Daily singles	1
Oricon Weekly singles	1
