= L (Ayumi Hamasaki EP) =

Single by Ayumi Hamasaki

from the album Love Songs
- A-side: "Virgin Road"; "Sweet Season"; "Last Angel"
- B-side: "Crossroad"; "Seven Days War"; (from "Crossroad")
- Released: September 29, 2010
- Label: Avex Trax
- Songwriter: Ayumi Hamasaki
- Producer: Max Matsuura

Ayumi Hamasaki singles chronology
"Crossroad" (2010)	"L" (2010)	"Dream On" (2010)

Official music video
- "Virgin Road" on YouTube

Official music video
- "Sweet Season" on YouTube

Official music video
- "Last Angel" on YouTube

L is the 50th single (51st overall) by Japanese singer-songwriter Ayumi Hamasaki, released on 29 September 2010. It is Hamasaki's last release from the three-part project to celebrate fifty singles. Its title, L, is the Roman numeral for fifty. All of the songs from the single EP were recorded in Los Angeles.

The single reached number 1, her 38th overall and 25th consecutive overall since "Free & Easy" on April 24, 2002. "L" has received an album certification for more than 100,000 copies shipped by the RIAJ, and the song "Virgin Road" has received a gold digital certification for paid downloads to cellphones.

== Music videos ==
The videos for "Sweet Season" and "Virgin Road" premiered September 27, 2010.

The music video for "Sweet Season" starts with Hamasaki picking up her kids with her car, and driving back home. It shows Hamasaki and her kids having fun at the swimming pool outside their house. Near the end of the video, Hamasaki falls in the swimming pool slowly, with flashbacks of her and her kids. Then, she wakes up at the same place on her sofa, realizing that it was only a dream. She is dressed differently from before, changing from a sweet-looking mother into a weird-looking woman, with heavy makeup. The second version of the video features new scenes of Hamasaki and her children in the living room singing, and scenes could be seen rewound. This version was not part of her Love Songs's music videos.

The music video for "Virgin Road" features Austrian actor and model Manuel Schwarz (later to become Hamasaki's real-life husband). "Virgin Road" was Hamasaki's fifth-most expensive music video, behind "Jewel", "Green", "Fairyland" and "My Name's Women". The video's production reportedly cost $1,000,000. The music video was shot in Los Angeles and features Hamasaki and Schwarz getting married. After that, they are seen robbing a bank and gas station. The video represents was Hamasaki's first encounter with large guns. A police chase ensues, and Hamasaki throws the stolen money out of the car. Resting somewhere on the hill, helicopter throw grenades at the couple, but they escape.

== Overview ==
Hamasaki's 25th consecutive single breaks the record for the most consecutive number 1 singles by any female artist as well as any soloist since Seiko Matsuda in the 1980s; Matsuda's streak of 24 consecutive number-one singles was broken in 1989 when "Precious Heart" reached number 2, only lagging behind "Gravity of Love" by Tetsuya Komuro, who is also a major contributor to Hamasaki's 49th ("Crossroad") and 50th singles.

== Track listing ==
All lyrics written by Ayumi Hamasaki, except for "Seven Days War", which is a cover version of TM Network's song written by Mitsuko Komuro.

=== Jacket A ===
Disc1: CD
No.	Title	Music	Arranger(s)	Length
1.	"Virgin Road (Original Mix)" (Used for a Music.jp television commercial)	Tetsuya Komuro	Yuta Nakano (Strings arrangement)	5:55
2.	"Sweet Season (Original Mix)" (Used for a Sweet magazine television commercial)	Noriyuki Makihara	Shingo Kobayashi	5:05
3.	"Last Angel (Original Mix)"	Komuro	CMJK	5:44
4.	"Virgin Road (Original Mix - Instrumental)"	Komuro	Nakano (Strings arrangement)	5:54
5.	"Sweet Season (Original Mix - Instrumental)"	Makihara	Kobayashi	5:05
6.	"Last Angel (Original Mix - Instrumental)"	Komuro	CMJK	5:41

Disc2: DVD
No.	Title	Length
1.	"Virgin Road" (Video Clip)	5:52
2.	"Sweet Season" (Video Clip)	5:22
3.	"Virgin Road" (Making Clip)	7:06
Total length:		33:24

=== Jacket B ===
Disc1: CD
No.	Title	Music	Arranger(s)	Length
1.	"Sweet Season (Original Mix)" (Used for a Sweet magazine television commercial)	Makihara	Kobayashi	5:04
2.	"Virgin Road (Original Mix)" (Used for a Music.jp television commercial)	Komuro	Nakano (Strings arrangement)	5:55
3.	"Last Angel (Original Mix)"	Komuro	CMJK	5:44
4.	"Sweet Season (Original Mix - Instrumental)"	Makihara	Kobayashi	5:04
5.	"Virgin Road (Original Mix - Instrumental)"	Komuro	Nakano (Strings arrangement)	5:54
6.	"Last Angel (Original Mix - Instrumental)"	Komuro	CMJK	5:41

Disc2: DVD
No.	Title	Length
1.	"Sweet Season" (Video Clip)	5:22
2.	"Virgin Road" (Video Clip)	5:52
3.	"Sweet Season" (Making Clip)	4:19
Total length:		33:22

=== Jacket C ===
CD-Only
No.	Title	Music	Arranger(s)	Length
1.	"Last Angel (Original Mix)"	Tetsuya Komuro	CMJK	5:43
2.	"Virgin Road (Original Mix)" (Used for a Music.jp television commercial)	Komuro	Nakano (Strings arrangement)	5:55
3.	"Sweet Season (Original Mix)" (Used for a Sweet magazine television commercial)	Makihara	Kobayashi	5:05
4.	"Crossroad (Orchestra Version)"	Komuro	Nakano	5:42
5.	"Seven Days War (Orchestra Version)"	Komuro	Nakano	5:27
6.	"Last Angel (Original Mix - Instrumental)"	Komuro	CMJK	5:43
7.	"Virgin Road (Original Mix - Instrumental)"	Komuro	Nakano (Strings arrangement)	5:54
8.	"Sweet Season (Original Mix - Instrumental)"	Makihara	Kobayashi	5:02
Total length:				44:31

=== Jacket D ===
CD-Only
No.	Title	Music	Arranger(s)	Length
1.	"Seven Days War (TK Acoustic Piano Version)"	Tetsuya Komuro	Komuro	5:17
2.	"Virgin Road (Original Mix)" (Used for a Music.jp television commercial)	Komuro	Nakano (Strings arrangement)	5:55
3.	"Sweet Season (Original Mix)" (Used for a Sweet magazine television commercial)	Makihara	Kobayashi	5:05
4.	"Last Angel (Original Mix)"	Komuro	CMJK	5:44
5.	"Virgin Road (Original Mix - Instrumental)"	Komuro	Nakano (Strings arrangement)	5:54
6.	"Sweet Season (Original Mix - Instrumental)"	Makihara	Kobayashi	5:05
7.	"Last Angel (Original Mix - Instrumental)"	Komuro	CMJK	5:41
Total length:				38:41

== Charts ==
=== Oricon Sales Chart ===
Release	Chart	Peak position	Debut sales	Sales total	Chart run
September 29, 2010	Oricon Daily Singles Chart	1	34,796		
September 29, 2010	Oricon Weekly Singles Chart	1	70,715	94,573	8 weeks
September 29, 2010	Oricon Monthly Singles Chart	6	92,478		
September 29, 2010	Oricon Yearly Singles Chart	71			
