= Max Matsuura =

Japanese record producer and entrepreneur

- Born: 松浦 勝人 (Matsuura Masato); October 1, 1964 (age 61); Yokohama, Japan
- Genres: J-pop; Eurobeat; dance
- Occupations: Record producer; entrepreneur
- Years active: 1988–present
- Label: Avex
- Website: max.syncl.jp

Masato Matsuura (松浦 勝人, Matsu'ura Masato; born October 1, 1964 in Yokohama, Japan), better known by his stage name Max Matsuura (松浦 マックス, Matsu'ura Makkusu), is a Japanese record producer and entrepreneur. He is the founder and chairman of Avex Group, one of the largest music labels. He is known mainly for discovering and developing new artists into stars (most notably Ayumi Hamasaki), as well as for reviving Ami Suzuki's career after she was dismissed by her previous record label.

== Radio program ==
His weekly radio program, Max Matsuura Work, Work, Play for Fun! (max matsuura 仕事が遊びで遊びが仕事), started on September 5, 2009, and it is broadcast every Sunday, 1:00–1:30 am, on Nippon Broadcasting System.

== Controversies ==
In 2004, Matsuura was the subject of some controversy when he considered leaving Avex Music Group due to a feud with Tom Yoda. Many artists, including Ayumi Hamasaki, said that they would also move in the event that he did so. Thus, stocks for Avex Trax plunged and Yoda ended up resigning, ending the feud.

In March 2009, Matsuura helped Tetsuya Komuro in the latter's fraud case. Matsuura paid the plaintiff ¥648,000,000 (¥500,000,000 for the exact amount, ¥100,000,000 for compensations and ¥48,000,000 for delay damages).

On July 17, 2011, Matsuura closed his Twitter account due to an intense feud with fans of K-pop group JYJ.

== Personal life ==
Matsuura lives in Denenchofu, Tokyo.

== See also ==
- $4.50 Theater Company
