= List of Oricon number-one singles of 2001 =

The following is a list of Oricon number-one singles of 2001.

== Oricon Weekly Singles Chart ==
Issue date	Song	Artist(s)	Ref.
January 1	"M"	Ayumi Hamasaki	
January 8	"M"	Ayumi Hamasaki	
January 15	"Fragile"	Every Little Thing	
January 22	"Fragile"	Every Little Thing	
January 29	"Minimoni. Jankenpyon!"	Minimoni	
February 5	"Minimoni. Jankenpyon!"	Minimoni	
February 12	"Evolution"	Ayumi Hamasuki	
February 19	"Boku no Senaka ni wa Hane ga Aru"	KinKi Kids	
February 26	"Can You Keep a Secret?"	Hikaru Utada	
March 5	"Can You Keep a Secret?"	Hikaru Utada	
March 12	"Baby! Koi ni Knock Out!"	Petitmoni	
March 19	"Never Ever"	Ayumi Hamasaki	
March 26	"ultra soul"	B'z	
April 2	"ultra soul"	B'z	
April 9	"Ai no bakayaro"	Maki Goto	
April 16	"Ashita ga arusa"	Re:Japan	
April 23	"Pieces of a Dream"	Chemistry	
April 30	"Kimi no tame ni boku ga iru"	Arashi	
May 7	"Global Communications"	Glay	
May 14	"Zero Landmine"	NML	
May 21	"Zero Landmine"	NML	
May 28	"Endless sorrow"	Ayumi Hamasaki	
June 4	"Jonetsu"	KinKi Kids	
June 11	"Message"	Tokio	
June 18	"Point of No Return"	Chemistry	
June 25	"Point of No Return"	Chemistry	
July 2	"Lifetime Respect"	Dōzan Miki	
July 9	"Agehachō"	Porno Graffitti	
July 16	"Naminori Jonny"	Keisuke Kuwata	
July 23	"UNITE!"	Ayumi Hamasaki	
July 30	"Naminori Jonny"	Keisuke Kuwata	
August 6	"The Peace!"	Morning Musume	
August 13	"Jidai"	Arashi	
August 20	"Gold"	B'z	
August 27	"Gold"	B'z	
September 3	"Yasashii uta"	Mr. Children	
September 10	"Dasenai tegami"	V6	
September 17	"Spirit dreams inside"	L'Arc-en-Ciel	
September 24	"Mini-Moni Telephone! Rin Rin Rin"	Minimoni	
October 1	"Hitohirano jiyu"	Glay	
October 8	"Dearest"	Ayumi Hamasaki	
October 15	"Dearest"	Ayumi Hamasaki	
October 22	"you go your way"	Chemistry	
October 29	"evergreen"	Hyde	
November 5	"Shiroi koibitotachi"	Keisuke Kuwata	
November 12	"Mr. Moonlight (Ai no Big Band)"	Morning Musume	
November 19	"Youthful Days"	Mr. Children	
November 26	"Hey! Minna genki kai?"	KinKi Kids	
December 3	"Ōjisama to yuki no yoru"	Tanpopo	
December 10	"Traveling"	Hikaru Utada	
December 17	"Traveling"	Hikaru Utada	
December 24	"A Song is Born"	Ayumi Hamasaki and Keiko	
December 31	"Always (A Song For Love)"	J Friends	
