= Daybreak (Ayumi Hamasaki song) =

Single by Ayumi Hamasaki

from the album I Am...
- Released: March 6, 2002
- Genre: J-pop; pop rock; alternative; (Album version); Trip hop, dark ambient (Hal"s Mix 2002)
- Length: 58:02
- Label: Avex Trax
- Songwriters: Ayumi Hamasaki (lyrics); CREA + DAI + junichi matsuda (music)

Ayumi Hamasaki singles chronology
"A Song Is Born" (2001)	"Daybreak" (2002)	"Free & Easy" (2002)

Official Music Video
- "Daybreak" on YouTube

"Daybreak" is a song recorded by Japanese recording artist and lyricist Ayumi Hamasaki, released on March 6, 2002 as the eighth and final single on her fourth studio album I Am.... Influenced by the then-recent September 11 attacks in New York City and Washington D.C. in North America, Hamasaki sought a new inspiration for her then-forthcoming album; instead of writing songs about confusion, loneliness and love like her previous efforts, she was encouraged to engage in more peaceful and worldly themes. This resulted in several songs on I Am..., including "Daybreak".

Musically, there are two versions; the album version which is influenced by pop rock and Americanized alternative rock music, while the single version utilizes synthpop, trip hop and dark ambient music. The lyrical content talks about achievement and self-empowerment. Upon the release, "Daybreak" received mixed to favorable reviews from most music critics, who had praised Hamasaki's vocal abilities and likened the production, while critics were divided with the single version and lack of innovation. An accompanying music video was shot by Wataru Takeishi for the single version, which featured Hamasaki walking on deserted highway in early hours off the morning.

Commercially, "Daybreak" had fair charting response in her native Japan. The song debuted at number two on both Daily and Weekly Oricon chart, becoming her first single to miss the top spot since "Audience". Although certified gold by the Recording Industry Association of Japan (RIAJ), it remained her last single to not peak at number one for over a decade until it was surpassed by her 2013 recording "Feel the Love/Merry-Go-Round" at number five. That was also surpassed by the following single "Terminal".

== Background ==
On New Year's Day 2002, Hamasaki had released her fourth studio album I am.... During the album process, Hamasaki had learnt about the breaking news off the September 11 attacks in 2001, that had hit New York City and the Washington, D.C., metropolitan area. The attack itself had killed 2,507 civilians, 72 law enforcement officers, 343 firefighters, and 55 military personnel and caused at least $10 billion in property and infrastructure damage. Because off this, Hamasaki had sought a new inspiration for her then-forthcoming album; instead of writing songs about confusion, loneliness and love like her previous efforts, she was encouraged to engage in more peaceful and worldly themes. The response was positively received from the Japanese audience and became successful in her native Japan, selling over 2.3 million units in Japan and was certified triple million by the Recording Industry Association of Japan (RIAJ) for shipments of three million copies.

The album's singles were very successful. The lead single "M" became Hamasaki's fourth million-selling single. (Note: "M" received a 3× Platinum certification for 1,200,000 copies, however the 3× Platinum threshold was redefined as 750,000 copies in 2003.) After the successful feat, the following singles "Evolution", "Never Ever", "Endless Sorrow", "Unite!" and "Dearest" had all sold over 500,000 copies in Japan, becoming her first and only studio album to contain all over 500,000 selling official singles. After the success off the singles, Hamasaki begun work on her studio album Rainbow and had geared up to promote it with "Free & Easy", so Hamasaki released the album's final single and only limited edition single "Daybreak".

== Composition and release ==
"Daybreak" was written by Hamasaki herself, like the rest off the I Am... album and produced by long-time collaborator Max Matsuura. There are two official versions; the album version and the single version. The album version was composed by Hamasaki, Dai "D.A.I." Nagao and additional production by Junichi Matsuda, while the song was arranged and mixed by Tasuku. "Daybreak" was out off twelve songs composed by Hamasaki, which I Am... also became her first studio album to assert full creative control over; this song was her only collaboration with Matsuda on the album. The album version contains less instrumentation that the single edit and focuses on simple guitar and drum instruments. A pop rock and alternative rock song that resembles Western music elements, the song was noted as being "darker" and "harder" than the single version. Jeff from Random.Access Music commented that the production and composition off the music was similar to "generic North American pop-punk-rock band [...]"

Regarding the single version, the song was composed and remixed by HAL. Yolanda from Music Addiction observed that "They took the original song [Daybreak], threw out the electric guitar (in fact they deleted all the rock elements) and made it a steady synthpop song. "Daybreak" was released as the eighth and final single from I am... and the only limited edition single on March 6, 2002. Linited to only 300,000 copies, the song was released as a compact disc by Avex Trax and featured ten tracks. For the cover artwork, the sleeve was shot by Shinichi Hara, art design was handled by Shigeru Kasai and was officially directed by Yasuyuki Tomita. "Daybreak" became her last single to feature more than eight songs of remixes or instrumentals, with her 2003 single "No Way to Say" having four orchestral, one instrumental and one remix and her 2008 single "Rule/Sparkle" having two remixes and two instrumentals.

== Reception ==
"Daybreak" received mixed to favorable reviews from most music critics. Jeff from Random.Access was mixed in his review for "Daybreak", commenting that the song resembled "generic North American pop-punk-rock bands [...]" by exampling My Chemical Romance. He did, however fell that her "more feminine vocals" shine through. Yolanda from the online publication Music Addiction awarded the CD three star out of five. Despite being more satisfied with the album version, she said "'HΛL's Mix 2002' is another good creation from HΛL's team, although most of their remixes are a hit or miss [...] I like it, but the album version is more my thing." She was critical on the remixes and concluded " I must say it wasn't her best, but also not her worst. [...] It was kinda weird though that the original version of this single's A-side wasn't even featured here, the rock version of Daybreak on the album remains the very best version." Hamasaki had hosted an online voting poll for fans to choose their favorite tracks to be featured on her Ayumi Hamasaki 15th Anniversary Tour ~Best Live Tour~. As a result, "Daybreak" was added to the set-list off the tour.

Commercially, the song performed fairly well on Oricon. The song debuted at number two on the Oricon Daily Chart, which caused concern that the single would not top the weekly performance. In its first charting week, "Daybreak" debuted at number two on the Oricon Weekly Chart with over 113,000 copies sold. This became her first single since "Audience" in 2000 to have stalled at the second position. The song stayed in the chart for nine weeks, and was placed at number fifty-seven on the Oricon Yearly Chart. The song was certified Gold by the Recording Industry Association of Japan (RIAJ) for shipments off 100,000 units.

"Daybreak" became Hamasaki's final single to have missed the top position on Oricon for almost eleven years until this record was surpassed by her 2013 single "Feel the Love/Merry-Go-Round", which peaked at number five on the Oricon Weekly Chart, failed to receive a certification and became Hamasaki's lowest charting single on that date. This record was then surpassed by her second single "Terminal" in 2014, where it peaked at number twenty-four, her first ever single to have peaked outside the top ten and twenty since her debut single "Poker Face", sixteen years later.

== Promotion ==
The music video premiered in Japan on February 6, 2002. The music video used the remix of Hal's 2002 Version. The video, which was directed by Wataru Takeishi features Hamasaki on a deserted highway in the early morning. She is wearing heavy makeup and a torn white dress. At the end of the video she begins to walk away from the camera.

The "Hal's mix" of Daybreak was used in commercials for the Lumix camera of Panasonic. Hamasaki appeared in the advert video.

== Track listing ==
1. "Daybreak" (Hal's Mix 2002)
2. "No More Words" (Brent Mini'S Rotary Mix)
3. "I Am..." (Night Clubbers mix)
4. "No More Words" (Nicely Nice remix)
5. "I Am..." (Ram's Special 11Days Mix)
6. "No More Words" (Turn Up the Break mix)
7. "I Am..." (Huge Fairy Tale mix)
8. "No More Words" (Laugh & Peace Mix)
9. "Daybreak" (Hal's Mix 2002) (Instrumental)
10. "Opening Run" (CMJK's extended mix)

== Charts, peaks and positions ==
=== Oricon positions ===
Chart (2000)	Peak position
Oricon Daily Chart	2
Oricon Weekly Chart	2
Oricon Yearly Chart	57

=== Sales and certifications ===
Region	First Week	Certification	Shipments
Japan (RIAJ)	113,170	Gold	200,000
