= A Best 2 =

- Black cover art

Greatest hits album by Ayumi Hamasaki
- Released: 28 February 2007
- Recorded: 2001–2006
- Genre: J-pop
- Length: 77:27 (Black); 74:56 (White)
- Label: Avex Trax
- Producer: Max Matsuura

Ayumi Hamasaki chronology
Secret (2006)	A Best 2 (2007)	Guilty (2008)

A Best 2: White
- White cover art

Best 2 is a two-part greatest hits album by Japanese singer Ayumi Hamasaki. Both albums, titled Black and White, were released on 28 February 2007 on various formats by Avex Trax. Produced by Max Matsuura, they follow Hamasaki's compilation album A Best, which was released in March 2001. A Best 2 are concept albums, with Black focusing on darker and more serious tones and White on lighter and more upbeat themes. The albums contain 31 songs, including an unreleased track titled "Part of Me" on the Black edition, that were released between the periods of her albums I Am... (2002) and (Miss)understood (2006).

Music critics praised A Best 2 for its themes and Hamasaki's music catalogue. The albums were commercially successful in Japan. White debuted at number one on the Oricon Albums Chart, while Black stalled at second place. Both records were among the best-selling albums of the year, and were certified triple platinum by the Recording Industry Association of Japan (RIAJ) for shipments of 750,000 units. There were no singles from the album, but "Part of Me" was certified gold by RIAJ for exceeding 100,000 ringtone downloads. To promote the albums, Hamasaki went on three different concert tours across Asia and received additional live DVD releases.

== Background and content ==
In January 2007, Hamasaki announced on her website that she planned to release two greatest hits albums, titled A Best 2 (individually referenced as Black and White). Both Black and White are direct follow-ups to Hamasaki's compilation album A Best, which debuted in March 2001 to immense commercial success. It is also Hamasaki's third and fourth compilation album, released four years after her ballad-inspired collection A Ballads (2003). On 17 January, Hamasaki published additional information about both albums, including the album's content, formats, and promotional activities.

A Best 2 are concept albums, with Black focusing on darker and more serious tones and White on lighter and more upbeat themes. Black and White features 31 songs from Hamasaki's single releases between her albums I Am... (2002) and (Miss)understood (2005). They both include tracks that were not released as singles; Black includes "Walking Proud," "About You," and a new recording called "Part of Me," while White features "Humming 7/4" and "My Name's Woman." Additionally, the song "Memorial Address" was added as a hidden track to Black.

== Release ==
A Best 2 was released on various formats on 28 February 2007 by Avex Trax. The standard release of both Black and White comes in a jewel case that includes separate content. Each album's double-DVD version comes in a double packaging that includes the CD, music videos and visuals from each album, as well as a live DVD from Hamasaki's Best Countdown show, which features different performances. In Indonesia, A Best 2 was distributed on cassette tape. Avex Trax later released both A Best 2 albums in CD and DVD formats across Asia, including Hong Kong, Taiwan, and China.

== Reception ==
Professional ratings
Review scores
Source	Rating
CDJournal	(positive)
CDJournal	(positive)

A Best 2 received positive feedback from the Japanese music publication CDJournal, which reviewed each album individually. The review praised Black for featuring "dramatic" ballads in the first half and primarily rock music in the second half. The publication also highlighted "Heaven" and "Part of Me" for concluding the album with "expressive" vocals from Hamasaki. The second review for White praised songs like "Evolution" and "Grateful Days" for being a "positive" aspect to the record, as well as how well the album complement Black.

A Best 2 achieved commercial success in Japan. White debuted at the top of the Oricon Daily and Weekly Album Chart, selling 475,284 copies in its first week, while Black debuted and stalled at number two, selling 470,057 units. Hamasaki became the first female artist in 37 years to occupy both top positions, a record previously held by Japanese enka singer Keiko Fuji. By the end of 207, both albums were high-sellers: White finished fifth on the Oricon Year-end Chart with 717,501 units sold, while Black came in seventh with 698,591 copies. The Recording Industry Association of Japan (RIAJ) certified both albums triple platinum for exceeding 750,000 units. In February 2009, Avex Trax announced in their financial report that A Best 2 had sold two million combined shipments across the country.

== Promotion ==
Although no singles were released from the album, the track "Part of Me" received a music video, which was included on the album's DVD formats. The song was featured in Panasonic commercials promoting the Lumix FX30 digital camera, which was distributed in Japan. The song was also certified gold by the Recording Industry Association of Japan (RIAJ) for exceeding 100,000 ringtone downloads.

Hamasaki went on three different concert tours to promote A Best 2. Her first tour was the annual Best Countdown show, which took her through Japan. The live release was divided between the DVD version of Black and White. The second was her Secret Tour, which also promoted her studio album Secret (2006). The tour, which began on 10 March 2007, and ended in mid-June of that year, took her throughout Japan, including her first appearances in Taiwan and China. Asia Tour 2007: Tour of Secret, a live DVD, was released on 12 March 2008. Her final tour was her second Best Countdown show, which was recorded live and released on 18 June 2008.

== Track listing ==
A Best: Black tracklist
No.	Title	Original album	Length
1.	"Dearest"	I am...
2.	"Carols"	My Story
3.	"No Way to Say"	Memorial Address
4.	"Hanabi (Fireworks)"	Rainbow
5.	"Walking Proud"	My Story
6.	"Free & Easy"	Rainbow
7.	"Endless Sorrow"	I am...
8.	"Because of You"	Memorial Address
9.	"About You"	My Story
10.	"Game"	My Story
11.	"Is This Love?"	(Miss)understood
12.	"Hanabi: Episode II (Fireworks: Episode II)"	Memorial Address
13.	"Never Ever"	I am...
14.	"Heaven"	(Miss)understood
15.	"Part of Me"	previously unreleased
16.	"Memorial Address: Take 2 version" (Hidden Track)	Memorial Address

A Best: White tracklist
No.	Title	Original album	Length
1.	"Evolution"	I am...
2.	"Greatful Days*"	Memorial Address
3.	"Independent"	Rainbow
4.	"Humming 7/4"	My Story
5.	"Unite!"	I am...
6.	"Real Me"	Rainbow
7.	"My Name's Women"	My Story
8.	"Ourselves"	Memorial Address
9.	"Inspire"	My Story
10.	"Step You**"	(Miss)understood
11.	"July 1st"	Rainbow
12.	"Fairyland"	(Miss)understood
13.	"Voyage"	Rainbow
14.	"Moments"	My Story
15.	"A Song Is Born"	I am...

A Best: Black DVD content
No.	Title	Notes	Length
1.	"Dearest"
2.	"Carols"
3.	"No Way to Say"
4.	"Walking Proud"
5.	"Free & Easy"
6.	"Endless Sorrow"
7.	"Because of You"
8.	"About You"
9.	"Game"
10.	"Is This Love?"
11.	"Hanabi: Episode II (Fireworks: Episode II)"
12.	"Never Ever" (Promotional video)
13.	"Heaven"
14.	"Part of Me"
15.	"H"
16.	Untitled	Promotional video

A Best: White DVD content
No.	Title	Notes	Length
1.	"Evolution"
2.	"Greatful Days"
3.	"Humming 7/4"
4.	"Unite!"	Promotional video
5.	"Real Me"
6.	"My Name's Women"
7.	"Ourselves"
8.	"Inspire"
9.	"Step You"
10.	"Fairyland"
11.	"Voyage"
12.	"Moments"
13.	"H"	Promotional video

A Best: Black: Best of CountDown Live 2006–2007
No.	Title	Length
1.	"Best of CountDown Live 2006–2007 (Behind the Scenes)"

A Best: White: Best of CountDown Live 2006–2007
No.	Title	Length
1.	"Not Yet"
2.	"Ourselves"
3.	"Fly High"
4.	"Beautiful Fighters"
5.	"Never End"
6.	"A Song for xx"
7.	"No Way to Say"
8.	"Free & Easy"
9.	"Evolution"
10.	"Flower Garden"
11.	"Until That Day..."
12.	"Audience"
13.	"Boys & Girls"
14.	"Trauma"
15.	"Independent"
16.	"Humming 7/4"
17.	"Blue Bird"

== Charts ==
=== Weekly chart ===
Chart (2007: Black)	Peak position
Japanese Albums (Oricon)	2
Taiwanese Albums (G-Music) (Note: Week references for G-Music: Black and White during week 10 and week 11, 2007.)	3

Chart (2007: White)	Peak position
Japanese Albums (Oricon)	1
Taiwanese Albums (G-Music)	3

=== Yearly chart ===
Chart (2007: Black)	Position
Japanese Albums (Oricon)	7

Chart (2007: White)	Position
Japanese Albums (Oricon)	5

== Certification and sales ==
Region	Certification	Certified units/sales
Japan (RIAJ)	3× Platinum	702,895
Japan (RIAJ)	3× Platinum	721,839

== Release history ==
Region	Date	Format(s)	Label	Ref.
Japan	28 February 2007	CD; DVD	Avex Trax	
Hong Kong	9 March 2007	CD; DVD	Avex Trax	
Taiwan	9 March 2007	CD; DVD	Avex Trax	
China	2007	CD; DVD	Avex Trax	
Indonesia	2007	Cassette tape	Avex Trax	
Various	2007	Digital download; streaming	Avex Trax	

== See also ==
- List of Oricon number-one albums of 2007
