= Dearest (Ayumi Hamasaki song) =

2001 single by Ayumi Hamasaki

Single by Ayumi Hamasaki

from the album I Am...
- Released: September 27, 2001
- Genre: Pop
- Length: 59:27
- Label: Avex Trax
- Songwriters: Ayumi Hamasaki (lyrics); CREA + DAI (music)
- Producer: Max Matsuura

Ayumi Hamasaki singles chronology
"Unite!" (2001)	"Dearest" (2001)	"A Song Is Born" (2002)

Official Music Video
- "Dearest" on YouTube

Acoustic Piano Video
- "Dearest (Acoustic Piano version)" on YouTube

"Dearest" is a song by Japanese recording artist Ayumi Hamasaki, taken from her fourth studio album I Am.... It was released as her 24th single on September 27, 2001. The single was also released at the same time as the remix albums Super Eurobeat Presents Ayu-ro Mix 2 and Cyber Trance Presents Ayu Trance. The song was written and co-composed by Hamasaki (under the alias Crea), alongside composer Dai Nagao, and produced by businessman Max Matsuura. "Dearest" is an impassioned torch song with lyrics that carry themes of love, loss, and the longing for eternal happiness.

Critics viewed "Dearest" as a standout track from I Am... and complimented Hamasaki's lyrics and vocal delivery. It also achieved success in Japan, peaking at number one on the Oricon Singles Chart and on the TBS Count Down TV chart. It has amassed cumulative sales of 750,000 and is listed as one of her best-selling singles. The song's critical and commercial success won it the grand prix at the 43rd Japan Record Awards and the 34th Japan Cable Awards.

The accompanying music video for "Dearest" was directed by Wataru Takeishi, and is a symbolic representation of how Hamasaki thought Avex viewed her as a product at the time. The song was used in TV commercials of Japanese mobile company Tu-Ka, and also as the third ending theme of the YTV anime InuYasha. Both the music video and the song has appeared on several compilations by Hamasaki, including A Ballads, A Best 2 (2007) and A Complete: All Singles (2008). For additional promotion, the title track was performed at several concert tours by Hamasaki.

== Background and composition ==
"Dearest"
A sample of "Dearest", a power ballad that conveys themes of love, nostalgia, and perseverance.

Similar to all of her previous singles released since "M," "Dearest" was composed by Hamasaki herself under her pen name CREA; on this occasion along with Dai Nagao, and it was arranged by Naoto Suzuki, whom she first worked on her 8th single "To Be" released in 1999 and arranged many of her hit songs, the most recent being—by the time of this release—the million-selling single "Seasons." This song was the only track arranged by Suzuki to be included in Hamasaki's 4th album, I Am....

Musically, "Dearest" is a power ballad with a "gentle" piano melody, "lush" orchestration, and an "emotional" vocal delivery. The song is written in the key of A major and features chords such as F-sharp minor, D major, and E major, with a common time tempo of 125 beats per minute. Its instrumentations includes piano, strings, acoustic guitars, and drums. The song's structure emphasizes gradual build-ups. Lyrically, the song reflects on cherishing precious memories, even in the face of life's harsh realities. Its CD single release includes various remixed versions, including an Acoustic Piano Version, which further highlights its delicate composition.

== Reception ==
The song "Dearest" received positive reviews from most music critics. A reviewer from CD Journal described the song's melody as "heart-tugging" and its lyrics as "persuasive" in its parent album's review. Toshiaki Hayato of Amazon praised "Dearest" as a "romantic" piano ballad during his review of I Am.... Michael McCarthy commented that "Dearest" and the rest of the ballads from I Am... have "intense" emotional delivery and never get "generic." The critical success of the song helped it win the grand prix at the 34th Japan Cable Radio Awards and the 43rd Japan Record Awards. This was the first time that an anime theme song had won the grand prix since "Odoru Pompokolin."

Commercially, "Dearest" was a major commercial success. It debuted at number one on the Oricon Singles Chart with 363,730 copies sold in its first week. The single stayed on top of the chart for two consecutive weeks, selling 124,020 copies on its second charting week. It slid to number two on its third charting week with 81,270 copies sold, being knocked off by Chemistry's "You Go Your Way." It charted in the top 100 for seventeen weeks, selling a reported total of 750,420 copies, making it Hamasaki's tenth most popular single. "Dearest" ranked at seventeenth place on the year-end Oricon Singles Chart for 2001. The single also debuted at number one on Tokyo Broadcasting System's (TBS) Count Down TV chart during the chart week of October 6, 2001, her eleventh single to do so. It was placed at number seventeen on their Annual Count Down TV chart in 2001.

== Music video and promotion ==
A screenshot from the video.

The music video of "Dearest" was directed by Wataru Takeishi and filmed in the USA. It begins with Hamasaki in a lounge. In another room, businesspeople are at a table talking about her sales. The scene goes back to Hamasaki, where she reaches for her glass, but one of her servants takes it and hands it to her. The song begins while she is singing at a mirror. Then, Hamasaki and her bodyguards are walking and she changes into another outfit. They walk outside to her car and it's raining. Paparazzi are waiting and Hamasaki covers her face as the guards try to get rid of paparazzi. Hamasaki runs away from the paparazzi and guards and changes into a pink outfit. A little girl with blonde hair gives Hamasaki candy and everyone looks around and smiles at her. She is then chased by her guards into the store and she changes into a black outfit. One of the guards slip and the scene changes to one where Hamasaki is standing in a field in front of windmills. This scene was shot at the San Gorgonio Pass wind farm in Las Vegas. An alternative version of the video, featuring the Acoustic Piano Version of the song was also released. This time in the music video she is in the same field from the original version in front of the windmills.

Early in September 2001, "Dearest" became the ending theme for the anime Inuyasha from episodes 42–60. During that same month, "Dearest" became the Tu-Ka 2001 commercial song song. This song also marked her third appearance at the NHK Kōhaku Uta Gassen. In October 2023, 22 years after its premiere, the song was used as the Gem Castle Yukizaki commercial song.

== Track listing ==
1. "Dearest" – 5:33
2. "Dearest" (Depth Nostalgic Windmix)
3. "Never Ever" (Jonathan Peters Radio Mix)
4. "Dearest" (Energized Mix)
5. "Dearest" (Huge 20011002 mix)
6. "Endless Sorrow" (Hex Hector Main Radio Mix)
7. "Dearest" (Laugh & Peace Mix)
8. "Dearest" (Fresh energy Mix)
9. "M" (Johnny Vicious Radio Vox)
10. "Dearest" (Instrumental) – 5:33
11. "Dearest" (Acoustic Piano Version)

== Charts ==
=== Weekly charts ===
Chart (2001)	Peak position
Japan Singles (Oricon)	1
Japan Count Down TV Chart (TBS)	1

=== Monthly charts ===
Chart (2001)	Peak position
Japan Singles (Oricon)	1

=== Year-end charts ===
Chart (2001)	Position
Japan Singles (Oricon)	17
Japan Count Down TV Chart (TBS)	17
Taiwan (Yearly Singles Top 100)	64

=== Decade-end charts ===
Chart (2000–2009)	Position
Japan Singles (Oricon)	58

== Certifications ==
Region	Certification	Certified units/sales
Japan (RIAJ) Digital single	Gold	100,000^{*}
Japan (RIAJ) Physical sales	2× Platinum	750,420
^{*} Sales figures based on certification alone.

Preceded by "Tsunami" (Southern All Stars)	Japan Record Award Grand Prix; 2001	Succeeded by "Voyage" (Ayumi Hamasaki)
