= A Best =

- The cardboard sleeve cover used to hold the standard jewel case.

Greatest hits album by Ayumi Hamasaki
- Released: March 28, 2001
- Recorded: 1998–2000
- Studios: Prime Sound Studio (Tokyo); Nowdays Studio; Studio Sound Dali (Tokyo); Soundtrack New York (New York City)
- Genre: Pop
- Length: 76:01
- Label: Avex Trax
- Producer: Max Matsuura

Ayumi Hamasaki chronology
Duty (2000)	A Best (2001)	I Am... (2002)

Singles from A Best
- 1. "M" Released: December 13, 2000

A Best (stylized as BEST) is the first greatest hits album by Japanese singer-songwriter Ayumi Hamasaki. It was released on March 28, 2001, by Avex Trax and Avex Music Creative Inc. Hamasaki had originally planned to release a greatest hits album after her 2002 studio album I Am..., but this was declined by Avex head staff. Instead, Avex released the album in 2001, which caused conflict between the label and Hamasaki. The compilation was released in two different formats including a physical and a digital release. Seven different artworks were released in several editions of the album. The album includes one new track, three re-recorded tracks, and the all the rest of her previously released singles.

A Best was lauded by contemporary music critics who noted the quality and memorability of the tracks. Many also labeled the album as one of the best representations of Japanese pop music. Released purposely on the same day as fellow Japanese-American musician Hikaru Utada's studio album Distance for direct competition, the compilation entered at number two on Japan's Oricon Albums Chart. It reached number one the following week, and sold over five million units in Japan. The album's lead single "M" was released on December 13, 2000, and reached the top spot on the Oricon Singles Chart.

In support of A Best as well as her third studio album Duty (2000), Hamasaki held two concerts at the Tokyo Dome. Despite setbacks related to Hamasaki's health, the tour was a success, and a live recording was released on home video. Since its release, the album brought Hamasaki a myriad of accolades and award nominations, as well as successful recognition throughout Eastern and Western publications. A Best is listed as the sixth best-selling album in Japan overall. In 2016, Hamasaki re-released the album on that same date as a 15th-anniversary celebration; this included new material and formats. Hamasaki promoted the reissue with a Japanese concert tour, entitled Made in Japan.

== Background and material ==
"Those songs from back then still exist in tangible form, so if you want to listen, you can keep doing so, right? But hearing Ayu sing those old songs now—unless you go to a live show or you’re a really devoted fan—you don’t really get the chance. With a best-of album, though, it might become an opportunity for people who weren’t interested before to listen. That’s why I wanted to perform the old songs again with my current vocals."

— Hamasaki on why she re-recorded her earlier songs for A Best.

Hamasaki had originally planned to release her first greatest hits after a "couple more albums" when she released her 2002 studio album I Am.... However, in early 2001, Hamasaki's record label Avex Trax announced the plans for the release of a greatest hits package with an undisclosed date at the time. Avex had contacted Hamasaki one day, and stated that they intended to release the album on a specific date unbeknownst to her. Avex decided to purposely release the album against fellow Japanese recording artist Hikaru Utada's second studio album Distance on March 28, 2001, for direct competition of sales; Utada had previously sold over 9.91 million units of her debut album First Love (1999).

"When people hear the title A Best, it’s only natural to expect it would begin with “Poker Face.” But Ayu’s concept this time was to create a collection where every track feels instantly familiar to the listener. With songs like “Poker Face,” “You,” and “Trust” from her debut year, she was still experimenting and finding her footing. None of those early singles carried an absolute “must-include” weight—whichever one made the cut, the overall impression wouldn’t change much. So in the end, she chose “Trust” out of those three. That kind of thinking shaped the song selection across the whole album."

— Hamasaki on how she conducted the album's track list.

Hamasaki originally thought the statement was a "joke," but was against the overall idea. She felt that majority of her single material for the album was "insufficient" at the time. She said, "It was too early for release. My 'best album' was something I dreamt of doing my way, but one day the company came to me and said 'your best album has to be released on this month and on this day." The date announcement was a widely controversial topic throughout Japanese and Western media, which claimed the two singers were "rivals" on both personal and professional circumstances. Hamasaki denied the claims, but decided to take more control of her future material and asserted that she didn't want to be marketed as a "product" by Avex. At the time, Avex had forced her to release the compilation album, and Hamasaki herself sarcastically recalled in a 2004 interview on Super TV that “I felt I was an important product of Avex,” and that she was so disgusted with the idea that she even considered retirement.

The songs on A Best were selected by Hamasaki herself from the singles and albums released in the 20th century from 1998 to 2000, three years since her debut, and her 20th single “Evolution” and 21st single “Never Ever,” which were already released in 2001, are not included. Both songs were eventually included in her next compilation A Best 2 (2007). Also, among the singles released in the selected years, the songs “Poker Face,” “You,” “For My Dear...,” “Whatever,” “Love (Since 1999),” “Monochrome,” “Too Late," "Kanariya” and “Audience” were not included in the track list.

Knowing that the material was still insufficient, Hamasaki reluctantly re-recorded three tracks; "Trust," "Depend on You" and the non-single "A Song for ××." Hamasaki had to re-record the tracks whilst recording the material for I Am.... Although not stated, the vocals on “End Roll” were newly recorded and mixed with a new arrangement; on “Boys & Girls,” the vocals were the same as on the original song, but the arrangement was changed to be closer to the live version. Hamasaki also selected the non-single "Who..." to be included on the album; "Who..." excluded the hidden track "Kanariya," which appeared on Loveppears.

== Release ==
A Best was released on March 28, 2001 in two formats; a standard compact disc, and a digital download. Both the CD and digital download includes 16 tracks, with the physical editions housed in a cardboard sleeve. The cardboard sleeve of the album was photographed by Keita Haginiwa, whilst the booklet was designed by Shigeru Kasai from RICE. The black-and-white cover features a close-up shot of Hamasaki, with a tear falling down her face. Hamasaki stated in an interview that she chose for the album cover to be monochromatic because she wanted to make a simple piece that would never go out of style or feel out of date. Several publications commented on the cover's design, with many believing it was a visual response to the album's release and reports of her and Utada's rivalry. For each six albums released had six different artworks, each having different close-up poses by Hamasaki. A Best is Hamasaki's first album to embody her "" logo on the front of the cover.

== Critical responses ==
Professional ratings
Review scores
Source	Rating
MTVChinese.com	4/5 stars
Hot Express	(favorable)

A Best received positive reviews from music critics. Ray Katsushi from MTVChinese.com gave the album a positive analysis, emphasizing how Hamasaki’s success is not just about idol appeal, but about her artistry, lyrical resonance, and her ability to evolve musically while shaping youth culture. Tetsuo Hiraga of Hot Express was extremely positive on the album, highlighting how her music resonates beyond youth culture, touching anyone open to her message.

Hiromi Yonemoto from Yeah!! J-Pop! was positive in his review. Yonemoto commended the album's quality, and commented that the album was the "centerpiece" of Hamasaki's sales success, concluding that the material is "memorable." A staff reviewer for Tower Records commended the album's quality and felt that while the album featured more "heart" than her previous work. The reviewer called the album "familiar" and filled with "Ayu charm." Alexey Eremenko from AllMusic selected many tracks from the album as the album and Hamasaki's best moments in her career.

== Commercial performances ==
Before its release, Hamasaki commented that she was anxious about the album's first week sales. She commented that she felt it might "be my last album... It's possible I'll may never get the chance again". During a competitive week with Utada's album Distance, A Best debuted at number two on Japan's Oricon Albums Chart. This resulted in Distance debuting atop the album chart, making it Hamasaki's second album after her 1999 remix album Ayu-mi-x not to enter the top spot. Hamasaki's album sold 2,874,870 units in its first week of sales, whilst Utada's album sold 3,002,720 units in its first week. This made A Best the second fastest-selling album in Japanese music history, just behind Distance at first place. The following week, A Best replaced Distance at the top spot and sold 510,160 units. This became Hamasaki's first greatest hits album to reach the top spot on that chart, and her fourth album overall.

The album stayed inside the top ten for nine weeks, the top 100 for 20 weeks, and eventually lasted 51 weeks in the top 300 chart. By the end of 2001, A Best placed second on the Annual Japanese Oricon Albums Chart, behind Distance. Hamasaki's album had sold over 4.24 million units in Japan, whilst Utada's album sold 4.40 million. Hamasaki's album sales reached an excessive ¥12 billion (approximately $77,284,200 US dollars) by the end of the year, which hugely effected the stock prices of the record company. A Best was certified sixteen-times-platinum (adjusted to 4x Million by June 2006) by the Recording Industry Association of Japan (RIAJ) with physical shipments of four million units in Japan. Additionally, the album is the second best-selling album of the 2000s decade in Japan.

== Promotion ==
The promotion for A Best was extensive. Between March and April 2001, Hamasaki appeared in over 40 Japanese magazines. She traveled to different areas in Japan to take part in photo shoots, but was told several times to wait before commencing. Hamasaki appeared in several commercial advertisements, including the Takanoyuri Beauty Clinic print-only campaign "Pink Pink Festival". She also signed a deal with Japanese make-up company Kosé Visee as their spokeswoman. Hamasaki became the spokeswoman for the KDDI Corporation subsidiary company Tu-Ka, which manufactured 2G PDC cellular operator's in three metropolitan areas (Tokyo, Nagoya, and Osaka).

Hamasaki confirmed that she would perform two concerts in Tokyo at the Tokyo Dome stadium. During rehearsals for the tour, Hamasaki had to stop due to problems with her hearing in her left ear. Because of this, specific songs had to be cut from the concert tour because of its high frequency levels. Despite this, she did not postpone the rehearsals or concert dates due to tight scheduling. Hamasaki had been hospitalized a few times for consultations, but a doctor confirmed that continuing to pursue music would result in permanent hearing loss. During some stage rehearsals at Tokyo Dome, Hamasaki became ill due to her hearing problems and could not finish the performances. Because of this, the rehearsals had to be hurried.

On July 6, 2001, the concerts' first tour date, over 30,000 fans lined up for the show. However, tour organizers asked them to wait longer due to Hamasaki's hospitalization. Hamasaki returned from the hospital, and was escorted to the stage with a wheelchair. Both concerts were commercial successes, selling out on both tour dates, and made her one of few "top-drawer" Japanese artists to hold a concert at the Tokyo Dome. With sales from both the concert and album, Hamasaki was recognized as the top selling artist of 2001 with over 24 billion yen. In the aftermath of the tour, Hamasaki had become completely deaf in her left ear. She documented the condition, and publicly announced in January 2008 that she had been diagnosed with an inoperable ear condition (possibly tinnitus or Ménière's disease). Despite the setback, Hamasaki stated that she wished to continue singing, and that she would "not give up" on her fans and that "as a professional", she wanted to "deliver the best performance for everyone".

A live DVD was released on December 12, 2001 through Avex Trax. A limited edition VHS and DVD was released with different artwork and packaging. Through an exclusive deal with Sony, a limited edition PlayStation 2 musical video game entitled Visual Mix: Ayumi Hamasaki Dome Tour 2001 was released. The video game is split into three sections; the visual mix (where the player uses the controller to change and direct the respective music videos and concert tour, alongside special effects editing), the Ayu-Mi-x studio (where the player can create and edit music through her songs "Unite!" and "Endless Sorrow"), and Ayu Browser (which is an online browser using customized Ayu settings).

=== Singles ===
"M" was released as the album's lead single on December 8, 2000 and was later included on her I Am... album in 2002. "M" was Hamasaki's first single she composed herself after her production team failed to compose a track in her liking. Upon its release, it garnered positive reviews from music critics. Many critics commended the song's composition, lyrical content, and highlighted the track as one of Hamasaki's best singles in her career. "M" was successful in Japan, peaking at number one on the Japanese Oricon Singles Chart by selling over 500,000 units in its first week of sales. It became Hamasaki's seventh number one single on that chart. By the end of 2001, "M" sold over 1.32 million units and was certified million by the Recording Industry Association of Japan (RIAJ) for exceeding one million shipments in that region. The single charted at number 87 on the Japan Billboard Adult Alternative chart. The single was certified platinum by the RIAJ for selling over 250,000 digital units in Japan, tallying the single's sales to 1.76 million units as of 2014. The accompanying music video for the single was shot in Tokyo by Wataru Takeishi; it features Hamasaki inside a church, with scenes of her wearing a wedding dress and singing with her backup band in the rain.

"M" was re-released in Germany through Drizzly Records on November 3, 2003, with Hamasaki using her European stage name Ayu. The single was a triple re-release from the A Best and I Am... album, and the Ayu Trance compilation remix album, on a vinyl and CD Maxi single format. The re-released single was remixed by Above & Beyond, and was served as Ayu's second, first, and sixth international single in Germany, Spain, and North America. The accompanying music video for the remix single was shot in Tokyo by Masato Okazaki; it features several images and video shots of Hamasaki's performances, whilst including different computer generated imagery.

== Legacy ==
"..I had to. But I was just so shocked. I thought they had to be joking."

— Hamasaki answering a question on whether she wanted the album released; in retrospect, 2004.

By 2007, A Best sold over 4.3 million units in Japan, making it the sixth best selling album in that region. This makes Hamasaki the second female artist to claim the spot; the other two entries were both by Utada. By 2010, Avex confirmed that it had sold 4.5 million units. With additional sales from digital purchases, A Best has sold over five million units in Japan, making this Hamasaki's best selling effort as of today. Both Hamasaki and Utada's albums were the fastest-selling albums of all time globally, having each sold nearly three million units. The record was broken in 2015 by British musician Adele's studio album 25, which sold over 3.4 million units in the United States and reached number one on the US Billboard 200. The album was recognized as the third best selling album through digital store in 2014, and was placed second the following year.

The album has been cited by several publications as one of Hamasaki's best work to date. Alexey Eremenko from AllMusic stated that, whilst the album was a success, he noted that A Best was the moment that there was the "serious friction" between Hamasaki and her label; this was one of the first publicized rifts between the parties in Japan music history. In honour of the album's release, Hamasaki continued embroiling her studio albums with her symbolic "" logo. It was issued on her compilation albums; A Ballads (2003), the A Best 2 (2007) black and white editions, A Complete: All Singles (2008), A Summer Best (2012) and M(a)de in Japan (2016) where it's put in brackets. A Best also brought Hamasaki a number of accolades and award nominations. At the Annual 2001 Japan Gold Disc Awards, Hamasaki won Single of the Year for "M" and Domestic Artist of the Year. The following year, she won Domestic Artist of the Year again and Pop Album of the Year for A Best. At the 2001 World Music Awards, Hamasaki won the regional award for Best Japanese Act. At the 2002 MTV Asian Awards, Hamasaki won a special award entitled the Most influential Japanese artist in Asia. At the first 2002 MTV Video Music Awards Japan, Hamasaki won the award for Best Female Artist, alongside nominations for Best Video of the Year and Best Pop Artist.

Hamasaki was interviewed in 2004 for the Nippon TV special documentary Light and Shadow: Despair and Decision at Age 25. With regards to A Best, she commented that she resented being recognized as a "product" rather than a real person, and that she was considered the most "important product" to Avex. Hamasaki denied claims of retirement from the music industry, but threatened her position within Avex by wanting to separate from them. She further explained her staying with the company; "I knew that if I didn't stay with the company, I'd never be able to come back to it. I'd live very thoroughly here, but I thought 'I just want to live like a human.' I was significant to them [Avex Trax], so I felt like 'lets fight the man' I guess. I wanted to resist the company even though I felt like I was part of it."

=== Re-issue ===
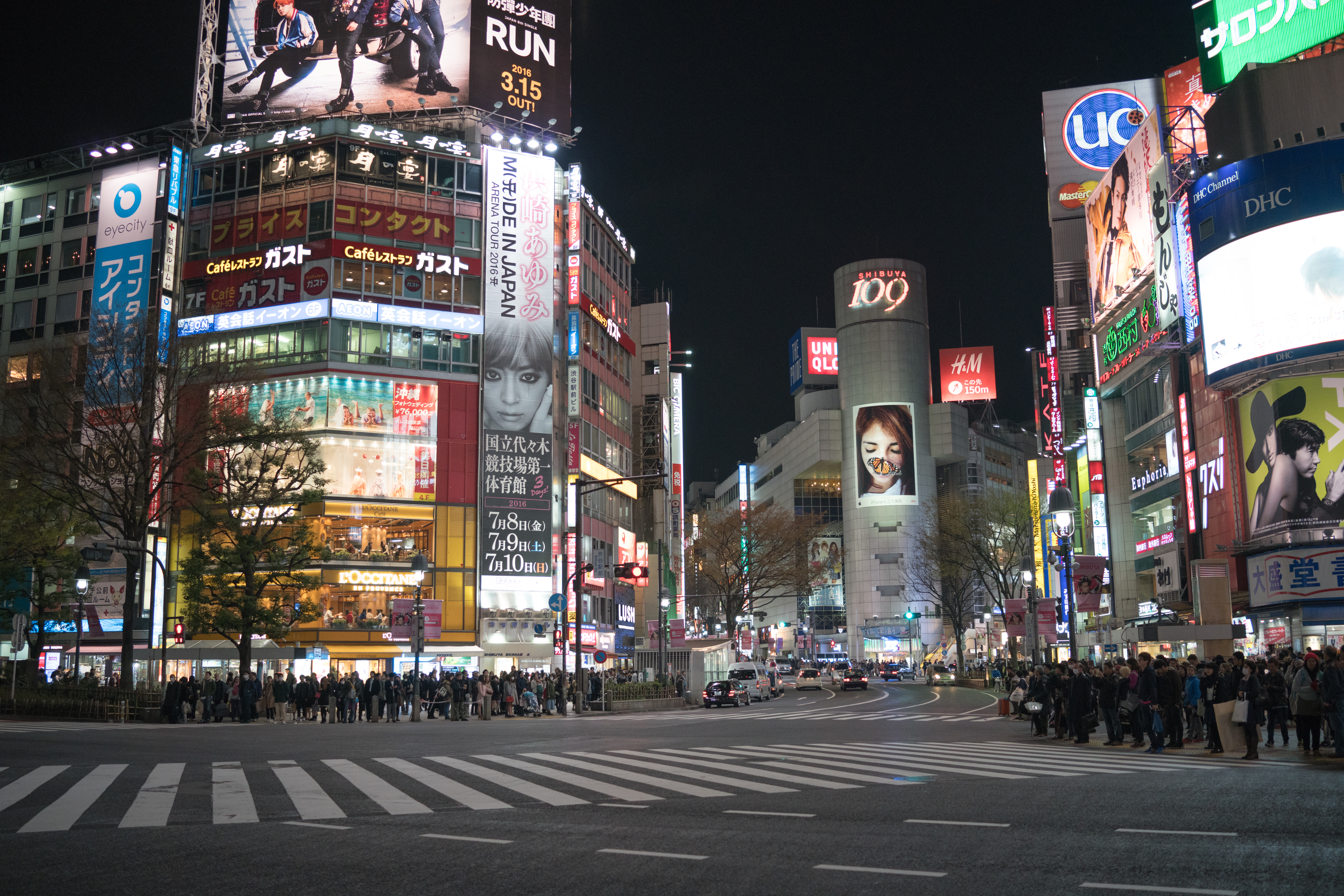
A concert poster for Made in Japan hanging near the center at Shibuya Crossing in 2016

On January 28, 2016, Hamasaki announced via her official website the re-release of A Best. Hamasaki confirmed that the album would be released on the same date as the original album, and was entitled the 15th Anniversary Edition. The reissue included the original 16 tracks, but have been remastered by American engineer and producer Stephen Marcussen. This is Marcussen's first collaboration with Hamasaki, and mastered the album at his own Marcussen Studio's in Hollywood, California. The original album cover is used on both the cardboard sleeve and jewel case. Initial promotion of the album offered T-shirt designs of the six alternative jewel case album covers, handwritten lyrics to the album lyrics, and a specialized anniversary book. On one of Hamasaki's posts on her website, several Japanese public figures such as ice skater Mao Asada, Japanese model and actress Riisa Naka, music writer Mihi Fujii, and sociologist Noritoshi Furuichi took appreciation and retrospect in the collection and commended Hamasaki's longevity in the music industry.

The album is released in four formats; a standard CD, a CD and DVD bundle, a CD and Blu-ray bundle, and a digital release. All physical editions include the remastered 16 tracks, whilst the digital download includes three bonus a cappella versions of "A Song for ××", "Trust", and "Depend on You". The DVD and Blu-ray bundles are housed inside a special box packaging, and features the music videos to ten of the tracks. On its opening day release, A Best: 15th Anniversary Edition debuted at number nine on the Oricon Daily Albums Chart with just over 2,000 units sold. To promote the album, Hamasaki appeared on the Japanese music television show Music Station on March 25, 2016. Hamasaki hosted a special website, where her fans used their Twitter accounts to "share" memories about the album; all entries were placed on the album cover's collage.

On the same day of the album's announcement, Hamasaki announced an arena concert tour in Japan entitled Made in Japan. The concert tour is an expansion of her New Year's Eve Countdown live show with the same name, and is in support of A Best: 15th Anniversary Edition.

== Track listing ==
All lyrics are written by Ayumi Hamasaki.

No.	Title	Music	Arranger(s)	Length
1.	"A Song for ××" (new vocal and mix)	Yasuhiko Hoshino	Akimitsu Honma
2.	"Trust" (new vocal and mix)	Takashi Kimura	Akimitsu Honma, Takashi Kimura
3.	"Depend on You" (new vocal & mix)	Kazuhito Kikuchi	Akamitsu Honma, Takashi Morio
4.	"Love: Destiny"	Tsunku	Shingo Kobayashi, Yasuaki Maejima
5.	"To Be"	D.A.I	Naoto Suzuki, D.A.I
6.	"Boys & Girls"	D.A.I	Naoto Suzuki, D.A.I
7.	"Trauma"	D.A.I	Naoto Suzuki, D.A.I
8.	"End Roll"	D.A.I	Naoto Suzuki, D.A.I
9.	"Appears"	Kazuhito Kikuchi	HΛL
10.	"Fly High"	D.A.I	HΛL
11.	"Vogue"	Kazuhito Kikuchi	Naoto Suzuki, Kazuhito Kikuchi
12.	"Far Away"	Kazuhito Kikuchi, D.A.I	HΛL
13.	"Seasons"	D.A.I	Naoto Suzuki
14.	"Surreal"	Kazuhito Kikuchi	HΛL
15.	"M"	Ayumi Hamasaki	HΛL
16.	"Who..."	Kazuhito Kikuchi	Naoto Suzuki

A Best – 15th Anniversary Edition digital download bonus tracks
No.	Title	Length
17.	"A Song for ××" (acapella version)
18.	"Trust" (acapella version)
19.	"Depend on You" (acapella version)

A Best – 15th Anniversary Edition DVD and Blu-ray editions
No.	Title	Length
1.	"Trust" (music video)
2.	"Depend on You" (music video)
3.	"Love (Destiny)" (music video)
4.	"To Be" (music video)
5.	"Boys & Girls" (music video)
6.	"Appears" (music video)
7.	"Fly High" (music video)
8.	"Vogue/Far Away/Seasons" (music video)
9.	"Surreal" (music video)
10.	"M" (music video)

== Credits and personnel ==
Credits adapted from the liner notes of the CD.

- Ayumi Hamasaki – vocals, background vocals, song writing, composer and arrangement (under the alias Crea)
- Max Matsuura – producer, manager
- Akimisu Honma – keyboards
- Naoki Hayashibe – guitar
- Hiroshi Kitashiro – programming
- Takahiro Iida – programming
- Naoto Suzuki – keyboards, programming
- Masayoshi Furukawa – guitar
- Hidetoshi Suzuki – guitar
- Jun Kajiwara – guitar
- HΛL – programming, keyboards, composing
- Dai "D.A.I." Nagao – composing, arrangement
- Naoya Akimoto – guitar
- Junko Hirotani – background vocals
- Yasuhiko Hoshino – composing
- Takashi Kimura – composing
- Kazuhito Kikuchi – composing
- Tsunku – composing
- Takashi Kimura – arrangement
- Takashi Morio – arrangement
- Shingo Kobayashi – arrangement
- Yasuaki Maejima – arrangement
- Keita Haginiwa – photographer
- Shigeru Kasai – designer
- Avex Trax – Hamasaki's record label
- Avex Music Creative Inc. – Hamasaki's record label

== Charts ==
=== Weekly charts ===
Chart (2001)	Peak position
Japanese Albums (Oricon)	1
Singaporean Albums (SPVA)	1

=== Monthly charts ===
Chart (2001)	Peak position
Japanese Albums (Oricon)	2

=== Year-end charts ===
Chart (2001)	Position
Japanese Albums (Oricon)	2

=== Decade-end charts ===
Chart (2000–2009)	Position
Japanese Albums (Oricon)	2

=== All-time chart ===
Chart	Position
Japanese Albums (Oricon)	6

== Sales and certifications ==
Region	Certification	Certified units/sales
Japan (RIAJ)	4× Million	4,294,179
Singapore	—	10,000
Summaries
Asia	—	5,000,000

== Release history ==
Region	Date	Format	Catalogue number
Japan	March 28, 2001	CD	AVCD-11691
Taiwan	2001	CD	AVJCD-10008
Hong Kong	April 2001	CD	AVTCD-95461
Indonesia	2001	CD	AVCD-0060601
Indonesia	2001	Cassette	AV-0060601
Japan	March 28, 2016	CD+DVD+Blu-Ray	AVZD-93409/B~C
Japan	March 28, 2016	CD	AVCD-93410
Taiwan	March 28, 2016	CD, Reissue, & Remastered	AVJCD-10645/A: (15th Anniversary Edition)

== See also ==
- List of fastest-selling albums worldwide
- List of best-selling albums in Japan
- List of Oricon number-one albums of 2001
