= 2007 in Japanese music =

The following is an overview of the year 2007 in Japanese music. It includes notable awards, lists of number-ones, yearly best-sellers, albums released, groups established and disestablished, deaths of notable Japanese music-related people as well as any other relevant Japanese music-related events. For overviews of the year in music from other countries, see 2007 in music.

== Events ==
- December 31 – 28th NHK Kōhaku Uta Gassen

== Awards ==
- May 26 – 2007 MTV Video Music Awards Japan
- December 30 – 49th Japan Record Awards

== Number-ones ==
- Oricon number-one albums
- Oricon number-one singles

== Best-sellers ==
=== Albums ===
The following is a list of the top 10 best-selling albums in Japan in 2007, according to Oricon.

Rank	Album	Artist
1	Home	Mr. Children
2	Black Cherry	Kumi Koda
3	All Singles Best	Kobukuro
4	The Best Damn Thing	Avril Lavigne
5	A Best 2: White	Ayumi Hamasaki
6	Ai Am Best	Ai Otsuka
7	A Best 2: Black	Ayumi Hamasaki
8	Ketsunopolis 5	Ketsumeishi
9	Can't Buy My Love	Yui
10	Greatest Hits	Sukima Switch

== Albums released ==
The following section includes albums by Japanese artists released in Japan in 2007 as well as Japanese-language albums by foreign artists released in the country during this year.

- February 2 – The Marrow of a Bone by Dir En Grey
- February 28 – A Best 2: Black by Ayumi Hamasaki
- February 28 – A Best 2: White by Ayumi Hamasaki
- March 7 – Dear... by Sachi Tainaka
- March 7 – Journey by W-inds.
- March 14 – BeForU III by BeForU
- March 14 – Home by Mr. Children
- March 28 – Ai Am Best by Ai Otsuka
- April 4 – Can't Buy My Love by Yui
- April 18 – 2 Mini: Ikiru to Iu Chikara by Cute
- April 18 – Cartoon KAT-TUN II You by KAT-TUN
- April 18 – Diary by Shiori Takei
- May 9 – Go to the Future by Sakanaction
- May 23 – 1st GAM: Amai Yuwaku by GAM
- June 6 – KJ2 Zukkoke Dai Dassō by Kanjani Eight
- June 17 – Ā, Domo. Hajimemashite by Greeeen
- July 4 – Circus by FictionJunction Yuuka
- July 6 – Fun! Fun! Fun! by Shonen Knife
- July 11 – Kyohei Tsutsumi Tribute: The Popular Music by Various artists
- August 1 – 4th Ai no Nanchara Shisū by Berryz Kobo
- August 1 – Greatest Hits by Sukima Switch
- August 29 – Ketsunopolis 5 by Ketsumeishi
- September 30 – CM Yoko by Yoko Kanno
- October 24 – Contact by Minori Chihara
- November 7 – Metanoia by Yōsei Teikoku
- November 21 – Kiss by L'Arc-en-Ciel
- December 5 – Action by B'z
- December 19 – Kirarin Land by Koharu Kusumi
- December 19 – Luna Sea Memorial Cover Album -Re:birth- by Various artists

== Groups established ==
- 9mm Parabellum Bullet
- Fuyumi Abe
- Acid Black Cherry
- Athena & Robikerottsu
- Thelma Aoyama
- Yui Aragaki
- Aqua5
- Bright
- Buono!
- Coldrain
- Cherryblossom
- Chocolove from AKB48
- Leah Dizon
- Alan Dawa Dolma
- Exile The Second
- Genki Rockets
- Hey! Say! JUMP
- Hotch Potchi
- J-Min
- Kira Pika
- Natsumi Kiyoura
- Love
- Kelun
- Teppei Koike
- Nao Matsushita
- Masami Mitsuoka
- Mamoru Miyano
- Morning Musume Tanjō 10nen Kinentai
- Uri Nakayama
- Nichika
- Nico Touches the Walls
- Hatsune Okumura
- On/Off
- One Ok Rock
- Ongaku Gatas
- PureBoys
- Sakanaction
- Erika Sawajiri
- Skin
- School Food Punishment
- Sekai no Owari
- Stephanie
- Superfly
- Satomi Takasugi
- Nana Tanimura
- Kinoko Teikoku
- Tomboy
- Yanokami

== Groups disestablished ==
- Morning Musume Tanjō 10nen Kinentai

== See also ==
- 2007 in Japan
- 2007 in Japanese television
- List of Japanese films of 2007
