= Ayumi Hamasaki Countdown Live 2000–2001 A =

Video by Ayumi Hamasaki
- Released: June 20, 2001
- Genre: J-pop

Ayumi Hamasaki chronology
Ayumi Hamasaki Concert Tour 2000 Vol. 2 (2000)	Ayumi Hamasaki Countdown Live 2000–2001 A (2001)	Ayumi Hamasaki Dome Tour 2001 A (2001)

Ayumi Hamasaki's Countdown Live 2000–2001 A was released on June 20, 2001. The Countdown Live was the album of the second iteration of Ayumi's live show designed to commemorate the end and beginning of the years. The combined discs include 16 songs, with variants of the album released in March and June after the performance.

== Track listing ==
All lyrics are written by Ayumi Hamasaki.

Countdown Live 2000–2001 A: Disc 1
No.	Title	Length
1.	"Starting Over"
2.	"Duty"
3.	"Fly High"
4.	"Vogue"
5.	"Teddy Bear"
6.	"A Song for XX"
7.	"End of the World"
8.	"SURREAL"
9.	"Boys & Girls"
10.	"evolution"
11.	"AUDIENCE"
12.	"Trauma"
13.	"Key 〜eternal tie ver.〜"

Countdown Live 2000–2001 A: Encore
No.	Title	Length
1.	"Seasons"
2.	"M"
3.	"girlish"
