= Who... =

Promotional single by Ayumi Hamasaki

from the album Loveppears and A Complete: All Singles
- Released: September 10, 2008
- Recorded: 1999
- Genre: J-Pop
- Length: 5:36
- Label: Avex Trax
- Songwriter: Hamasaki
- Producer: Max Matsuura

"Who..." is a Japanese-language song recorded by singer Ayumi Hamasaki. It served as a standard track to her second studio album Loveppears (1999), and was re-recorded and released as a promotional single by Avex Trax in Japan as part of the promotion towards her fifth greatest hits compilation album A Complete: All Singles on September 10, 2008. The track was written by Hamasaki herself, while production was handled by long-time collaborator Max Matsuura. Musically, it is a J-Pop ballad that was written in third-person perspective, like the rest of the content from Loveppears. The lyrics details the encapsulation of Hamasaki, and explaining her message of her own philosophy. During its promotional release in 2008, it reached number 49 on the Billboard Adult Alternative Songs chart in Japan, and number 19 on the RIAJ Monthly Ringtones chart. It was certified Platinum by the Recording Industry Association of Japan (RIAJ) for digital sales of 250,000 units. To promote the single, it appeared on remix and greatest hits compilation albums conducted by Hamasaki.

== Background and versions ==
"Who..." first appeared on Hamasaki's second studio album Loveppears (1999). It was written by Hamasaki herself, while production was handled by long-time collaborator Max Matsuura. The song's instrumentation included keyboards by the album's sound producer Naoto Suzuki, and acoustic guitars by Japanese musician Naoki Hayashibe. It was composed by Kazuhito Kikuchi, whilst programming was handled by Takahiro Iida and mixed by Dave Way. On Loveppears, "Who..." included a hidden track titled "Kanariya", which served as the second to last single from the album, and the overall duration of both tracks together lasted for 10 minutes. Lyrically, the song was written in third person perspective, a trait that is shared with the rest of the album's tracks. According to Hamasaki's management team, they stated that the lyrics are an "encapsulation of today's Ayumi Hamasaki, and it was produced to present her message and philosophy." It was included again on her 2001 compilation album A Best, which was the only non-single track on there, and later featured on its 15th-anniversary edition in March 2016.

On March 12, 2003, Hamasaki re-recorded the song for her 2003 concept compilation album A Ballads. In a special commentary for the album hosted by Avex Trax, "Who..." was voted by her fans as the most requested song for the inclusion towards the album. The re-composed and re-arranged version for A Ballads' featured a more "drifter" and "harder punch" than the original, but Hamasaki "expressed a desire to make the song warmer than the original version." By her request, the album's arranger CMJK created a more "majestic" and "dramatic" version that appeared as the final cut. Then on September 10, 2008, Hamasaki re-recorded the track and released it in part of her fifth greatest hits album A Complete: All Singles. Like its inclusion on A Best, it was the only non-album single on the album but was promoted in Japan in conjunction with the promotion of the greatest hits. A Chinese version was recorded for the Hong Kong, Chinese, and Taiwanese editions of the compilation.

== Reception and promotion ==
Commercially, "Who..." was a success in Japan. The 2008 version from A Complete: All Singles debuted at number 49 on the Billboard Adult Alternative Songs chart in Japan, and stayed there for a sole week. In a similar run, it debuted at number 19 on the RIAJ Monthly Ringtone charts in the same region, one of Hamasaki's fewer tracks to ever enter in that record chart; the song stayed there for a sole month. It was certified Platinum by the Recording Industry Association of Japan (RIAJ) for digital sales of 250,000 units. "Who..." has been heavily promoted on compilation albums conducted by Hamasaki. It has been included on five of Hamasaki's remix albums, including Ayu-mi-x II Version Acoustic Orchestra and Ayu-mi-x II Version Non-Stop Mega Mix (2000). The song has been included on several concert tours by Hamasaki, including part one and part two of her 2000 concert tour, her 2002 Stadium tour, and her 2008–2009 Premium Countdown concert.

== Personnel ==
Credits adapted from the CD liner notes of Loveppears:

Recording

- Recorded at Prime Sound Studio, Studio Sound Dali, Onkio Haus, Tokyo, Japan in 1999.

Credits

- Ayumi Hamasaki – vocals, songwriting, background vocals
- Max Matsuura – production
- Kazuhito Kikuchi – composing, arranging
- Naoto Suzuki – sound producing, arranging, keyboards, synthesizers
- Naoki Hayashibe – acoustic guitar
- Shigeo Miyamoto – mastering
- Takahiro Iida – programming
- Dave Way – mixing

== Charts ==
=== Weekly charts ===
Chart (2008)	Peak position
Japan Adult Alternative Songs Chart (Billboard)	49

=== Monthly chart ===
Chart (2008)	Peak position
Japan Monthly Ringtones (RIAJ)	19

== Certifications ==
Region	Certification	Certified units/sales
Japan (RIAJ) Digital single	Platinum	250,000^{*}
^{*} Sales figures based on certification alone.

== See also ==
- Ayumi Hamasaki discography
