= Connected (Ayumi Hamasaki song) =

Single by Ayumi Hamasaki

from the album I am...
- Released: April 7, 2003 (Europe)
- Genre: Trance
- Label: Avex; Drizzly Records
- Songwriters: Ayumi Hamasaki (lyrics); Ferry Corsten (music)
- Producer: Ferry Corsten

Ayumi Hamasaki singles chronology
"Voyage" (2002)	"Connected" (2003)	"&" (2003)

Ayumi Hamasaki German singles chronology
"Connected" (2003)	"M" (2003)

"Connected" is a song by Japanese singer Ayumi Hamasaki from her fourth studio album I Am... (2002). It was released as a single in Europe under the alias Ayu. The song was written by Hamasaki herself while it was produced by Dutch disc jockey Ferry Corsten. The song was first conceived when Corsten had developed a track in Europe entitled "The Lots of Love". Despite him playing it at several events and shows throughout Europe, he did not release the track. After this, Hamasaki and Corsten had started to collaborate and the pair had changed and used the finishing result to create "Connected".

Musically, "Connected" is a trance song that utilizes electro and dance music, which was a prominent musical genre during early 2000s. The song achieved favorable reception from most music critics, who had praised the musical collaboration and electronic influence within the album. However, some critics were divided by the lack of progression and Hamasaki's vocal abilities. It was released as her first European single on April 7, 2003, and peaked at number 89 on the official singles chart in Germany. An accompanying music video was shot for the single by Kouji Morimoto and featured anime inspired themes and features people in a futuristic city.

The song was performed live on her New Year's Eve Countdown Live 2001-2002 and on her Premium Showcase: Feel the Love tour in Nagoya, Osaka and Tokyo, the first in 13 years since she performed the song live.

== Background and composition ==
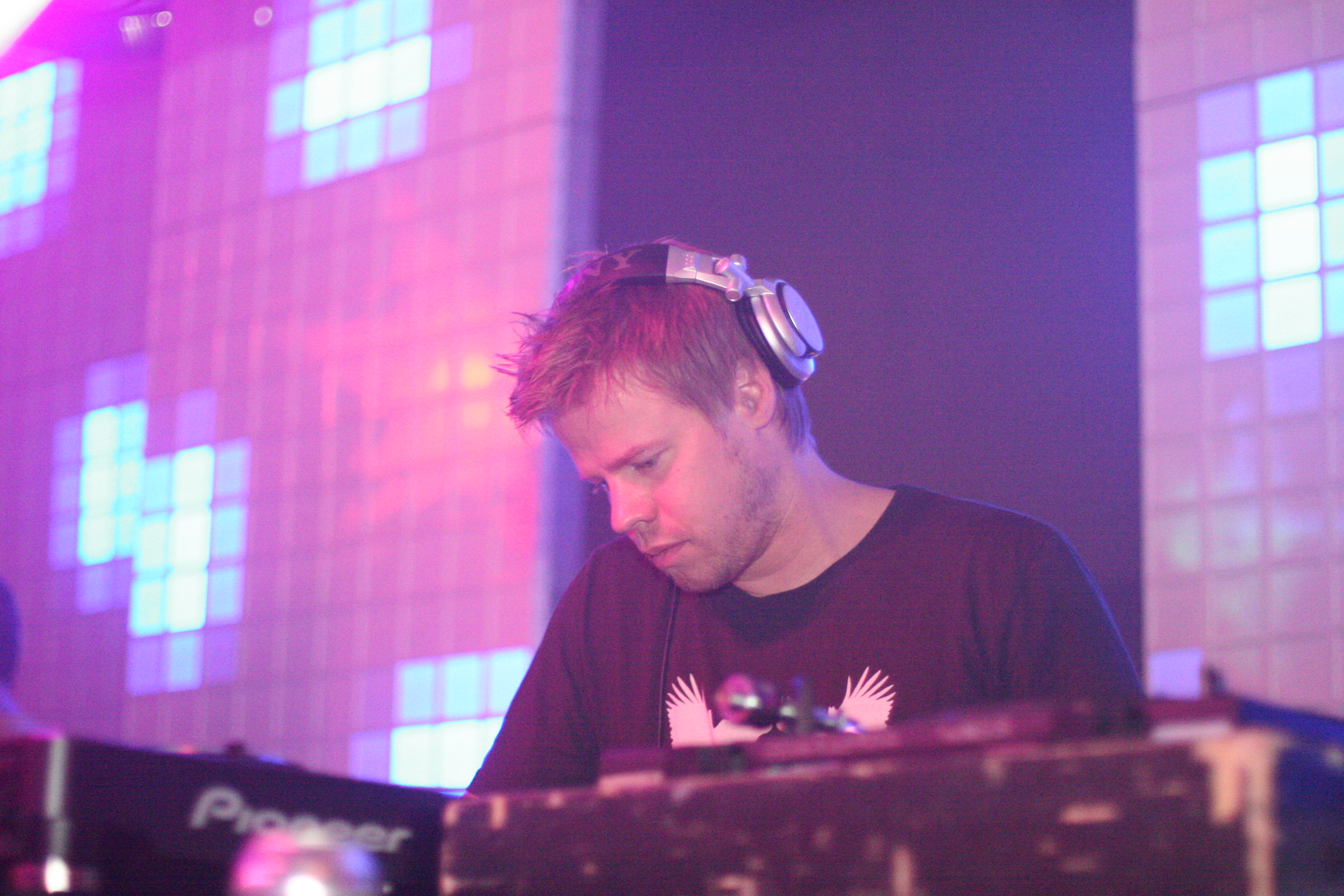
Dutch DJ and producer Ferry Corsten (pictured) produced and composed the track.

During the early 2000s era, Hamasaki had received massive attention and commercial commendation for her musical efforts. Her third studio album Duty sold nearly three million copies and was certified triple platinum by the Recording Industry Association of Japan (RIAJ) and the third single "Seasons" became Hamasaki's third million selling single, having sold over 1.3 million units in Japan and was certified Million by RIAJ. The success continued on with the work off I Am..., which was released on New Year's Day, 2002 and received favorable reception from most Japanese critics. The album was also a commercial success, selling over 2.3 million units in Japan and was certified triple platinum by RIAJ. With countless singles being released throughout the album, the lead single "M" became her fourth million selling single and sold 1.32 million units in Japan. (Note: "M" received a 3× Platinum certification for 1,200,000 copies, however the 3× Platinum threshold was redefined as 750,000 copies in 2003.)

"Connected" was originally a trance composition made by Ferry Corsten, who went under the name "East West" which was called "The Love I Lost". Although Corsten had played the song live in several events and shows, he never officially released it as a single. When Corsten collaborated with Hamasaki he altered the riff for "The Love I Lost" and let her write lyrics for it. "Connected" was initially included on Hamasaki's album I Am..., and later on The Very Best Of Ferry Corsten, compilation released by the Avex label in Japan and other Asian countries.

Written by Hamasaki herself, "Connected" became her first song from her discography to have been produced and composed by someone outside of her native Japan, and was her only song during the time to be produced by someone else apart from Max Matsuura. (Note: Her 2010 single "Dream On" with Japanese singer Naoya Urata was an exception, being produced and composed by Hamasaki herself.) Musically, "Connected" is a trance-inspired song that incorporates contemporary dance music and electro music. During the song, Hamasaki's vocals hit considerably higher notes than other tracks on her I Am... album and were often noted as "strained".

== Release and reception ==
Under the alias "Ayu", Drizzly Records in Germany and Lightning Records in Belgium got the rights to release some of Ayumi Hamasaki's trance material. On November 15, 2002, a first vinyl containing previously unreleased versions of the song was released in Germany. On December 6, 2002, a vinyl was released in Belgium. On April 7, 2003 a maxi CD single was officially released in Germany, which included several remixes and alternate versions of the song. Hamasaki continued to release singles (all of them remixes of previously released songs) in Germany on Drizzly until 2005. "Connected" was her last single released from her I Am... album and was released after her 2002 single "Voyage".

"Connected" received favorable reception from most music critics. Jeff from Random.Access gave the song a positive comment, stating "It's pretty good, but only because I like trance music and Ferry Corsten's music too. This was composed prior to Corsten's electro days, so you can only expect pure trance [...]" Jeff had also selected "Connected" as the best track and "Choice Cut" from the parent album. Yolanda from the online publication Music Addiction was positive towards the track, stating "In fact, I think I actually like this song more than I am… already, and it may turn out to be one of the best songs on this album [...]" Although she felt she favored the song particularly due to Yolanda's influence in Hamasaki's "rock music", she felt the song was too short and was a letdown because off it. However, a reviewer from the publication Sputnikmusic was negative towards the song, felling it lacked progression and criticized her vocals for being too high pitched.

== Music video ==
The music video was directed by Kouji Morimoto and the key animation direction was handled by Shinya Ohira. Studio 4 °C. had handled the production off the video and was created by them. The video is shot in anime inspired themes and features people in a futuristic city ("Cyberpunk"). It then features the city destroying other parts of the city, while mysterious space orbs create new buildings and the people watch upon the cities growing.

== Live performances ==
The song was first performed by Hamasaki at her New Year's Eve concert Countdown Live 2001-2002. In 2014, she performed a slightly rearranged version of the song on her Premium Showcase: Feel the Love tour in Nagoya, Osaka and Tokyo. This was the first time in 13 years that the song was performed live.

== Charts ==
=== Weekly charts ===
Chart (2003)	Peak position
Germany (GfK)	89

== Track listing ==
German CD single

1. "Connected" (Radio Edit) (3:23)
2. "Connected" (Talla 2XLC Radio Edit) (3:51)
3. "Connected" (Push Radio Edit) (4:42)
4. "Connected" (Talla 2XLC Instrumental Remix) (7:06)
5. "Connected" (Push Instrumental Dub Remix) (8:09)
6. "Connected" (Long Instrumental) (5:50)
7. "Connected" (Ambient Mix) (5:23)

Belgian CD single

1. "Connected" (Radio Edit) (3:18)
2. "Connected" (Push Radio Edit) (4:40)
3. "Connected" (Ambient Mix) (5:20)

German vinyl

1. "Connected" (Push's Instrumental Dub Remix)
2. "Connected" (Ferry Corsten Extended 12" Mix)
3. "Connected" (Ferry Corsten Instrumental Mix)
4. "Connected" (Push Club Mix)

Belgian vinyl

1. "Connected" (Extended Ferry Corsten Remix)
2. "Connected" (Ambient Mix)
3. "Connected" (Push Club Mix)
4. "Connected" (Push Instrumental Dub)
