= A Ballads =

- Slipcase sleeve and digital artwork

Compilation album by Ayumi Hamasaki
- Released: March 12, 2003
- Recorded: 1998–2003
- Studio: Prime Sound Studio (Tokyo); Cresente Studio (Tokyo); Prime Sound Studio Form (Tokyo); On Air Azabu Studio (Tokyo)
- Genre: Pop
- Length: 72:03
- Label: Avex Trax
- Producer: Max Matsuura

Ayumi Hamasaki chronology
Rainbow (2002)	A Ballads (2003)	Memorial Address (2003)

A Ballads (stylized as BALLADS) is the second greatest hits album by Japanese recording artist Ayumi Hamasaki. It was released physically on March 12, 2003, through Avex Trax, and digitally distributed worldwide on September 14, 2006, by Avex Entertainment Inc. It is her first compilation release in two years since A Best; it premiered three months after her sixth studio album Rainbow. The compilation compiles ballad-inspired singles released by Hamasaki between 1998 and 2003, while the material is divided into new-arrangement remixes and the original versions. With all the tracks written by Hamasaki, it includes two new songs—"Rainbow", which served as the album's promotional single, and a cover version of Japanese singer Yumi Matsutoya's 1975 track "Sotsugyō Shashin".

Released in six formats featuring a photograph by JFKK, A Ballads received favorable reviews from music critics. Many praised the collection for including some of Hamasaki's best vocal work, and commended the songwriting. Minor criticism was aimed on the newer renditions of the original songs. Commercially, the album was a success in Japan, reaching number one on the Oricon Albums Chart, making it Hamasaki's second compilation and eighth album to reach the top spot. It was certified Million by the Recording Industry Association of Japan (RIAJ) for shipments of one million units. The album experienced limited promotion during its release, with some of the tracks appearing during Japanese commercial endorsements.

== Background and material ==
In December 2002, Hamasaki released her sixth studio album Rainbow. Early issues of the album included a code number and URL address that allowed customers to visit an exclusive website that promoted the album and listen to a 40-second demo of her unfinished song "Rainbow". During its promotion, Avex Trax and Hamasaki received over 100,000 messages from fans, telling them their opinions about the unfinished demo. Due to the mixed response of her fanbase, Hamasaki decided to develop the song further and release it as part of an upcoming compilation album, which was later named A Ballads. During the process, Hamasaki confessed that "[she] had never before written lyrics that were based on messages received directly from [her] fans. It was with "Rainbow" that [she] decided to give this approach a try".

A Ballads is Hamasaki's first compilation to compile songs that were inspired by ballad music, with it portraying her second greatest hits album after A Best (2001). Each track from the album was released either as a single or as a promotional recording, recorded between the years 1998 and 2003. Six of the tracks on the album were composed and co-produced by Hamasaki, who used the alias Crea. The album consists of fifteen tracks, including two new recordings—"Rainbow" and a cover version of Japanese singer Yumi Matsutoya's 1975 track "Sotsugyō Shashin". Seven of the album's tracks—"Appears", "You", "To Be", "M", "Seasons", "A Song for ××" and "Who..."— feature new arrangements and compositions, while the songs "Key", "Hanabi", "Dearest" and "Voyage" are included with their original versions.

== Songs ==
"I really wanted to hear (read) all of the messages that were sent in (both lyrics and themes), because if 100,000 people come together, they will see things in 100,000 different ways. Some of the messages I received were very sad, while others conjured up happy images and colors. But I thought that a professional writer would do a better job of tying these words together in a piecemeal manner than I. That's why... I read all of the messages and then wrote lyrics based on what I felt afterward."

— Hamasaki talking about "Rainbow".

To explain Hamasaki's the background and development, Hamasaki hosted a commentary on her website. The first song, "Rainbow", was originally composed by CMJK, but Hamasaki felt the finishing product was "missing something", and re-worked the demo version with Japanese musician Dai Nagao. According to Hamasaki, she wanted to reflect the emotion and words used in each 100,000 messages she received from her fans to create the song, but because there were numerous emails, she decided to write it as a summary and her feelings as an "aftermath" from reading the messages. The song was described by a staff member at CD Journal as an "organic midtempo pop ballad" song. "Appears" was remixed by Japanese group HΛL. According to Hamasaki, she had asked the group to re-compose their original version of the track in order to reflect "current [musical] themes of 2003."

The album included the original version of "Key (Eternal Tie)" as Hamasaki felt that the original was "more important and unknown" than the proposed-reworked version she had planned. "You (Northern Breeze)" was one of the last reworked tracks, and was described by Hamasaki as being influenced by Western music. "To Be (2003 ReBirth Mix)" was not re-worked or re-arranged by any of the album's collaborators, with it being purely remastered and mixed again by music engineer Koji Morimoto. "Hanabi" was one of the album's only tracks to appear in its original version, and has been described by a CD Journal staff member to have been inspired by Europop, trip hop, and dub music. "Dolls", a J-pop influenced pop ballad, remained the sophomore original track to make part of the record.

Like "To Be", the next track "Seasons" was remastered and mixed by Morimoto. The final original track, "Voyage", was described by CD Journal as a midtempo ballad influenced by gospel music, layered with several string arrangements and other instrumentation. "A Song for ××" was re-worked as a live demo, recorded at the Avex Trax studios in Japan. For the promotional track "Who...", Hamasaki asked CMJK to create a more "warmer" version than the original. The closing track for A Ballads was "Sotsugyō Shashin". According to Hamasaki, she had imagined recording a cover for a studio album, but was unsuccessful at doing so. To compose the track, she and the song's co-composer Tasuku composed it by using a Fender Rhodes Suitcase Mk I electric piano in order to reflect the song's original 1960s–1970s pop influence.

== Release ==
A Ballads was released physically on March 12, 2003, through Avex Trax in five formats, and digitally distributed worldwide on September 14, 2006, by Avex Entertainment Inc. The first five formats were compact discs; each one of the four early editions included a slipcase sleeve that had two clones of Hamasaki asleep next to each other, with the inner booklet portraying four different photographs of the clones. The four alternative covers were different variations of the two Hamasaki figures in a pink-coloured room. The fifth format came without a slipcase, and had the slipcase image as the inner booklet cover. The digital release featured the slipcase cover and the entire photo shoot was photographed by JFKK.

== Reception ==
Upon its release, A Ballads received favorable reviews from most music critics. Tetsuo Hiraga from Hot Express believed that the album's material was able to connect with both younger and older audiences. He also pointed out the "Royal-esque" tracks "Seasons" and "Dearests" as some of her best recordings. In a similar review, a staff member of CD Journal enjoyed the album and complimented its new additions to the album.

Commercially, the album was successful in Japan, with it debuting at number one on the Oricon Albums Chart and replacing 200 Km/h in the Wrong Lane (2002) by Russian female duo t.A.T.u. at the top spot. Hamasaki's entry sold 561,127 units in comparison to t.A.T.u.'s 167,627 unit sales. By the end of 2003, A Ballads was ranked at number eight as the best selling album in Japan of that year. It sold 917,555 units, and was also her second album to enter the annual top ten, just behind Rainbow which sold 1,856,919 units. As of July 2016, it has sold 924,242 units, her first greatest hits album to not sell over the one million mark. Nevertheless, it was certified Million by the Recording Industry Association of Japan (RIAJ) for shipments of one million units. (Note: A Ballads received a 4× Platinum certification for selling 1,600,000 copies; this threshold was depreciated in 2003.) It is Hamasaki's ninth best selling album based on Oricon's sale database.

== Promotion ==
The album experienced limited promotion during its release, with some of the tracks appearing during Japanese commercial endorsements. (Note: A selection of tracks which were promoted through their parent studio albums may have been included on the compilation. For further information on the singles, see the citations.) The compilation's only release was promotional song "Rainbow", which was used as the theme song for Hamasaki's Japanese talk show Ayuready?, and to promote products by Lumix. An accompanying music video for the song was directed by Wataru Takeishi, featuring two clones of Hamasaki chasing each other, and eventually meeting at a dinner in Japan. Near the end of the video, it is revealed that the second clone is in fact her imagination or conscious.

== Track listing ==
All lyrics are written by Ayumi Hamasaki with the exception of Yumi Matsutoya's contribution on track 14.

CD and digital download
No.	Title	Music	Arranger(s)	Length
1.	"Rainbow"	Crea (Note: Crea acts as the pseudonym for Ayumi Hamasaki.); D.A.I	CMJK	5:29
2.	"Appears" (HΛL's Progress)	Kazuhito Kikuchi	HΛL	5:57
3.	"Key" (Eternal Tie Ver.)	Kunio Tago	Naoto Suzuki	3:15
4.	"You" (Northern Breeze)	Yasuhiko Hoshino	Tasuku	5:03
5.	"To Be" (2003 ReBirth Mix)	D.A.I	Naoto Suzuki; D.A.I	4:49
6.	"Hanabi"	Crea; D.A.I	CMJK	4:49
7.	"M" (HΛL's Progress Remix)	Crea	HΛL	5:24
8.	"Dearest"	Crea; D.A.I	Naoto Suzuki	5:34
9.	"Dolls"	Crea	HΛL	5:56
10.	"Seasons" (2003 ReBirth Mix)	D.A.I	Naoto Suzuki	4:20
11.	"Voyage"	Crea; D.A.I	Ken Shima	5:07
12.	"A Song for ××" (030213 Session #2 Take)	Yasuhiko Hoshino	Shingo Kobayashi	5:51
13.	"Who..." (Across the Universe Mix)	Kazuhito Kikuchi	CMJK	5:36
14.	"Sotsugyō Shashin (卒業写真, School Photograph)" (Yumi Matsutoya cover)	Yumi Matsutoya	Tasuku	4:22

== Charts ==
=== Weekly charts ===
Chart (2003)	Peak position
Japanese Albums (Oricon)	1

=== Monthly charts ===
Chart (2003)	Peak position
Japanese Albums (Oricon)	1

=== Year-end charts ===
Chart (2003)	Position
Japanese Albums (Oricon)	8

== Certifications ==
Region	Certification	Certified units/sales
Japan (RIAJ)	Million	924,242

== Release history ==
Region	Date	Format	Catalogue number
Japan	March 12, 2003	CD (Copy Control CD)	AVCD-17278
Taiwan	2003	CD (Copy Control CD)	AVJCD-10160
Hong Kong	March 2003	CD (Copy Control CD)	AVTCD-95676
Indonesia	2003	Cassette	AV 0370303
