= Audience (Ayumi Hamasaki song) =

Single by Ayumi Hamasaki

from the album Duty
- B-side: "see track list"
- Released: 1 November 2000
- Recorded: Tokyo, Japan. 2000
- Genre: Dance-pop; rock; disco
- Length: 4:08
- Label: Avex Trax; Rhythm Republic Records
- Songwriter: Ayumi Hamasaki
- Producers: Max Matsuura; Naoto Suzuki (see composition)

Ayumi Hamasaki singles chronology
"Surreal" (2000)	"Audience" (2000)	"M" (2000)

Promotional Video
- "Audience" on YouTube

"Audience" is a song by Japanese recording artist Ayumi Hamasaki from her third studio album Duty (2000). It was released as the album's fifth and final single on 1 November 2000 by Avex Trax. Hamasaki wrote the track and Max Matsuura Lewis produced it. Dai Nagao and HΛL composed both the single and album version. The single artwork was shot by Japanese photographer Toru Kumazawa and features duplicate clones of Hamasaki, resembling an audience. Musically, "Audience" is a dance–pop and disco song.

"Audience" received positive reviews from music critics; many highlighted it from the parent album and her music career. It achieved lukewarm success in compare to her previous singles, with a peak position of number three on the Oricon Singles Chart and a gold certification by the Recording Industry Association of Japan (RIAJ). The single remains Hamasaki's twenty–seventh best selling single in Japan. No music video was shot for the single.

== Background and composition ==
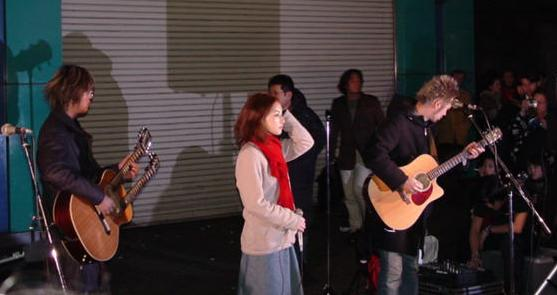
Dai Nagao (left) produced and composed the song, along with other of Hamasaki's subsequent releases.

Ayumi Hamasaki's track "Audience" appeared on her third studio album, Duty (2000). Hamasaki begun work on Duty and followed a similar musical concept like her first two albums A Song for ×× (January 1999) and Loveppears (November 1999). "Audience" was written by Hamasaki. Majority of the lyrics were about loneliness, chaos, confusion, and the burden of her responsibilities, aimed mostly towards her public image as a recording artist. In contrast to "Audience", the trilogy singles focused on hopelessness, a reflection of Hamasaki's disappointment that she had not expressed herself thoroughly in any of her previous lyrics. She described her feelings after the writing as "unnatural" and was constantly "nervous" for the final result.

The song was recorded in mid–2000 in Tokyo, Japan. Max Matsuura produced both the single version and the album version, with additional production handling by Naoto Suzuki for the single version. HΛL played the keyboard, Suzuki played the guitar and all other instruments were handled by Dai Nagao. "Audience" is a dance song that employs elements of disco music. In comparison, Duty was a rock–influenced album and "Audience" was the only dance track on the album.

"Audience" was her third song to incorporate an English–language phrase, alongside her single "Whatever" (February 1999) and the b–side to "Love (Destiny)", "Love: Since 1999" (May 1999). (Note: The exclamation "Yes" is commonly used in the English–language and alternative European–languages. Technically, "Yes" is spoken and written in an English format and has been listed in the 1913 Webster Dictionary, so it proves that "Audience" is her third song to use an English–language word.) But because "Audience" and "Whatever" used one–worded phrases and "Love: Since 1999" was not written by Hamasaki, it does not count in using English–language conversation like she did in her 2002 album Rainbow.

== Release and promotion ==
"Audience" was released on 1 November 2000 in CD format by Avex Trax, as the fifth single from Duty. The maxi single features over nine remixes, one instrumental and an a cappella of "Seasons". The cover sleeve features several clones of Hamasaki, representing an audience. The cover shoot was photographed by Japanese photographer Toru Kumazawa with a total off seven make–up and hair assistants. Shinichi Hara had directed the cover sleeve and has been Hamasaki's creative director for promotional work and began collaborating with her in 1998. His final work was directing the sleeve for Hamasaki's 2009 single "Sunrise/Sunset (Love Is All)". A digital release of the single was released in Australia, New Zealand, North America and the United Kingdom. A vinyl was released by Rhythm Republic Records and was distributed in Japan only. "Audience" has featured on three greatest hits compilation albums by Hamasaki including the white deluxe edition of A Best 2 (2007), A Complete: All Singles (2008) and A Summer Best (2012).

No music video was shot for the single. Only a video commercial for the single was aired in Japan. This became Hamasaki's first single to not feature a music video; her next single to not feature a music video was her 2001 single "Unite!". (Note: "Audience" was her first stand–alone single to not feature a music video and does not include her 1999 EP A. A featured "Monochrome", "Too Late", "Trauma" and "End roll" and didn't receive a music video for each track, making it her first EP to not feature music videos. This repeated on H (2002), but her third EP & did for all tracks. To date, Hamasaki has four solo singles that have no music videos: "Audience", "Unite!", "Blossom" and "Terminal".)

== Reception ==
"Audience" received favorable reviews from most music critics. Alexey Eremenko, who had written her extended biography at Allmusic, highlighted the song as an album and career stand out. A reviewer for CDJournal was positive towards the track, commending the production and calling it “fun” but “aggressive” Hamasaki hosted an online voting poll for fans to choose their favorite tracks to be featured on her Ayumi Hamasaki 15th Anniversary Tour Best Live Tour. As a result, "Audience" were featured on the list.

"Audience" debuted at number three on the Japanese Count Down TV chart. The song was unable to pass Misia's single "Everything" and Southern All Stars' single "Blue in Green". It fell to number eight the next week. It fell to sixteen in its third week, and fell at number thirty and forty-six in its fourth and fifth week, respectively. The song fell outside the top fifty at number fifty-four and fell to seventy-nine. "Audience" debuted at number two on the Oricon Singles Chart and lasted eight weeks. In the 2000 annual Count Down TV chart, "Audience" was placed at ninety-two.

"Audience" was certified gold by the Recording Industry Association of Japan (RIAJ) for shipment of 200,000 units. "Audience" resulted in the lowest selling single off Duty, with only the lead "trilogy" singles selling over 500,000 units in Japan. Despite this result, "Audience" now remains Hamasaki's second best selling limited edition single to date with sales over 293,000 units, just behind "Fly High" which sold 300,000 units. "Audience" is her twenty–seventh best selling single.

== Live performances ==
Hamasaki has performed "Audience" in all of her New Years countdown concerts up until the Ayumi Hamasaki Countdown Live 2006–2007 A, which became the song's last live performance at the countdown shows. (Note: All New Years concert links are listed below; 2000–2001 A, 2001–2002, 2002–2003, 2004–2005, 2005–2006, and 2006–2007.) Additionally, Hamasaki has performed "Audience" twice in her involvement with Avex Trax's concert A Nation, being performed in 2006 and the last performance being held in 2008.

"Audience" has also been featured on several of Hamasaki's national and international tours that has spread throughout many Asian territories. The song had made its debut tour performance on Hamasaki's 2001 Ayumi Hamasaki Dome Tour 2001 A. Ever since the song's debut performance, "Audience" has appeared on several of Hamasaki's arena tours including Ayumi Hamasaki Arena Tour 2002 A, 2002 Stadium Tour and 2005 My Story Tour. The song's last live performance was her 2014 Ayumi Hamasaki PREMIUM SHOWCASE: Feel the love, in which was supported by her 2014 studio album Colours. (Note: All arena tours appearances are listed below; Stadium Tour 2002, Arena Tour 2006, Tour of Secret, and the final performance from Premium Showcase: Feel the Love.)

== Personnel ==
Credits adapted from the single's liner notes.

=== Song credits ===
- Ayumi Hamasaki – songwriting, vocal production
- Dai Nagao – composition
- Yasuyuki Tomita – A&R
- Shigeo Miyamoto – mastering, engineering
- Shinji Hayashi – additional production
- Max Matsuura – executive producer, vocal production, additional production

=== Cover credits ===
- Shinichi Hara – art direction
- Shigeru Kasai and Takuma Noriage – design
- Naoki Ueda – creative coordinator
- Toru Kumazawa – photographer
- Koji Matsumoto – fashion director
- Hiroyuki Ishii and Takako Mishima – stylist
- CHIKA – hair assistant and make–up stylist
- Kanako Miura – nail artist

== Track listing ==
All lyrics written by Ayumi Hamasaki.

CD single
No.	Title	Length
1.	"Audience" (Dave Ford Mix)	4:08
2.	"Surreal" (Sample Madness Remix)	5:31
3.	"Audience" (Keith Litman's Radio Mix)	3:53
4.	"Audience" (Feelin' U Mix)	6:29
5.	"Audience" (GENIUS ROCK Big Beat Mix)	5:35
6.	"Audience" (Paranoid Android Mix)	5:38
7.	"Audience" (Scud Formant Mix)	5:45
8.	"Audience" (HAL'S 2000 Mix)	4:16
9.	"Audience" (Dub's Floor Remix Transport 004)	8:37
10.	"Audience" (Dave Ford Mix (Instrumental))	4:08
11.	"Seasons" (Vocal Track)	2:59

7" Vinyl
No.	Title	Length
1.	"Audience" (Keith Litman's Radio Mix)	3:53
2.	"Surreal" (Sample Madness Remix)	5:31
3.	"Audience" (Dave Ford Mix)	4:08

== Charts, peaks and positions ==
=== Weekly charts ===
Chart (2000)	Peak position
Japan Weekly Chart (Oricon)	2
Japan Count Down TV Chart (TBS)	3
Japan Annual Count Down TV Yearly Chart (TBS)	92

=== Certification ===
Region	Certification	Certified units/sales
Japan (RIAJ)	Gold	200,000^{^}
^{^} Shipments figures based on certification alone.

== Release history ==
List of release dates by region, including format details, and record label
Country	Date	Format	Label	Version
Japan	November 1, 2000	Compact disc	Avex Trax	Album and Single Version
Japan	November 1, 2000	Vinyl	Avex Trax	Album and Single Version
Japan	N/A	Digital download	Avex Trax	Album and Single Version
