= List of Oricon number-one albums of 2007 =

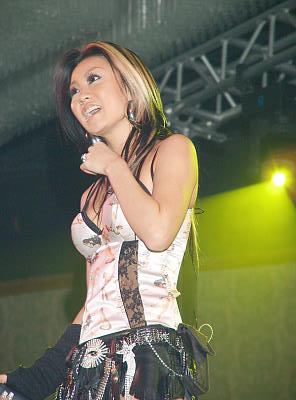
R&B singer Kumi Koda's sixth studio album, Black Cherry, is the longest-running number-one album of 2007.

The highest-selling albums and mini-albums in Japan are ranked in the Oricon Weekly Chart, which is published by Oricon Style magazine. The data are compiled by Oricon based on each album's weekly physical sales. In 2007, 41 albums reached the peak of the charts.

R&B singer Kumi Koda's Black Cherry had the longest run of 2007. The album stayed atop of the charts for four consecutive weeks becoming the first female studio album since Ayumi Hamasaki's Duty in 2000. Korean pop singer BoA's Made in Twenty (20) made her the second artist after Ayumi Hamasaki to have five constructive number-one studio albums since her debut. Ayumi Hamasaki simultaneously released her greatest hits collection A Best 2; which consists of two albums A Best 2: White and A Best 2: Black. The former took the number-one spot while the latter took #2, making Hamasaki the first female artist in thirty-six years to take the Top two spots on the charts.

American pop group Backstreet Boys' Unbreakable became the first album of a foreign male group to top the Oricon for two consecutive weeks since O-Zone's DiscO-Zone in 2005. Other artists who had an extended run on the charts include Kaela Kimura, Mr. Children, Yui, Mariya Takeuchi, Namie Amuro, Sukima Switch, Hideaki Tokunaga, and Ketsumeishi. Folk rock singer Kazumasa Oda's Jiko Best 2 makes him the oldest artist, at 60 years old, to have a number-one album on the chart. Canadian pop punk singer Avril Lavigne's The Best Damn Thing made her the first foreign artist to sell a million copies since her debut album.

The best-selling album overall of 2008 was Mr. Children's Home which sold over 1,181,000 copies. The second best-selling album was Koda's Black Cherry, which sold 1,022,000 copies, followed by Kobukuro's All Singles Best, which was released September 2006 selling over 850,000 copies. The fourth- and fifth-best-selling albums was Lavigne's The Best Damn Thing and Hamasaki's A Best 2: White respectively. The Best Damn Thing sold 840,000 while A Best 2: White sold 716,000 copies.

== Chart history ==
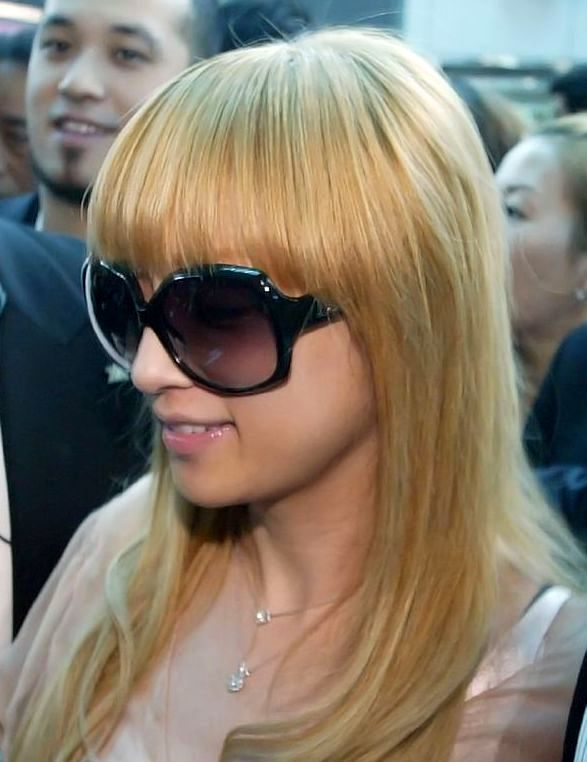
Pop singer Ayumi Hamasaki's greatest hits collection A Best 2: White and A Best 2: Black made Hamasaki the first female artist to have both albums hold the Top two positions in 36 years.

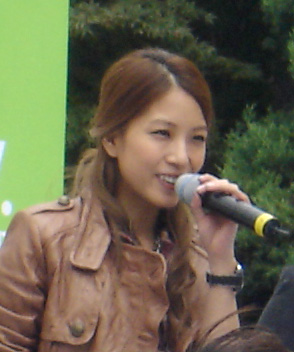
Pop singer BoA became the second artist to have five consecutive number-one albums.

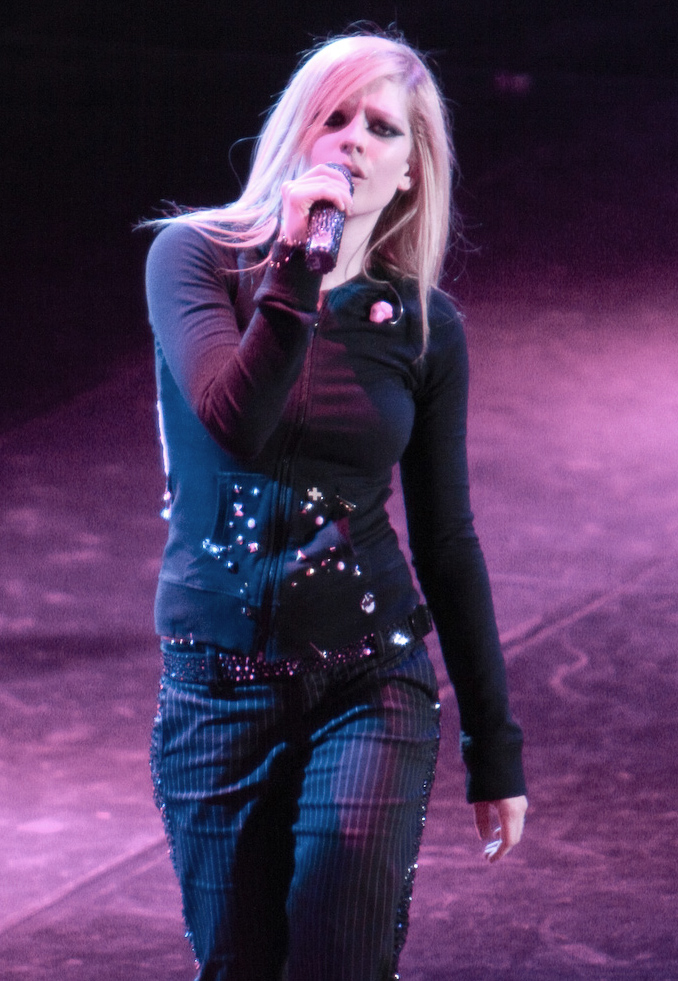
Punk-rock singer Avril Lavigne is the first and only foreign artist who sold a million copies from her first three albums in Japan.

| Issue Date | Song | Artist(s) | Reference(s) |
|---|---|---|---|
| January 1 | Black Cherry | Kumi Koda | |
| January 15 | Black Cherry | Kumi Koda | |
| January 22 | Black Cherry | Kumi Koda | |
| January 29 | Made in Twenty (20) | BoA | |
| February 5 | Heart | Yuna Ito | |
| February 12 | Love Is Beautiful | Glay | |
| February 19 | Scratch | Kaela Kimura | |
| February 26 | Scratch | Kaela Kimura | |
| March 5 | Heisei Fūzoku | Ringo Shiina, Neko Saito | |
| March 12 | A Best 2: White | Ayumi Hamasaki | |
| March 19 | Exile Evolution | Exile | |
| March 26 | Home | Mr. Children | |
| April 2 | Home | Mr. Children | |
| April 9 | Ai am Best | Ai Otsuka | |
| April 16 | Can't Buy My Love | Yui | |
| April 23 | Can't Buy My Love | Yui | |
| April 30 | Cartoon KAT-TUN II You | KAT-TUN | |
| May 7 | The Best Damn Thing | Avril Lavigne | |
| May 14 | The Best of Mihimaru GT | Mihimaru GT | |
| May 21 | B-Side | Mr. Children | |
| May 28 | Minutes to Midnight | Linkin Park | |
| June 4 | Denim | Mariya Takeuchi | |
| June 11 | Denim | Mariya Takeuchi | |
| June 18 | KJ2 Zukkoke Daidassō | Kanjani Eight | |
| June 25 | Lost Highway | Bon Jovi | |
| July 2 | All Yours | Crystal Kay | |
| July 9 | Play | Namie Amuro | |
| July 16 | Play | Namie Amuro | |
| July 23 | Time | Arashi | |
| July 30 | 39 | KinKi Kids | |
| August 6 | Range | Orange Range | |
| August 13 | Greatest Hits | Sukima Switch | |
| August 20 | Greatest Hits | Sukima Switch | |
| August 27 | Vocalist 3 | Hideaki Tokunaga | |
| September 3 | Vocalist 3 | Hideaki Tokunaga | |
| September 10 | Ketsunopolis 5 | Ketsumeishi | |
| September 17 | Ketsunopolis 5 | Ketsumeishi | |
| September 24 | Voyager | V6 | |
| October 1 | Today | Angela Aki | |
| October 8 | Love Piece | Ai Otsuka | |
| October 15 | Five-star | Yuki | |
| October 22 | SazanamiCD | Spitz | |
| October 29 | TackeyTsuba Best | Tackey & Tsubasa | |
| November 5 | Unbreakable | Backstreet Boys | |
| November 12 | Unbreakable | Backstreet Boys | |
| November 19 | Pacific | NEWS | |
| November 26 | Phi | KinKi Kids | |
| December 3 | Kiss | L'Arc-en-Ciel | |
| December 10 | Jiko Best 2 | Kazumasa Oda | |
| December 17 | Action | B'z | |
| December 24 | Exile Love | Exile | |
| December 31 | 5296 | Kobukuro | |
