= Uri Nakayama =

Uri Nakayama 中山 うり
- Also known as: Uri
- Born: (Nakayama Uri)中山 うり; January 9, 1981 (age 45)
- Origin: Saitama, Japan
- Genres: Pop, jazz
- Occupations: Singer-songwriter, hairdresser
- Instruments: Vocal, accordion, trumpet, guitar
- Years active: 2004–present
- Label: Sony Music Entertainment International
- Website: http://www.worldapart.co.jp/uri/ (in Japanese)

Uri Nakayama (中山 うり, Nakayama Uri; born January 9, 1981) is a female singer-songwriter and hairdresser in Japan.

== Musical characteristics ==
Nakayama, in addition to singing, plays the accordion, trumpet, and guitar. When performing live, she is usually accompanied by four supporting members playing guitar, bass, drums and percussion. Additional support members playing trumpet, saxophone, trombone, tuba, and violin join the band during live tours and rock festivals.

Nakayama's music is a blend of world accordion music, Gypsy Jazz, Musette, and Tango. She sings with a low, warm, smooth and soft voice. Her CDs are categorized as J-pop in CD shops, and as jazz by iTunes in Japan.

Most of Nakayama's lyrics are in Japanese; a few songs are instrumental or feature scat singing. Her lyrics frequently evoke nostalgic scenes, festivals, harbor towns, and sunsets as lyrical motifs. She sings some cover versions of Japanese folk music, which are thought to have influenced her original works.

== Discography ==
=== Singles ===
- 2008: "Yuyakezora ni Matenrou" (夕焼け空に摩天楼, Skyscraper in Sunset) – Did not chart.
- 2009: "Wonderful" (ワンダフル, Wandafuru) – Did not chart.

=== Studio albums ===
- 2006: Uri Nakayama-EP (EP, iTunes release only)
- 2006: Moons, Stars, and Dreams (Live album, iTunes release only)
- 2007: DoReMiFa – peaked at No. 137.
- 2007: Etranger (エトランゼ, Etoranze) – peaked at No. 196.
- 2008: Natsu-Matsuri Azayaka ni (夏祭り鮮やかに) (extended play) – peaked at No. 279.
- 2008: Que Sera (ケセラ, Ke Sera) – peaked at No. 137.
- 2010: 7 Colors (セブンカラーズ, Seben Karāzu) (Cover album)
- 2011: Viva – released February 16, 2011

=== Concert DVDs ===
- 2009: LE TOUR DE QUESERA 2008
