= A Song Is Born (song) =

2001 single by Ayumi Hamasaki and Keiko

Single by Ayumi Hamasaki & Keiko

from the album Song Nation and I Am...
- Released: 12 December 2001
- Genre: Synthpop
- Length: 6:16
- Label: Avex Trax
- Songwriters: Tetsuya Komuro (music); Ayumi Hamasaki (lyrics)
- Producers: Tetsuya Komuro; Max Matsuura

Ayumi Hamasaki singles chronology
"Dearest" (2001)	"A Song Is Born" (2001)	"Daybreak" (2002)

Keiko singles chronology
"On the Way to You" (2000)	"A Song Is Born" (2001)	"Be True" (2003)

"A Song Is Born" was a collaboration between Ayumi Hamasaki and Keiko (Globe) for the Song Nation non-profit project by Avex, which was created to raise funds to help the victims of the 9/11 attacks on the World Trade Center.

The song was composed by Tetsuya Komuro, but unlike the other two single releases of the project, "The Meaning of Peace" (a duet between BoA and Kumi Koda) and "Lovin' It" (a duet between Namie Amuro and Verbal of M-Flo), the lyrics were written by Ayumi Hamasaki. Hamasaki went on to record a solo version on this song, which appeared on her fourth studio album, I am....

== Track listing ==
1. "A Song Is Born" (Original Mix)
2. "A Song Is Born" (TV Mix)

== Charts ==
Oricon Sales Chart (Japan)

Release	Chart	Peak position	First week sales	Sales total	Chart run
12 December 2001	Oricon Daily Singles Chart	1			
12 December 2001	Oricon Weekly Singles Chart	1	200,110	441,410	10 Weeks
12 December 2001	Oricon Yearly Singles Chart	18			
