= Cyber Trance Presents Ayu Trance =

Remix album by Ayumi Hamasaki

Remix album by Ayumi Hamasaki
- Released: September 27, 2001
- Genre: Trance
- Length: 56:28
- Label: Avex Trax

Ayumi Hamasaki chronology
Super Eurobeat Presents Ayu-ro Mix 2 (2001)	Cyber Trance Presents Ayu Trance (2001)	Ayu-mi-x 4 + Selection Non-Stop Mega Mix Version (2001)

Cyber Trance Presents Ayu Trance is a remix album by Ayumi Hamasaki that contains remixes in the trance genre. The album was released on September 27, 2001.

On October 8, 2021, the album was rereleased as Cyber Trance Presents Ayu Trance -COMPLETE EDITION- on music streaming services to celebrate the 20th anniversary of its release. This edition contains previously unreleased remix versions.

== Tracklisting (2001 Version) ==
1. Depend on You (Svenson & Gielen Remix)
2. M (Above & Beyond Remix)
3. Trauma (JamX & De Leon's DuMonde Remix)
4. Unite! (Airwave Remix)
5. Surreal (Marc et Claude Remix)
6. Audience (Darren Tate Remix)
7. Fly High (VooDoo & Serano Remix)
8. Immature (Koglin & Heath Remix)
9. Evolution (Goldenscan Remix)
10. Kanariya (System F Remix)
11. Appears (Armin van Buuren Remix)
12. Boys & Girls (Push Remix)
13. Unite! (Moogwai Remix)
14. A Song for XX (Ferry Corsten Chilled Mix)

== Chart positions ==
Chart (2001)	Peak position
Japan Oricon	3

- Total Sales: 302,000 (Japan)
