= I Am... (Ayumi Hamasaki album) =

Studio album by Ayumi Hamasaki
- Released: January 1, 2002
- Recorded: 2000–2001
- Studios: Prime Sound Studio (Tokyo); Studio Sound Dali (Tokyo); Now-a-Days Attic (Tokyo); Electric Sheep Studios; Avex Studio (Tokyo); Sony Music Studios (Tokyo)
- Genres: J-pop; rock; dance
- Length: 70:35
- Language: Japanese
- Label: Avex Trax
- Producers: Max Matsuura; Ferry Corsten

Ayumi Hamasaki chronology
A Best (2001)	I Am... (2002)	Rainbow (2002)

Singles from I Am...
- 1. "M" Released: December 13, 2000; 2. "Evolution" Released: January 31, 2001; 3. "Never Ever" Released: March 7, 2001; 4. "Endless Sorrow" Released: May 16, 2001; 5. "Unite!" Released: July 11, 2001; 6. "Dearest" Released: September 27, 2001; 7. "A Song Is Born" Released: December 12, 2001; 8. "Daybreak" Released: March 6, 2002; 9. "Connected" Released: April 7, 2003

I Am... is the fourth studio album by Japanese recording artist Ayumi Hamasaki. It was released on January 1, 2002 by Avex Trax and was distributed throughout Asia in both physical and digital formats. Hamasaki enlisted long-time collaborator Max Matsuura to assist with the album's creation, and was inspired by the events of the September 11, 2001 attacks to emphasise lighter themes in contrast to her previous work.

I Am... is a J-Pop record with a diverse range of sounds including rock, heavy metal, trance, and dance music. Lyrically, the album touches on themes of hope, peace and love. The album received positive reviews from music critics for its musical direction and Hamasaki's emotional presence, with some citing the album as one of her best. Commercially, I Am... was a success in Japan, reaching number one on the Oricon Albums Chart. It was certified double million by the Recording Industry Association of Japan (RIAJ) for exceeding two million unit shipments, and is ranked as the fifty-fifth highest-selling album in that region.

I Am... spawned various singles in Japan and internationally; two singles, "M" and "Evolution", sold well over one million units in Japan. To promote I Am..., various songs from the record were promoted in commercial and campaigns in Japan. Moreover, Hamasaki embarked on two concert tours in the same region: her 2002 arena tour, and her 2002 stadium tour. Both tours were commemorated with live DVD releases that were commercially success in the country.

== Background and development ==
“Overall, I felt like I was throwing my true self into the album, so I am... naturally fit. But that’s not the only reason. In 'Daybreak', there’s a line: ♪Blaming this era, losing my face.♪ I feel like we live in a time where there are so many 'faceless people'—people without individuality, all the same. And that’s really sad.”

— Hamasaki explaining why she named the album I Am....

On September 28, 2000, Ayumi Hamasaki released her third studio album Duty. It was a critical success upon its release, partially noted for her songwriting abilities and overall production standard. It became Hamasaki's best-selling studio album in Japan, debuting at number one on the Oricon Albums Chart and selling over two million copies. To promote the record, Hamasaki embarked on her 2000 concert tour and eventually her annual Live Countdown concert tour.

Work on new music began after the promotion for Duty concluded, with the release of her single "M" in December 2000. Initially dissatisfied with the original results her team had given her for the track "M," Hamasaki decided to compose the tune herself. She was pleased with the final sound, so she concentrated on writing and producing new material for the album under the alias Crea. During the early stages of development, Hamasaki's record label Avex Trax planned to release a musical retrospective of the singer's career. Despite Hamasaki's refusal, Avex Trax released her greatest hits album A Best in March 2001 as a "competitive strategy" against the release of Japanese recording artist Hikaru Utada's album Distance. Despite its massive commercial success in Japan at the time, this resulted in a minor pause in her new material.

Unlike her previous albums, Hamasaki did not begin with a clear theme when making I Am... due to limited production time. Instead, she focused on shaping sounds she wanted to express. Midway through, she realized the album lacked unity, which led her to identify “sharing freedom and loneliness” (a lyric from Naturally) as the underlying concept. Hamasaki told Time that the September 11, 2001 attacks in New York City affected her emotionally. As a result, she decided to concentrate on "lighter themes" like faith and peace. Along with this decision, Hamasaki decided to broaden her market by performing outside of Japan; in 2002, she made her international debut at the MTV Asia Awards in Singapore.

== Composition ==
I Am... is a J-Pop record that incorporates various sounds such as rock, heavy metal, trance, dance, electronic music, and acoustic-driven instrumentation. Writing for AllMusic, Neil Z. Yeung said the record features more "mature content and thrilling genre experimentation". He also noted that the second half of the record has a more "midtempo fare...". Michael McCarthy from Lollipop Magazine noted the variety of sounds and emotional presence from Hamasaki, writing that each track "fits together nicely." The album was produced by long-time collaborator Max Matsuura, and all songs were written by Hamasaki. Tasuku, CMJK, Hal, Dai Nagao (under the alias D.A.I.) and Naoto Suzuki are among the composers and arrangers on the album, while Hamasaki is credited as a composer on ten of the songs.

The album begins with the midtempo title track, opening with acapella and progresses with guitar riffs. "Opening Run" is one of two interludes, and its composition incorporates a breakbeat-inspired sound. "Connected" was produced by Dutch DJ Ferry Corsten, and incorporates a fast trance-inspired beat. "Unite!" and "Evolution" are two fast-paced rock songs with keyboard and piano instrumentation, respectively, while "Naturally" has a "melancholic melody." "Never Ever" is a fast-paced rock song with a guitar solo, while "Still Alone" is a slower rock-influenced track.

"Daybreak" is composed differently than its single release, opting for a mid-tempo rock sound, while "Taskinlude" is the second of two interludes featured on the album. "M" is a "emotionally impactful" song, with the title "M" standing for Maria. A solo version of "A Song Is Born" was included on I Am..., omitting guest vocals by Globe lead vocalist Keiko from the single release. "Dearest" and "No More Words" are slow ballads with different instrumentation, while an alternate version of "Endless Sorrow" titled "Gone With the Wind" was included on the album; a hidden track titled "Flower Garden" is placed at the end of "Endless Sorrow".

== Release and artwork ==
"I had a completely different idea for the cover at first. We'd already reserved the space, decided the hair and makeup and everything. But after the incident, as is typical of me, I suddenly changed my mind. I knew it wasn't the time for gaudiness, for elaborate sets and costumes. It sounds odd coming from me, but I realize what I say and how I look has a great impact."

— Hamasaki talking about the photoshoot for I Am....

I Am... was released on January 1, 2002, her fourth studio album overall. The album contains 16 songs totalling over 70 minutes in length, and was released in various countries in Asia, with Avex Trax releasing it in China, Hong Kong, and Indonesia, and S.M. Entertainment releasing it in South Korea. In 2012, the album was reissued by Avex Trax in a Playbutton format.

The album title I am... reflects Hamasaki’s intention to present her unfiltered self. She also linked it to themes of individuality, contrasting with what she described as an era of “faceless people” lacking uniqueness. She emphasized the importance of leaving one’s “face” (individuality) in creative works. The ellipsis (“...”) in the title was meant to prompt listeners to reflect on their own identity (“I am… what?”).

"Since the title is I am..., I didn’t want anything too decorated from the start. I thought it would be better to keep it simple, without unnecessary elements. So I went for a 'natural' feel."

— Hamasaki talking about the album cover for I Am....

Toru Kumazawa shot the album cover and photoshoot, which Hamasaki described as having a "darker" vibe than her previous work with him. However, in light of the September 11, 2001, attacks and the subsequent shift in musical direction, she arranged for another shoot with Kumazawa. The finished piece depicted Hamasaki in an outfit covered in leaves and vines, with a dove perched on his shoulder to convey a symbolic message of peace and hope.. She described the overall vibe of the photoshoot as a "peace muse". The cover was intentionally kept simple and natural, avoiding decoration. Hamasaki associated “natural” with an image of the Earth at the time of creation — peaceful and unspoiled.

== Promotion ==
=== Singles and other songs ===
Eight singles were released in Japan to promote I Am.... "M" was released the album's lead single on December 13, 2000, through Avex Trax. The song peaked at number one on the Oricon Singles Chart, and was certified million by the Recording Industry Association of Japan (RIAJ) for exceeding one million unit shipments. The albums second single, "Evolution", was released on January 31, 2001, through Avex Trax. It peaked at number one on the Oricon Singles Chart, and was also certified million in Japan. "Never Ever" was released as the albums third single by Avex Trax on March 7, 2001. The song peaked at number one on the Oricon Singles Chart, and was certified double platinum for exceeding shipments of 500,000 units. "Endless Sorrow" was released as the albums fourth single on May 16, 2001, and peaked at number one on the Oricon Singles Chart, achieving a double platinum certification in the country.

The album's fifth single, "Unite!", was released on July 7, 2001, through Avex Trax. It was her 23rd single released and the sixth single released in Germany. It peaked at number one in the country, and was certified Platinum for exceeding sales of 400,000 units. "Dearest" was released as the sixth single on September 27, 2001, and peaked at number one in Japan. Additionally, the track received a double platinum certification in the region. "A Song Is Born", featuring Globe vocalist Keiko, served as a charity record to the Song Nation soundtrack in order to help raise funds for the victims of the September 11 attacks. The song peaked at number one in Japan, and was certified Platinum in the region. "Daybreak" was released as the albums eighth and final regional single on March 6, 2002. It peaked at number two on the Oricon Singles Chart, achieving a gold certification for shipment of 200,000 units in the country.

A few songs on I Am... were remixed and released in different regions outside of Japan. "M" was the first remix single released under the pseudonym Ayu. It was re-released in the United Kingdom and parts of Europe, complete with a music video featuring the remix version by Above & Beyond. The Razor's Club mix of "Evolution" was released on vinyl in the United States in August 2001. "Connected" was released in 2002 as a stand-alone single in Germany and Belgium, and featured various remixes. Two CD single's featuring remixes of the album track "Naturally" and the single "Unite!" were issued in Germany, Austria and Switzerland in 2004 and 2005, respectively.

=== Concert tours ===
Hamasaki embarked on three different concert tours in Japan to promote I Am.... The first was her 2001-2002 Countdown Live debut on December 31, 2001 at Tokyo's National Yoyogi Stadium First Gymnasium. The show, which featured various album tracks, was filmed and released in conjunction with Hamasaki's box set Ayumi Hamasaki Complete Live Box A (2003). Her 2002 Arena Tour began in her home prefecture of Fukuoka in April 2002 and ended in Yokohama in June of that year. On January 29, 2003, a live release was made available. Her 2002 Stadium Tour began in Fukuoka in early July 2002 and ended in Tokyo at the end of the month. A live release, like its predecessor, was released on the same date of January 29, 2003.

2001-2002 Countdown Live track list
1. "Opening Run"
2. "Connected"
3. "Unite!"
4. "Surreal"
5. "Never Ever"
6. "Fly High"
7. "Boys & Girls"
8. "Evolution"
9. "A Song Is Born"
10. "Audience"
11. "Dearest"
12. "Endless Sorrow" (Gone with the Wind Ver.)
Ayumi Hamasaki Arena Tour 2002 track list
1. "I Am..."
2. "Opening Run"
3. "Naturally"
4. "Never Ever"
5. "A Song for xx"
6. "Free & Easy"
7. "Evolution"
8. "Audience"
9. "Unite!"
10. "Independent"
11. "Flower Garden"
12. "Trauma"
13. "No More Words"
14. "M"
15. "Dearest"
16. "Daybreak" (Bonus track)
17. "Who..." (Bonus track)
Ayumi Hamasaki Stadium Tour 2002 track list
1. "Unite!"
2. "Fly High"
3. "Evolution"
4. "Medley" ("Whatever", "Too Late", "Monochrome", "End Roll", "Depend on You", "Vogue")
5. "July 1st"
6. "Independent"
7. "Free & Easy"
8. "M"
9. "Surreal"
10. "Hanabi"
11. "Boy & Girls"
12. "Audience"
13. "A Song Is Born"
14. "Flower Garden"
15. "Trauma"
16. "Who..."
17. "Seasons" (Bonus track)

== Reception ==
Professional ratings
Review scores
Source	Rating
AllMusic	4.5/5 stars
Lollipop Magazine	(positive)
Sputnikmusic	4/5 stars

I Am... received positive reviews from music critics. Neil Z. Yeung of AllMusic gave the album four and a half stars, calling it one of Hamasaki's best works. Z. Yeung praised Hamasaki's songwriting abilities and overall emotional presence, citing "M" as an example, and stated that she was back "in full force." He chose the title track, "Connected," "Evolution," and "M" as album highlights.

Michael McCarthy from Lollipop expresses similar sentiments about Hamasaki's involvement and emotional presence, stating "when she sings ballads, Hamasaki’s delivery is intense and emotional and the music is never generic... Yet all of these songs, which Hamasaki wrote and composed herself, fit together nicely." Sputnikmusic gave the album 4.0/5 (“excellent”). The reviewer considered it one of Hamasaki’s best albums, particularly praising its transition from the synth-pop emphasis of her earlier work toward a more guitar-driven pop-rock sound and its use of real instrumentation.

Commercially, I Am... was a huge success. I Am... was the first album of 2002 to top the Oricon Albums Chart, marking Hamasaki's fourth consecutive studio album to do so. The album sold 1,751,360 units in its first week, setting a record for the year's fastest-selling album until it was surpassed several months later by Japanese singer Hikaru Utada's album Deep River. It stayed at number two for the next two weeks, logging sales of 186,780 copies in its second charting week and 104,780 copies in its third week. I Am... spent a total of six weeks in the top ten and 27 weeks in the top 300 on the chart. By the end of the year, it was the country's second best-selling record, just behind Deep Diver, with over 2.3 million units sold. The album was certified double million by the Recording Industry Association of Japan (RIAJ) for shipments of two million units. In Taiwan, the album was certified by the Recording Industry Foundation in Taiwan (RIT), and sold 114,413 units in the region. Since its release, I am... has ranked as the fifty-fifth best selling album of all time in Japan.

== Track listing ==
All lyrics are written by Ayumi Hamasaki.

No.	Title	Music	Arranger(s)	Length
1.	"I Am..."	Ayumi Hamasaki (Note: Crea is the pseudonym of Ayumi Hamasaki.)	Tadashi Kikuchi	5:31
2.	"Opening Run" (Instrumental)	CMJK	CMJK	0:57
3.	"Connected"	Ferry Corsten	Corsten	3:19
4.	"Unite!"	Hamasaki	Hal	4:59
5.	"Evolution"	Hamasaki	Hal	4:40
6.	"Naturally"	Hamasaki	CMJK	4:16
7.	"Never Ever"	Hamasaki	Chokkaku	4:40
8.	"Still Alone"	Hamasaki	CMJK	5:54
9.	"Daybreak"	Hamasaki, D.A.I; Junichi Matsuda	Tasuku	4:48
10.	"Taskinlude" (Instrumental)	Tasuku	Tasuku	1:20
11.	"M"	Hamasaki	Hal	4:26
12.	"A Song Is Born"	Tetsuya Komuro	Komuro	6:16
13.	"Dearest"	Hamasaki; D.A.I.	Naoto Suzuki	5:32
14.	"No More Words"	Hamasaki; D.A.I.	Suzuki; Tasuki	5:41
15.	"Endless Sorrow" (Gone with the Wind ver.)	Hamasaki	CMJK	5:12
16.	"Flower Garden" (hidden track)	Hamasaki; D.A.I.		2:38

== Personnel ==
Personnel details were sourced from I Am...'s liner notes booklet.

Visuals and imagery

- Sinichi Hara - art direction
- Shingeru Kasai - packaging
- Naoki Ueda - creative coordinator
- Shinuchi Takahashi - quality control
- Toru Kumazawa - photographer

Musicians

- Kiyofumi Onoda - bass
- Kiku - guitar, keyboards
- CMJK - guitar, keyboards
- Hal - Keyboards
- Naoya Akimoto - guitar
- Chokkaku - guitar, keyboards
- Tasuku - bass, guitar, keyboards
- Tetsuya Komuro - arrangement
- Junko Hirotani - backing vocals
- Naoki Hayashibe - guitar

Technical and production

- Ayumi Hamasaki - composer
- Tadashi Kikuchi - arrangement
- Tasuku - arrangement
- Yasuyuki Tomita - A&R
- Hiroaki Ito - coordinators
- Kazuki Muraishi - coordinators
- Noritoshi Fujimoto - coordinators
- Shigeru Kajita - coordinators
- Yumi Kobayashi - coordinators
- Atsushi Yamamoto - engineer
- Ryosuke Kataoka - engineer
- Takayuki Furuta - engineer
- Taketoshi Nakauchi - engineer
- Yukie Sugimoto - engineer
- Yutaka Yamamoto - engineer
- Atsushi Hattori - audio mixer
- Ferry Corsten - audio mixer, producer, composer
- Koji Morimoto - audio mixer
- Noriki Inada - audio mixer
- Satoshi Kumasaka - audio mixer
- Yasuo Matsumoto - audio mixer
- Yuka Akiyama - production assistant
- Naoto Suzuki - sound producer
- Atsushi Hattori - recording assistant
- Motohiro Tsuji - recording assistant
- Noriki Inada - recording assistant
- Satoshi Kumasaka - recording assistant
- D.A.I. - composer
- Junichi Matsuda - composer

== Charts ==
=== Weekly charts ===
Chart (2002)	Peak position
Japanese Albums (Oricon)	1
Singaporean Albums (RIAS)	3

=== Monthly charts ===
Chart (2002)	Peak position
Japanese Albums (Oricon)	1

=== Year-end charts ===
Chart (2002)	Position
Japanese Albums (Oricon)	2

=== Decade-end charts ===
Chart (2000–2009)	Position
Japanese Albums (Oricon)	17

=== All-time chart ===
Chart	Position
Japanese Albums (Oricon)	55

== Certifications ==
Region	Certification	Certified units/sales
Japan (RIAJ)	2× Million	2,308,112
Taiwan (RIT)	3× Platinum+Gold	114,413

== Release history ==
Region	Date	Format	Label
Japan	January 1, 2002	CD; DVD; digital download	Avex Trax
Worldwide	January 1, 2002	Digital download	Avex Trax
China	January 2002	CD	Avex Trax
Hong Kong	January 2002	CD	Avex Trax
Indonesia	January 2002	CD	Avex Trax
South Korea	January 2002	CD	SM Entertainment
Japan	2012	Playbutton	Avex Trax

== See also ==
- List of Oricon number-one albums of 2002
