= Never Ever (Ayumi Hamasaki song) =

Single by Ayumi Hamasaki

from the album I am...
- Released: March 7, 2001
- Genre: Pop rock; alternative rock
- Length: 50:52
- Label: Avex Trax
- Songwriters: Ayumi Hamasaki (lyrics); CREA (music)
- Producer: Max Matsuura

Ayumi Hamasaki singles chronology
"Evolution" (2001)	"Never Ever" (2001)	"Endless Sorrow" (2001)

Promotional Video
- "Never Ever" on YouTube

"Never Ever" is the twenty-first single by Ayumi Hamasaki, released on March 7, 2001. This is her third single in a row to be composed by herself. In mid-October 2007, the third track on this single "Seasons (H-H Remix)", six and a half years after its release, appeared as the third most downloaded song in Japan for that time, according to mu-mo.

== Information ==
"Never Ever" was released only three weeks before her first compilation album, A Best. Like the latter album, she was forced by her record label, avex, to release this single. Although she had already incorporated pop-rock music in her work, this song is considered as her first real attempt to pop-rock music.

== Commercial endorsements ==
"Never Ever" was used in a commercial for the Kirin Supli drinks. Hamasaki appeared in the TV ad.

== Track listing ==
1. "Never Ever" (Original Mix) – 4:41
2. "Never Ever" (Yuta's prayer mix)
3. "Seasons (H-H Remix)"
4. "Never Ever" (Project O.T. MIX)
5. "Never Ever" (Laugh & Peace MIX)
6. "Never Ever" (Empty Pot Shuttlecock Wood)
7. "Evolution" (Ayu Can Hear U Mix)
8. "Never Ever" (nicely nice hot stab remix)
9. "Never Ever" (tears of aquarius mix)
10. "Never Ever" (Original Mix -Instrumental-) – 4:41

== Live performances ==
- March 9, 200: Music Station
- March 10, 2001: CountDown TV
- March 19, 2001: Hey! Hey! Hey!

== Charts ==
Oricon Sales Chart (Japan)

Release	Chart	Peak position	First week sales	Sales total	Chart run
7 March 2001	Oricon Daily Singles Chart	1			
7 March 2001	Oricon Weekly Singles Chart	1	423,480	757,000	12
7 March 2001	Oricon Yearly Singles Chart	16			

- RIAJ certification: 3× Platinum
