= Evolution (Ayumi Hamasaki song) =

Single by Ayumi Hamasaki

from the album I Am...
- Released: January 31, 2001
- Recorded: 2000
- Genre: Alt-rock; electronic dance
- Length: 1:02:02
- Label: Avex Trax
- Songwriters: Ayumi Hamasaki (lyrics); Crea (music)
- Producer: Max Matsuura

Ayumi Hamasaki singles chronology
"M" (2000)	"Evolution" (2001)	"Never Ever" (2001)

Official Music Video
- "Evolution" on YouTube

"Evolution" is the 20th single by Japanese recording artist and lyricist Ayumi Hamasaki, released on January 31, 2001, by Avex Trax as the second single from her fourth studio album I Am... (2002).

"Evolution" is a pop rock and alternative rock song with a ballad-esque intro. The song was fully written and composed by Hamasaki herself, under her penned alias Crea. Lyrically, the song talks about happy and sad moments in life. Upon the song's release, "Evolution" received favorable reviews from most music critics who commended the song's musical production and lyrical content, while Hamasaki's vocal delivery received criticism.

Commercially, the song was a commercial success. The song peaked at number one on the Oricon Singles Chart, making it her eighth number one single. After selling over 950,000 units in Japan, the song was certified million by the Recording Industry Association of Japan (RIAJ) for shipments of one million units. The song has sold over one million units worldwide. An accompanying music video was shot by Wataru Takeishi for the single version, which featured Hamasaki inside a televised studio, singing and dancing in front of a live band. In addition, after the release of this work, "Evolution" became Hamasaki's must-sing song in concerts.

== Background and development ==
In late 2000, Hamasaki listened to ten or so demos for her new song "M", but none of them really stood out to her. To speed up the development process, she decided to compose her own song for the first time under the pseudonym Crea. She wrote the song using her Mac computer's composing software Studio Vision. The single received favorable reception from most music critics and achieved huge success in Japan; the song peaked at number one and sold over one million units in Japan according to the Recording Industry Association of Japan (RIAJ). (Note: "M" received a 3× Platinum certification for 1,200,000 copies, however the 3× Platinum threshold was redefined as 750,000 copies in 2003.)

To follow up on the success of "M", "Evolution" was selected as the follow-up single just one month later, which she also took charge in composing herself. Hamasaki said that she chose an aggressive sound for the song due to people labelling her as a "robot" or "doll" before.

== Composition and release ==
"Evolution" was written by Hamasaki herself, like the rest off the I Am... album, and produced by long-time collaborator Max Matsuura. "Evolution" was one out of twelve songs on the parent album to have been composed by her, which was first asserted on "M" after her staff failed to compose a musical composition that she had felt conformable with or suited her songs. The song's arrangement was handled by HΛL, who contributed to arranging the songs "M" and "Unite!" on the parent album. Musically, the song is a pop rock and alternative rock song with a ballad-esque intro, which was heavily compared towards another album track "Unite!". The song's "ballad-inspired intro" was noted as "deceiving" and features Hamasaki "singing way too fast in her choruses."

For the cover artwork, the sleeve was shot by Shinichi Hara, art design was handled by Shigeru Kasai and was officially directed by Yasuyuki Tomita. The cover artwork features Hamasaki holding a microphone and features the text of the single name inprinted with the American flag inside it. The CD single of "Evolution" was released on January 31, 2001, by Avex Trax and was eventually released digitally worldwide. In addition towards the physical release, the single was served on a vinyl release by Rhythm Republic records in Japan, a bonus DVD release and also released a limited edition VHS tape.

== Reception ==
=== Critical reception ===
"Evolution" received favorable reviews from most music critics. Jeff from Random.Access.Reviews had compared both "Evolution" and "Unite!" for sharing similar music structures. He commented "["UNITE!"] brings more J-rock to the forefront, as does ["Evolution"], eventually sounding just like each other [...]" Jeff commented that while the choruses were too fast and powerful, he did conclude "evolution" is a bit more catchy and poppy though, so I'll recommend that one." Greenberg, who had written the extended biography of Hamasaki on the same website, had listed "Evolution" as one of her career standouts. Hamasaki had hosted an online voting poll for fans to choose their favorite tracks to be featured on her Ayumi Hamasaki 15th Anniversary Tour ~Best Live Tour~. As a result, all three songs from H were featured on the list.

=== Commercial response ===
Commercially, the song was a success. "Evolution" debuted at number one on the Oricon Singles Chart, which became Hamasaki's eighth number one in Japan since her 1999 single "Love (Destiny)", which became her first number one. It also debuted at number one on Tokyo Broadcasting System's (TBS) Count Down TV chart during the chart week of February 10, 2001. Initial sales for "Evolution" exceeded 500,000 copies, just like the previous work, with 503,020 copies sold. During the same charting week, Hamasaki's single "M" was at number eight. During the single's second charting week, it fell to number three with 180,630 copies sold, being stalled by KinKi Kids' single "Boku no Senaka ni wa Hane ga Aru" and Mai Kuraki's single "Tsumetai Umi/Start in My Life" at number one and two respectively, and had stalled at number three for two consecutive weeks. The song "Evolution" stayed inside the top forty for eleven weeks, and fell to number forty-five in its twelfth week. The song had left the top fifty and the single's last charting position was at number 100 on its seventeenth week. Two other of Hamasaki's singles featured on that last week, which were "Unite!" and "Endless Sorrow".

"Evolution" sold over 950,000 units in Japan and was certified Million by the Recording Industry Association of Japan (RIAJ) for shipments of one million units within the country. (Note: "evolution" received a 2× Platinum certification for 950,000 copies, however the 2× Platinum threshold was redefined as 500,000 copies in 2003.) The song was also certified gold by the RIAJ for more than 100,000 legal downloads in July 2014, which equivalently tallies the sales to over one million sales in Japan, as of July 2014. "Evolution" became Hamasaki's best-selling single in 2001 onwards until it was surpassed by her 2002 EP "H", which also charted at number one and was the only Japanese single in 2002 to sell over one million units. As of today, "Evolution" is Hamasaki's sixth best selling single in her musical career just behind "H" at five, "Boys & Girls" at four, "M" at three, "Seasons" at two and "A" at one.

In the Japanese Society for Rights of Authors, Composers and Publishers' (JASRAC) ranking of domestic works for royalties, the single "Evolution" ranked ninth in 2001. In 2014, "Evolution" had charted on the Japan Billboard Adult Alternative chart at number 70, thirteen years later after the single's release.

== Promotion ==
Still from the music video showing Hamasaki being directed on set.

The music video for "Evolution" was directed by Wataru Takeishi.

The video starts with Hamasaki being driven to the video shoot for "Evolution". Upon arrival, she is helped out of the limousine by her bodyguard. Throughout the video, both filming and music production equipment can be seen. At various points, Hamasaki can be seen dancing while singing into a wireless microphone; there are also points in the video where she is seen performing as a hologram in front of a band, and places in the video where she is seen being directed by the on-set director and given touch-ups throughout filming. There are also parts in the video showing various staff members, such as film crew. For the shoot, Hamasaki cut her long hair into a short pixie cut and wore a fox tail on her outfit, which became a hot topic.

"Evolution" was used in a TV commercial for a line of Kosé Visee mascara, which featured Hamasaki herself. In 2012, it was used as the theme song for the Japanese film Helter Skelter that starred Erika Sawajiri.

== Track listing ==
=== Single ===
1. Evolution "Original Mix" - 4:42
2. Evolution "Dub's Floor Remix Transport 004" - 7:38
3. Evolution "DJ Remo-Con Remix" - 8:44
4. End of the World "Laugh & Peace Mix" - 6:54
5. Evolution "Boom Bass Ayumix" - 4:06
6. Evolution "Oriental Hot Spa" - 7:18
7. Surreal "Nicely Nice Electron '00 remix" - 5:02
8. Evolution "Huge Terrestrial Birth Mix" - 5:22
9. Evolution "Law Is Q mix" - 7:33
10. Evolution "Original Mix: Instrumental" - 4:41

=== Video single ===
1. "Evolution" PV
2. "TV-CM SPOT"
3. "~Making of - Off shot flash~"

== Live performances ==
- February 2, 2001 - Music Station
- February 3, 2001 - Count Down TV
- February 5, 2001 - Hey! Hey! Hey!
- October 6, 2001 - Pop Jam
- November 17, 2001 - All Japan Request Awards
- December 2, 2001 - Digital Dream Live
- December 23, 2008 - Happy Xmas Show!! (with Days)

== Charts ==
=== Weekly charts ===
Chart (2001)	Peak position
Japan Singles (Oricon)	1
Japan Count Down TV Chart (TBS)	1

Chart (2014)	Peak position
Japan (Adult Contemporary Airplay)	70

=== Monthly charts ===
Chart (2001)	Peak position
Japan Singles (Oricon)	1

=== Year-end charts ===
Chart (2001)	Position
Japan Singles (Oricon)	7
Japan Count Down TV Chart (TBS)	8

=== Decade-end charts ===
Chart (2000–2009)	Position
Japan Singles (Oricon)	31

== Certifications ==
Region	Certification	Certified units/sales
Japan (RIAJ) Physical single	2× Platinum	955,250
Japan (RIAJ) Digital single	Gold	100,000^{*}
^{*} Sales figures based on certification alone.
