= M (Ayumi Hamasaki song) =

2000 single by Ayumi Hamasaki

Single by Ayumi Hamasaki

from the album A Best and I am...
- Released: December 13, 2000
- Recorded: 2000
- Genre: alternative rock; Pop rock
- Length: 4:26
- Label: Avex Trax
- Composer: Crea
- Lyricist: Ayumi Hamasaki
- Producer: Max Matsuura

Ayumi Hamasaki singles chronology
"Audience" (2000)	"M" (2000)	"Evolution" (2001)

Ayumi Hamasaki German singles chronology
"Connected" (2003)	"M" (2003)	"Depend on You" (2004)

Music video
- "M" on YouTube

"M" is the nineteenth single by Japanese recording artist Ayumi Hamasaki. "M" serves as the lead single to her first greatest hits album A Best (2001) and her fourth studio album I Am... (2002). The track marked Hamasaki's increased creative control over her music, as it was the first song she composed, under the pen name "Crea". The lyrics of "M" are about Hamasaki talking to Maria (the Japanese reference to The Virgin Mary), or also possibly to Mary Magdalene, hence the title "M".

"M" received a positive response from music critics, praising the composition and songwriting. The single is to date one of Hamasaki's most commercially successful; it peaked at the top spot on the Oricon Singles Chart, selling over 500,000 units on its first week. Moreover, the single eventually sold over one million copies over its eighteen-week run and became a RIAJ-certified million-seller; "M" also won the Japan Gold Disc Award for "Song of the Year". Since its release, the single is listed as the 113th best-selling single of all time in Japan.

== Background and themes ==
Shortly after the release of her studio album Duty, Hamasaki began writing "M". Before then, Hamasaki's staff had composed the melodies; Hamasaki only wrote the lyrics. However, with "M", Hamasaki felt that none of the melodies composed by her staff fit her vision of the song. Consequently, she decided to compose the melody herself. She began work on an electronic keyboard; however, as she had little proficiency in the instrument, Hamasaki eventually resorted to singing the melody into a voice recorder.

Throughout the song, Hamasaki addresses "Maria". Hamasaki is ambiguous as to the identity of "Maria"; however, she has stated that the song was inspired by a story told to her by a friend about a saint named Mary. The story was pivotal in the shaping of the theme of the song, which, according to Hamasaki, is about a "woman who won't change with time". Finally, like other songs from I am..., Hamasaki explores the topics of couples and love.

== Composition and musical style ==
"M" (2000)
A 25-second sample of "M". At 0:15 of the clip, Hamasaki's voice shifts from C-sharp major to A-sharp minor.

According to Hamasaki, the melodies composed by her staff for "M" did not fit her image for the song because they were too "warm"—she had envisioned a melody with a "cold" feeling. That, according to Hamasaki, meant a melody that was "difficult to grasp" and started in a lower key before progressing to a higher key. The song is written in common time and begins in the key of C major before progressing to the key of C-sharp major. The song uses piano, electric guitar, triangle, and various stringed instruments.

"M", unlike Hamasaki's antecedent songs, does not follow the verse-chorus form; rather, the song opens with an introduction that is followed by a brief instrumental bridge that precedes two verses. The verses are followed by a pre-chorus after which comes an instrumental bridge; that is followed by a repetition of the pre-chorus and the verse. The chorus and a repetition of it follow; the chorus and its repetition are separated by another instrumental bridge. Finally, a second verse is sung before the repetition of the introduction, at which point the song ends.

== Music video ==
A scene from the music video

The music video for "M", directed by Wataru Takeishi, opens with Hamasaki singing the introduction against a stained-glass window. The first instrumental bridge follows, during which is seen the exterior of a cathedral. When the first verse starts, the doors of the cathedral open and glowing particles sweep into the cathedral; at the start of the second instrumental bridge, the particles merge and Hamasaki appears in a wedding gown, at the intersection of the transept and the aisle, also in this scene she is wearing blue contacts. When the chorus starts, Hamasaki is seen outside the cathedral (no longer in a gown) singing with her band; subsequent scenes switch between Hamasaki singing outside the cathedral and standing inside. At the end of the video, the glowing particles sweep out of the cathedral and the gown-clad Hamasaki disappears.

== Critical response ==
"M" was positively reviewed by music critics. Jeff from Random.Access.Reviews stated that "M" was his favorite song on I am.... He commented "It's a very chilled but introspective-sounding song (I can't be certain how introspective it is), a bit folksy at times but nice to listen to, plus it has some wild guitar work later on, reminiscent of Guns 'N Roses of olde." Jeff commented that the globally acclaimed remix by Above & Beyond was great. Neil Z. Yeung called "M" the most moving and emotionally impactful song of the whole record. Michael McCarthy of Lollipop said that Hamasaki's delivery is intense and emotional in "M' and the rest of the record's ballads.

== Chart performance and sales ==
"M" debuted at the number-one position on the weekly Oricon Singles Chart on its first week of release, selling 541,350 copies, beating out "Ren'ai Revolution 21" by Morning Musume. The single remained atop the charts the second week; however, the total sales for that week had dropped to 185,290. The sales rose the third week: the single sold 246,150 copies; however, it was only able to reach the number-two position, as Every Little Thing's single "Fragile/Jirenma" debuted that week with 278,120 copies. By the fourth week, "M" remained at the number-two position with 95,770 copies sold. It remained in the Top 10 the following three weeks, dropping from the number-five position to the number-seven position. It remained in the Top 30 for two more weeks; it reached the twenty-third position before dropping out. By the end of its nine-week run in the Oricon Top 30, "M" sold 1,279,830 copies, making it the best-selling single from I am... and adding to Hamasaki's million-selling singles. "M" reached number-one on the Japanese Count Down TV Chart hosted by Tokyo Broadcasting System (TBS) for two weeks, and remained on the chart for seventeen weeks. The single is also Oricon's last single to win the number-one spot on the monthly singles chart for two consecutive months in the 20th century.

By the end of 2001, "M" was ranked at number two on Oricon's annual singles chart, just behind Hikaru Utada's "Can You Keep a Secret?"; it sold 1,319,070 units by the end of the year. "M" ranked at number 31 on TBS' annual chart for 2000, and ranked at 27th place on the 2001 edition of the chart. In the ranking of copyright royalty distribution amounts (domestic works) by the Japanese Society for Rights of Authors, Composers and Publishers (JASRAC), the song "M" ranked 7th for the year 2001. Since its release, the single is listed as the 113th best-selling single of all time in Japan.

== Promotion ==
The song was aired extensively as a commercial song for TU-KA, in which she appeared, and a "limited edition Ayu model" leopard print cell phone was released in honor of the leopard print she had shown on the jacket of "Surreal" from Duty released three months earlier. The other commercial features the remix and promotes the TU-KA funstyle mobile phone; the "𝓜 "funstyle Mix" used in the commercial for TU-KA's music data distribution service "funstyle" was specially re-edited for the funstyle sound source and later recorded as the "𝓜 "RANK-M Mix". She also appeared on a TV program at the time wearing an image of the Virgin Mary as she did in her music videos and jacket.

== Accolades ==
"M" won the award for "Song of the year" at the 2001 Japan Gold Disc Awards. In early 2014, in honor of Hamasaki's sixteenth-year career milestone, Japanese website Goo.ne.jp hosted a poll for fans to rank their favorite songs by Hamasaki out of thirty positions; the poll was held in only twenty-four hours, and thousands submitted their votes. As a result, "M" was ranked at number two, behind "Seasons", with 93.2 percent of the votes.

Additionally, the Above & Beyond remix is considered a vocal trance classic, ranking at number 653 in Trance Top 1000 in 2011, and number 177 in A State of Trance Top 1000 in 2021.

== Track listings ==
Japanese maxi-CD single

1. "M" (original mix)
2. "M" (Dub's Hard Pop remix)
3. "Seasons" (Yuta's Weather Report mix)
4. "M" (Nicely Nice Winter Parade remix)
5. "Far Away" (Laugh & Peace mix)
6. "M" (Rewired mix)
7. "M" (Smokers mix)
8. "M" (Rank-M mix)
9. "M" (Neurotic Eye's mix)
10. "M" (original mix instrumental)

Japanese 2×12-inch vinyl E.P.

A1. "M" (Above & Beyond Typhoon dub mix)
B1. "Boys & Girls (Push instrumental dub)
B2. "Unite!" (Airwave dub)
C1. "Unite!" (Airwave remix)
C2. "Appears" (Armin van Buuren's Sunset dub)
D1. "Unite!" (Moogwai dub)
D2. "Audience" (Darren Tate instrumental)

German 12-inch vinyl (Part 1)

A. "M" (Above & Beyond Typhoon dub mix)
B. "M" (Above & Beyond vocal mix)

German 12-inch vinyl (Part 2)

A1. "M" (Van Eyden vs. M.O.R.P.H. remix) – 7:31
B1. "M" (Tectonic Shift vs. André Visior remix) – 7:55
B2. "M" (Above & Beyond instrumental mix) – 7:47

German maxi-single

1. "M" (Above & Beyond edit) – 4:20
2. "M" (Van Eyden vs. M.O.R.P.H. remix edit) – 4:19
3. "M" (Tectonic Shift vs. André Visior remix edit) – 3:36
4. "M" (Above & Beyond Vocal dub mix) – 8:11
5. "M" (Above & Beyond Typhoon dub mix) – 8:31
6. "M" (Above & Beyond vocal mix) – 8:01

== Personnel ==
- Melodic Composition: Ayumi Hamasaki (under the pseudonym "Crea")
- Arrangement: HΛL
- Mastering: Shigeo Miyamoto
- Mixing: Koji Morimoto
- Production assisting: Yuka Akiyama
- Production: Max Matsuura
- Sound production: Naoto Suzuki
- Vocals: Ayumi Hamasaki

== Charts ==
=== Weekly charts ===
Chart (2000–2001)	Peak position
UK Club Chart (Music Week)	11
Japan Count Down TV Chart (TBS)	1
Japan Singles (Oricon)	1
UK Pop Club Chart (Music Week)	18

Chart (2020)	Peak position
Japan (Japan Hot 100)	86

=== Monthly charts ===
Chart (2000)	Peak position
Japan Singles (Oricon)	1

=== Year-end charts ===
2000 year-end charts for M
Chart (2000)	Position
Japan Count Down TV Chart (TBS)	31

Chart (2001)	Position
UK Club Chart (Music Week)	99
Japan Singles (Oricon)	2
Japan Count Down TV Chart (TBS)	27

=== Decade-end charts ===
Chart (2000–2009)	Position
Japan Singles (Oricon)	10

=== All-time chart ===
Chart	Position
Japan Singles (Oricon)	113

== Certifications ==
Region	Certification	Certified units/sales
Japan (RIAJ) Physical sales	Million	1,319,070
Japan (RIAJ) Digital downloads	Platinum	250,000^{*}
Streaming
Japan (RIAJ)	Platinum	100,000,000^{†}
^{*} Sales figures based on certification alone.^{†} Streaming-only figures based on certification alone.

== Release history ==
Country	Release date
Japan	December 13, 2000
Europe	October 27, 2003
