= Endless Sorrow =

Single by Ayumi Hamasaki

from the album I am...
- Released: May 16, 2001
- Genre: Pop rock; alternative rock
- Length: 54:45
- Label: Avex Trax
- Songwriters: Ayumi Hamasaki (lyrics); CREA (music)
- Producer: Max Matsuura

Ayumi Hamasaki singles chronology
"Never Ever" (2001)	"Endless Sorrow" (2001)	"Unite!" (2001)

Official Music Video
- "Endless Sorrow" on YouTube

"Endless Sorrow" is a song recorded by Japanese singer Ayumi Hamasaki, released as her 22nd single on May 16, 2001.

== Background ==
This was Hamasaki's fourth single to be composed by herself using the pseudonym Crea. Its original single version, which features strings, piano, and rock leanings, was arranged by CMJK and Junichi Matsuda. For Hamasaki's fourth studio album I am... the song re-arranged by CMJK in a version entitled "Gone With Whe Wind ver.", which has a calmer soft-rock oriented sound. "Endless Sorrow" was used as theme song of TBS's drama Mukashi no Otoko, which aired from April to late June 2001. One of the b-sides of the single, "Vogue (Kirari Natsu Ayu Mix)" was used in TV commercials for Kose Visee mascara, starring Hamasaki herself.

== Music video ==
The music video of "Endless Sorrow" depicts a young boy living in a society in which speaking was prohibited by law. The boy, however, climbs a tower, meeting a man (presumably a priest because of his clothing) and a one-winged angel who looks exactly like the boy. Apart from shots of the cover of the Endless Sorrow single, Hamasaki does not appear in the original version of the PV, but in a later version, Hamasaki appears at the end of the video in a trench coat and fedora, and picks up the feather dropped by the boy.

== Track listing ==
Lyrics: Ayumi Hamasaki - Music: Ayumi Hamasaki

1. "Endless Sorrow"
2. "Vogue" (Kirari Natsu Ayu Mix)
3. "Endless Sorrow" (Natural Green Dub Mix)
4. "Endless Sorrow" (Nicely Nice Skyblue remix)
5. "Never Ever" (Dub's Uncategorized Mix 001)
6. "Endless Sorrow" (Ram's Advance Mix)
7. "Endless Sorrow" (Brent Mini's gothic mix)
8. "Endless Sorrow" (Liquid Heart Mix)
9. "Endless Sorrow" (Juicy Ariyama Mix)
10. "Endless Sorrow" (Instrumental)

== Live performances ==
- July 1, 2001 - CountDown TV - Endless sorrow and Unite!
- December 2, 2001 - Digital Dream Live - Endless sorrow and Evolution

== Charts ==
Oricon Sales Chart (Japan)

Release	Chart	Peak position	First week sales	Sales total
16 May 2001	Oricon Daily Singles Chart	1		
16 May 2001	Oricon Weekly Singles Chart	1	430,220	768,510
16 May 2001	Oricon Yearly Singles Chart	14		

- RIAJ certification: 3× Platinum
