= Ayumi Hamasaki Countdown Live 2014–2015 A: Cirque de Minuit =

Video by Ayumi Hamasaki
- Released: April 8, 2015
- Recorded: December 31, 2014
- Venue: Yoyogi National Gymnasium
- Genre: J-pop
- Label: Avex

Ayumi Hamasaki chronology
Ayumi Hamasaki Premium Showcase: Feel the Love (2014)	Ayumi Hamasaki Countdown Live 2014–2015 A: Cirque de Minuit (2015)	Ayumi Hamasaki Arena Tour 2015 A: Cirque de Minuit – The Final (2015)

Ayumi Hamasaki Countdown Live 2014–2015 A: Cirque de Minuit is Japanese pop singer Ayumi Hamasaki's 14th Countdown concert DVD. It was released on April 8, 2015. The concert was held at the Yoyogi National Gymnasium on December 29, 30 and 31, 2014.

The release reached No. 1 on the Oricon DVD Chart, becoming her first DVD to do so since Ayumi Hamasaki Countdown Live 2010–2011 A: Do It Again. The Blu-ray version charted at No. 8.

Additionally, the DVD includes first-time performances of all of her songs from the single "Zutto.../Last Minute/Walk", which she promoted during the show.

== Release ==
It was released in four formats, with the first two being a standard DVD version and a Blu-ray version. The concert was also available in form of a TeamAyu-exclusive bundle with Hamasaki's 16th studio album A One (2015). The bundles were as the following: Album + DVD + Live DVD + Goods and Album + Blu-ray + Live Blu-ray + Goods. Both TeamAyu bundles came with a set of a photo cards and a picture frame.

== Track list ==
Track list taken from Avex.

1. "Duty"
2. "Microphone"
3. "Energy Blasts"
4. "Game"
5. "My Name's Women"
6. "1 Love"
7. "End Roll"
8. "Zutto..."
9. "Last Minute"
10. "Tears"
11. "Walk"
12. "Forgiveness"
13. "Progress"
14. "Surreal" ~ "Evolution" ~ "Surreal"
15. "Now & 4Eva"
  Encore
16. "Movin' On Without You"
17. "Xoxo"
18. "Lelio"
19. "Boys & Girls"
20. "How Beautiful You Are"
  Double Encore
21. "Born to Be..."

== Charts ==
Release	Chart	Peak position
April 8, 2015	Oricon DVD Chart (General)	1
April 8, 2015	Oricon Blu-ray Chart (General)	8
