= Made in Japan (Ayumi Hamasaki album) =

- The CD and DVD, and digital artwork

Studio album by Ayumi Hamasaki
- Released: May 11, 2016
- Recorded: 2015–2016
- Genres: J-pop, rock
- Length: 43:47
- Label: Avex Music Creative
- Producer: Max Matsuura

Ayumi Hamasaki chronology
A One (2015)	Made in Japan (2016)	Trouble (2018)

Made in Japan (stylized as MDE IN JAPAN) is the seventeenth studio album by Japanese recording artist Ayumi Hamasaki. It initially debuted on the streaming service AWA Japan on May 11, 2016, before receiving a physical and digital release on June 29, 2016. It is Hamasaki's seventeenth consecutive studio album, since her debut album A Song for ×× (1999), to be fully written by her and produced by Japanese musician Max Matsuura. Musically, the album encompasses a variety of genres including hard rock, ballad, and electronic dance music.

Upon its release, Made in Japan received a positive review by Patrick St. Michel at The Japan Times, who reviewed the album based on its streaming release. Commercially, the album's first week sales underperformed in comparison to Hamasaki's previous albums, but reached number two on the Oricon Albums Chart, making it her highest entry since Love Again in 2013.

To promote the release, she embarked on an extension of her 2015–2016 countdown concert tour Made in Tokyo, under the same name as the album. Although no singles were released from the album, the tracks "Flower" and "Mad World" received music videos with the former being performed on Music Station. The album also includes a cover of "Many Classic Moments" by Japanese band Globe, which was released promotionally through the tribute album #Globe20th.

== Background and composition ==
In April 2015, Hamasaki released her sixteenth studio album named A One. To promote the album, she commenced two concert tours throughout 2015 in Japan; the Final Cirque de Minuit Arena Tour, and an annual live New Years countdown show name Made in Tokyo. During both concert tours, Hamasaki begun writing material for her seventeenth studio album; an announcement about the album was then publicly made in January 2016 via Instagram. Through early to mid May 2016, Hamasaki used social media services, such as Facebook and Instagram, to show lyrical teasers of songs for her seventeenth studio album; these songs were "Mad World", "Survivor", "You Are the Only One", "Today", and "Flower". Then on May 11, 2016, Hamasaki released the album via streaming service AWA Japan.

Made in Japan is Hamasaki's seventeenth consecutive studio album, since her debut album A Song for ×× (1999) to be fully written by her. It is also the seventeenth studio effort that was produced by Japanese musician Max Matsuura since her debut. Musically, the album contains a variety of genres including hard rock, ballad, and electronic dance music, as described by Patrick St. Michel at The Japan Times and Hamasaki. The album consists of nine original new tracks, with one of them being an opening instrumental track, and one cover; the cover is "Many Classic Moments", which was originally recorded by Japanese group Globe and appeared on their tribute album, #Globe20th in 2015. St. Michel stated that "Made in Japan" "finds Hamasaki jumping between sounds, hop-scotching from driving rock numbers featuring arena-ready guitar solos to surging ballads... all familiar ground to her."

== Release ==
Made in Japan was released through the streaming service AWA Japan on May 11, 2016, and was eventually released physically and digitally on June 29 in six different formats. The first release is the CD format, which included the ten tracks. The next formats are the DVD and Blu-ray bundles; this included the ten tracks on one CD, and the music videos to the songs "Flower", "Mad World", and "Winter Diary" on a second disc, where the latter track was recorded and promoted with her remix album Winter Diary: A7 Classical (2015). Both formats including the "behind the scenes" of all three videos. The next two formats are double DVD and a second Blu-ray, that were released exclusively through Hamasaki's TeamAyu membership website; both formats include the ten tracks on one disc, 15 live videos from her Limited TA Live concert in Zepp, Tokyo, and the three music videos and three "behind the scenes" videos. The sixth and final format is the digital download, which includes the ten tracks. The artwork for the first four all formats, including the digital release, has Hamasaki holding rope, while the TeamAyu editions are close-ups of her face.

== Critical reception ==
Professional ratings
Review scores
Source	Rating
AllMusic	3.5/5 stars

Upon its release, M(a)de in Japan has received positive reviews from music critics. Patrick St. Michel, writing for The Japan Times, gave the release a positive review. He stated, "For Hamasaki, though, this is her best work in years, thanks primarily to a play-time clocking in at under 40 minutes." He commended the tracks "Tasky" and "Flower" for emphasising traditional Japanese music, and highlighted "Summer Love" as a stand out. However, he did select the "cheesy" cover of "Many Classic Moments" as the album's worst track.

== Commercial performance ==
Five days after the album's release on AWA services, it accumulated over one million streams in Japan. Made in Japan debuted at number two on the Daily Oricon Albums Chart, just behind the compilation album Cinderella Master Cool Jewelries! 003 by The Idolmaster. Hamasaki's album sold 19,898 units on June 29, her second lowest daily count behind Sixxxxxx than her previous studio album A One with 20,025 sold units. It fell to number four the following day, selling under 4,500 units. On its third day it claimed up to number three, selling 2,032 units. The album then debuted at number two on the Weekly Oricon Albums Chart, selling 30,269 units.

== Promotion ==
To promote the album, Hamasaki started her 2016 Arena tour that shares the same name as the album. The tour opened at NGK Insulators Hall, Nagoya on May 17, 2016, and finished on July 17 at the Osaka-jō Hall in Osaka. She also performed the song "FLOWER" on July 29, 2016, on the Japanese TV show Music Station.

== Track listing ==
All lyrics are written by Ayumi Hamasaki, except for track 10 written by Tetsuya Komuro.

CD
No.	Title	Music	Arranger	Length
1.	"Tasky"	Tasuku	Tasuku	1:58
2.	"Flower"	Tetsuya Yukumi	Tasuku	3:39
3.	"Mad World"	Tasuku	Tasuku	4:18
4.	"Breakdown"	Yukumi	Yuta Nakano	4:33
5.	"Survivor"	Timothy Wellard	Nakano	4:13
6.	"You Are the Only One"	Wellard	Nakano	5:00
7.	"Today"	Shun Ueno	Atsushi Sato; Takehito Shimizu	5:13
8.	"Mr. Darling"	Yukumi	Tasuku	3:58
9.	"Summer Love"	Mayuko Maruyama	Tasuku	4:48
10.	"Many Classic Moments" (Globe cover)	Tetsuya Komuro	Yohanne Simon (RedOne Productions)	6:07

Regular Blu-ray / Regular DVD / TeamAyu DVD 2
No.	Title	Director(s)	Length
1.	"Flower" (Video Clip)	Masashi Muto
2.	"Mad World" (Video Clip)	Muto
3.	"Winter Diary" (Video Clip)
4.	"Flower" (Making of)
5.	"Mad World" (Making of)
6.	"Winter Diary" (Making of)

TeamAyu Blu-ray / DVD 1: Limited TA Live Tour at Zepp Tokyo
No.	Title	Length
1.	"Sorrows"
2.	"Startin'"
3.	"Unite!"
4.	"Last Minute"
5.	"Heartplace"
6.	"Days"
7.	"Beloved"
8.	"Summer Diary"
9.	"Heaven"
10.	"XOXO" / "Lelio" / "Sparkle" / "Feel the love" / "You & Me"
11.	"Love Song"
12.	"Boys & Girls"
13.	"The Show Must Go On"
14.	"Replace"
15.	"My All"
16.	"FLOWER" (video clip [Blu-ray only])
17.	"Mad World" (video clip [Blu-ray only])
18.	"Winter diary" (video clip [Blu-ray only])
19.	"FLOWER" (making of [Blu-ray only])
20.	"Mad World" (making of [Blu-ray only])
21.	"Winter diary" (making of [Blu-ray only])

== Charts ==
=== Weekly charts === : Chart (2016) / Peak position; Japanese Albums (Oricon) / 2; === Monthly charts === : Chart (2016) / Peak position; Japanese Albums (Oricon) / 14	=== Year-end charts === : Chart (2016) / Position; Japanese Albums (Oricon) / 109

== Sales ==
Region	Certification	Certified units/sales
Japan	—	55,000

== Release history ==
Region	Date	Format	Label
Japan	May 11, 2016	Online streaming	Avex Trax; CyberAgent Inc.
Japan	June 29, 2016	CD	Avex Trax
Japan	June 29, 2016	CD and DVD	Avex Trax
Japan	June 29, 2016	CD and Blu-Ray	Avex Trax
Japan	June 29, 2016	TeamAyu CD and double DVD	Avex Trax
Japan	June 29, 2016	TeamAyu CD and Blu-Ray	Avex Trax
Japan	June 29, 2016	Digital download	Avex Music Creative Inc.
Australia	June 29, 2016	Digital download	Avex Music Creative Inc.
New Zealand	June 29, 2016	Digital download	Avex Music Creative Inc.
United Kingdom	June 29, 2016	Digital download	Avex Music Creative Inc.
Ireland	June 29, 2016	Digital download	Avex Music Creative Inc.
Germany	June 29, 2016	Digital download	Avex Music Creative Inc.
Spain	June 29, 2016	Digital download	Avex Music Creative Inc.
France	June 29, 2016	Digital download	Avex Music Creative Inc.
Italy	June 29, 2016	Digital download	Avex Music Creative Inc.
Taiwan	June 29, 2016	Digital download	Avex Music Creative Inc.
