= Love Classics (album) =

Compilation album by Ayumi Hamasaki
- Released: January 28, 2015
- Genres: J-pop, pop-classical crossover
- Length: 51:26
- Label: Avex Trax
- Producer: Max Matsuura

Ayumi Hamasaki chronology
Colours (2014)	Love Classics (2015)	A One (2015)

Love Classics is a compilation album by Japanese entertainer Ayumi Hamasaki. It was released on January 28, 2015, by Avex Trax.

== Background ==
This was Hamasaki's first for 2015, and dubbed as a "mash-up album" between Hamasaki's love songs and classical music, it was composed of previously released ballad love songs, which were rearranged using classical pieces from renowned European compositors, such as Antonio Vivaldi, Johann Sebastian Bach, Frédéric Chopin, and Claude Debussy, among others. The album was commercially prepared to be a Valentine's Day present. The album cover, created by visual artist Aki Miyajima, is based on one of the covers of Hamasaki's single "Zutto.../Last Minute/Walk" released in December 2014.

== Track listing ==
All lyrics are written by Ayumi Hamasaki.

CD
No.	Title	music	Length
1.	"Voyage" (Johann Pachelbel's Pachelbel's Canon)	Ayumi Hamasaki + D.A.I.	4:50
2.	"Seasons" (Antonín Dvořák's Going Home, from Symphony No. 9 From the New World, 2nd Movement)	D.A.I.	4:21
3.	"Days" (Antonio Vivaldi's The Four Seasons, Winter, 2nd Movement)	Kunio Tago	5:59
4.	"To Be" (Johann Sebastian Bach's The Well-Tempered Clavier, Book 1, Prelude)	D.A.I.	5:11
5.	"You" (Christian Petzold's Minuet)	Yasuhiko Hoshino	5:44
6.	"Virgin Road" (Frédéric Chopin's Raindrop Prelude)	Tetsuya Komuro	6:03
7.	"Dearest" (Antonín Dvořák's Humoresque No. 7)	Naoto Suzuki	5:04
8.	"Honey" (George Frideric Handel's Messiah Oratorio - "Hallelujah" chorus)	Tetsuya Yukumi	4:43
9.	"Winding Road" (Claude Debussy's Préludes Book 1, La Fille aux Cheveux de Lin)	Ayumi Hamasaki	4:35
10.	"Who..." (Edward Elgar's Salut d'Amour)	Kazuhito Kikuchi	4:52
Total length:			51:26

== Chart performance ==
The album debuted at number 16 on the Oricon charts, with 6,192 copies sold. Love Classics charted for 4 weeks, selling 8,272 copies in total.
