= Ayumi Hamasaki Arena Tour 2015 A: Cirque de Minuit – The Final =

Video by Ayumi Hamasaki
- Released: October 28, 2015
- Recorded: July 5, 2015
- Venue: Yokohama Arena
- Genre: J-pop
- Label: Avex

Ayumi Hamasaki chronology
Ayumi Hamasaki Countdown Live 2014–2015 A: Cirque de Minuit (2015)	Ayumi Hamasaki Arena Tour 2015 A: Cirque de Minuit – The Final (2015)	Team Ayu Limited Live Tour 2015 (2016)

Ayumi Hamasaki Arena Tour 2015 A: Cirque de Minuit – The Final is Japanese pop singer Ayumi Hamasaki's 40th DVD/Blu-ray release. It was released on October 28, 2015. The tour started on April 11, 2015, at Saitama Super Arena and initially ended on June 7, 2015, at Yoyogi National Gymnasium. However, four additional dates - promoted as "The Final" - were added and the tour finished on July 5, 2015, at Yokohama Arena.

The DVD peaked at No. 1 on the weekly Oricon DVD Chart, while the Blu-ray reached No. 11.

== Release ==
The DVD/Blu-ray was released in four formats: a standard 2DVD version, a Blu-ray version, a 2DVD TeamAyu version and a Blu-ray TeamAyu version. The TeamAyu edition includes a T-shirt and the MC collection.

== Track list ==
Track list taken from Avex.^{[A]}

1. "Duty"
2. "Pride"
3. "Microphone"
4. "Lost in Trance"
5. "Game"
6. "My Name's Women"
7. "Until that Day..."
8. "1 Love"
9. "Warning"
10. "Diary"
11. "Happy Ending"
12. "Secret"
13. "Last Minute"
14. "Tears"
15. "A Song For ××"
16. "Out of Control"
17. "Waltz"
18. "Anything For You"
19. "Forgiveness"
20. "Progress"
21. "A Bell"
22. "Rule"
23. "Lady Dynamite"
24. "Immature"
25. "Evolution"
26. "Mirrorcle World"
27. "Teddy Bear"
  Encore
28. "Step by Step"
29. "Movin' On Without You"
30. "Sunrise (Love Is All)" ~ "Blue Bird" ~ "Independent" ~ "You & Me" ~ "Greatful Days" ~ "Blossom" ~ "July 1st"
31. "Boys & Girls"
32. "The Show Must Go On"
33. "Who..."
  Double Encore
34. "My All"

Bonus contents

- Tour Documentary
- MC Collection (Limited TeamAyu Edition only)

^{[A]} For the 2DVD version, the track list is spread over two discs. Disc 2 includes all songs from the encore, starting with Step by Step.

== Charts ==
Release	Chart	Peak position
October 28, 2015	Oricon DVD Chart (General)	1
October 28, 2015	Oricon Blu-ray Chart (General)	11
