= Ayuready? =

- Genre: Talk show
- Created by: Ayumi Hamasaki
- Starring: Ayumi Hamasaki
- Ending theme: "+" by Ayumi Hamasaki
- Country of origin: Japan
- Original language: Japanese
- No. of episodes: 74

Production
- Running time: 25 minutes
- Production companies: East Entertainment; Fuji Television

Original release
- Network: Fuji Television
- Release: October 12, 2002 – March 20, 2004

Ayuready? was a late night Japanese talk show that ran from 2002 to 2004. The show's format consisted of the host, singer-songwriter Ayumi Hamasaki, interviewing and performing with musicians and other celebrities. The show also featured regular guest hosts Hokuyo (北陽), a comedy duo consisting of Abukawa Mihoko and Saori Ito.

The show was broadcast on TV Oita every Saturday, and TV Miyazaki every Sunday. Its last episode aired on March 20, 2004.

== Show details ==
Ayuready? had a total of seventy-four episodes, the majority of which featured celebrity guests who took part in various activities.

The first regular activity, Ayu no Omotenashi (Ayu's Hospitality; あゆのおもてなし) featured Hamasaki preparing and eating requested food with the episode's guests. Ayu Kukkītaimu (Ayu Cookie Time; あゆクッキータイム) was introduced from episode eight, and had guests answer questions from opened fortune cookies. Some episodes also featured the segments Hokuyō Taimu (Hokuyo Time; 北陽タイム) and Live Corner (ライブコーナー).

=== Episode list ===
- 01: Guests: Tsunku, Makoto, Takeshi Kitano; Song performed: "LOVE (since 1999)" [with Tsunku]
- 02: Guests: DA PUMP; Song performed: "'If..." [with DA PUMP]
- 03: Guests: Kuzu; Song performed: "生きてることってすばらしい" (It's Wonderful to be Alive) [with Kuzu]
- 04: Guests: TRF; Songs performed: "寒い夜だから..." (It's Cold Out, So...) and "Crazy Gonna Crazy" [with TRF]
- 05: Guests: EXILE, Papaya Suzuki, Oyaji Dancers; Song performed: "Your Eyes Only" [with EXILE]
- 06: Guests: Fumiya Fujii, Wada Akiko; Song performed: "古い日記" (Old Diary) [with Wada Akiko]
- 07: Guests: Porno Graffitti; Songs performed: "サウダージ" (Saudade; Nostalgia) and '"アゲハ蝶" (Swallowtail Butterfly) [with Porno Graffitti]
- 08: Guests: Fumiya Fujii, Akiko Wada; Song performed: "True Love" [with Fumiya Fujii]
- 09: Guests: Akina Nakamori; Songs performed: "Desire-情熱" (Desire-Passion)and "Shōjo A" [with Akina Nakamori]
- 10: Guests: Every Little Thing; Songs performed: "Dear My Friend" & "You" [with Every Little Thing]
- 11: Guests: Kyoko Fukada; Songs performed: 'White Christmas" & "Dearest" [with Kyoko Fukada]
- 12: Best-of AyuReady? Compilation #1 (Part 1)
- 13: Best-of AyuReady? Compilation #1 (Part 2)
- 14: Guests: Kiroro; Song performed: "長い間" (A Long Interval) [with Kiroro]
- 15: Guests: Tatsuya Ishii; Songs performed: "君がいるだけで" (Just Because You're Here) and "浪漫飛行" (Romantic Flight) [with Tatsuya Ishii]
- 16: Guests: Hitomi Shimatani, Cocorico; Songs performed: "亜麻色 の 髪 の 乙女" (The Maiden with the Flaxen Hair) & "Papillon" [with Hitomi Shimatani]
- 17: Guests: Mach25, Tetsu and Tomo; Songs performed: "Sons of the Sun" and "A Happy Day" [with Mach25]
- 18: Guests: Hideaki Tokunaga, Gokuraku Tombo; Song performed: "輝きながら…" (Shining While...) [with Hideaki Tokunaga]
- 19: Guests: Hideaki Tokunaga, Gokuraku Tombo; Song performed: "壊れかけのRadio" (Broken Radio) [with Hideaki Tokunaga]
- 20: Guests: Matsu Takako, Michiko Shimizu; Songs performed: "Ashita, Haru ga Kitara" & "明日にくちづけを" (Kiss Me Tomorrow) [with Matsu Takako]
- 21: Guests: Kenichi Mikawa, Kiyoshi Hikawa; Songs performed: "さそり座の女" (Scorpio Woman) [with Kenichi Mikawa] & "きよし の ズンドコ節" (Kiyoshi's Zundoko Bushi) [with Kiyoshi Hikawa]
- 22: Guests: Mitsuhiro Oikawa, Hokuyou; Song performed: "Intense Romance" [with Mitsuhiro Oikawa]
- 23: Guests: Maki Goto, Imada Koji; Songs performed: "うわさのSexy Guy" (Rumored Sexy Guy) & "Who..." [with Maki Goto]
- 24: Guests: Masami Hisamoto, Wada Akiko; Songs performed: "M" [with Masami Hisamoto] and "Rainbow"
- 25: Best-of AyuReady? Compilation #2
- 26: Guests: Koichi Iwaki; Song performed: 'Change the World' [with Koichi Iwaki]
- 27: Guests: Mini-Moni; Song performed: "ロックンロール県庁所在地" (Rock n' Roll Prefectural Capitals) [with Mini-Moni]
- 28: Guests: Kiyoharu; Song performed: "Masquerade" [with Kiyoharu]
- 29: AyuReady? Compilation: Best 10 Songs
- 30: Guests: Sonim; Song performed: "カレーライスの女" (The Woman Who Makes Curry and Rice) [with Sonim]
- 31: Coverage of the Rainbow House cafe construction
- 32: Guests: Tamao Nakamura, Sekine Tsutomu; Song performed: 'To Be'
- 33: Guests: Tetsuya Takeda; Song performed: "贈る言葉" (Words of Endearment) [with Tetsuya Takeda]
- 34: Guests: Mika Kano, Kyoko Kano; Song performed: "Can't Take My Eyes Off You" [with Mika Kano]
- 35: Guests: Mika Kano, Kyoko Kano; No song performed
- 36: Guests: Hanerutobira; No song performed
- 37: Best-of AyuReady? Compilation #3
- 38: Guests: Anna Umemiya, Jun Nagura; Song performed: "Ourselves"; Rainbow House cafe opening
- 39: Guests: Toshirou Yanagiba, Kunikazu Katsumata; Song performed: "Greatful Days"
- 40: Guests: Ken Kaneko, Ken Nakagawa; Song performed: "Ourselves"
- 41: Guests: Takashi Fujii, Kosugi Kane; Song performed: 'Greatful Days"
- 42: Guests: Maki Ohguro; Song performed: "La La La" [with Maki Ohguro]
- 43: Guests: Junichi Ishida, Shoko Aida; Song performed: "Greatful Days"
- 44: Guests: Yuki (TRF), / Kaori Mochida (Every Little Thing), BoA, Tomiko Van (Do As Infinity) - Behind the scenes clips of A-Nation 2003; No song performed
- 45: Guests: Maki Kuroudo, Zebra; Song performed: "Hanabi (Episode II)"
- 46: Best-of AyuReady? Compilation #4; Song performed: "Hanabi (Episode II)"
- 47: Guests: Hideyuki Nakayama, You; Song performed: "Forgiveness"
- 48: Guests: Takanori Jinnai; Song performed: "Forgiveness"
- 49: Guests: Dream; Song performed: "I Love World" [with Dream]
- 50: Guests: Toshisuke Nakamura, Yoshinori Okada, Takashi Tsukamoto; Song performed: "かわいいあの娘" (That Cute Girl) [with Toshisuke Nakamura]
- 51: Guests: Tetsuja Tamayama; No song performed
- 52: Guests: Anri; Song performed: "オリビアを聴きながら" (Listening to Olivia) [with Anri]
- 53: Guests: Hanawa; No song performed
- 54: Guests: Yoshihiro Kai; Song performed: "Anna" [with Yoshihiro Kai]
- 55: Guests: Fujiki Naoto; Song performed: "No Way to Say"
- 56: Guests: Shizuka Kudo; No song performed
- 57: Guests: Shizuka Kudo; Songs performed: "恋一夜" (One Night in Love) & "嵐の素顔" (True Face of the Storm) [with Shizuka Kudo]
- 58: Guests: W-inds; Song performed: "Super Lover (I Need You Tonight)" [with W-inds]
- 59: Guests: Princess Tenko; Song performed: "No Way to Say"
- 60: Guests: Kouji Kikawa; Song performed: "Kissに撃たれて眠りたい" (Send Me to Sleep With a Kiss) [with Kouji Kikawa]
- 61: Guests: Kick Tha Can Crew; No song performed
- 62: Guests: Kyoko Fukada; Song performed: "No Way to Say"
- 63: Best-of AyuReady? Compilation #4
- 64: Guests: Hiroshi Tamaki; Song performed: "Because of You"
- 65: Guests: Show Aikawa; Song performed: "Angel's Song"
- 66: Guests: Shingo Yanagisawa; Song performed: "Because of You"
- 67: Guests: Haruhiko Katou; No song performed
- 68: Guests: Masayuki Suzuki; Song performed: "Lonely Chaplin" [with Masayuki Suzuki]
- 69: Guests: Toshio Kakei; Song performed: "Memorial Address"
- 70: Guests: Puffy; Song performed: "これが私の生きる道" (This is my Way of Life) [with Puffy]
- 71: Guests: Hitomi Kuroki; No song performed
- 72: Guests: Cream Stew; Song performed: "Moments"
- 73: Best-of AyuReady? Compilation #5
- 74: Best-of AyuReady? Compilation #6
