= & (Ayumi Hamasaki EP) =

Single by Ayumi Hamasaki

from the album Memorial Address
- Released: July 9, 2003
- Genre: J-pop; soft rock
- Length: 34:00
- Label: Avex Trax
- Songwriter: Ayumi Hamasaki
- Producer: Max Matsuura

Ayumi Hamasaki singles chronology
"Voyage" (2002)	"&" (2003)	"Forgiveness" (2003)

Official Music Video
- "Ourselves" on YouTube

Official Music Video
- "Greatful Days" on YouTube

Official Music Video
- "Hanabi: Episode II" on YouTube

& is an extended play by Japanese recording artist and songwriter Ayumi Hamasaki. It was released on July 9, 2003, by record label Avex Trax. Hamasaki's fourth extended play, & consists of four recordings; "Ourselves", "Greatful Days", "Hanabi: Episode II", and "Theme of A-Nation 03", with three additional instrumentals of the first three tracks. It was released in two different formats; a stand-alone CD, and a digital EP. The artwork for the EP depicts Hamasaki posing in front of a cloudy backdrop, with the title of the work superimposed over her hair. & contains predominantly J-pop and dance music.

Hamasaki contributed by writing the lyrics to all the tracks, while Japanese production and manager Max Matsuura served as the EP's main producer. & received favourable reviews from music critics who commended the EP's production and commercial appeal. & reached number one on the Oricon Singles Chart, and was certified double platinum by the Recording Industry Association of Japan (RIAJ) for shipments of 500,000 units. "Ourselves", "Greatful Days", "Hanabi: Episode II", and "Theme of A-Nation 03" served as promotional singles, while all but the latter track receiving music videos respectively. & was awarded the Japan Record Award at the 46th Japan Record Awards for Best Pop/Rock Album.

== Background and release ==
Ayumi Hamasaki announced that she would release a new extended play, marketed as a single, entitled &. It consists of four recordings – "Ourselves", "Greatful Days", "Hanabi: Episode II", and "Theme of A-Nation 03" – with additional instrumental versions of the first three tracks. & was released on July 9, 2003, as the first single from Hamasaki's 2003 extended play, Memorial Address. ("Ourselves", "Greatful Days", and "Hanabi: Episode II" were included in Memorial Address.) & follows the releases of Hamasaki's previous extended plays; Nothing from Nothing (1995), A (1999), and H (2002). Hamasaki did not release another extended-play single until Five in 2011. & was released in two formats: a stand-alone CD and a digital EP. The artwork for the EP depicts Hamasaki posing in front of a cloudy backdrop, with the title of the work superimposed over her hair.

== Composition ==
& opens with "Ourselves", which is an R&B tune with influences of "exoticism pop". The lyrics describe Hamasaki's "painful" sense of sorrow and love. "Greatful Days" is a "refreshing" pop song that showcases Hamasaki's "festive" nature, her "pastel" vocals, and a "relaxing" positive message of happiness. "Hanabi: Episode II" is an answer song to Hamasaki's 2002 song, "Hanabi". It describes Hamasaki's "miserable" state and "struggle[s]" that is transformed into strength. "Theme of A-Nation 03" was used for the Avex A-Nation concert tour in 2003, and emphasizes traditional Japanese instrumentals, progressing more oriental J-pop sounds. The next three tracks are instrumental versions of "Ourselves", "Greatful Days", and "Hanabi: Episode II".

== Promotion ==
"Ourselves", "Greatful Days", and "Hanabi: Episode II" all served as the EP's promotional singles, released on July 9, 2003; the singles did not chart in any Japanese music charts. The singles were promoted through different endorsements deals in Japan; "Ourselves" was used as the televised theme song for Japanese cosmetics brand, Visee, and "Greatful Days" was used as the theme song for Hamasaki's 2004 TV series, Ayuready?. However, by the time the promotion of &, Memorial Address, and her 2003–2004 arena tour was complete, Hamasaki had grown dissatisfied with her position in Avex; she felt that the company was treating her as a product instead of a person. Although Hamasaki initially supported the exploitation of her popularity for commercial purposes, saying that it was "necessary that [she is] viewed as a product", she eventually opposed Avex's decision to market her as a "product rather than a person". All three songs featured an accompanying music video, which were included on several DVD compilations by Hamasaki.

The music video for "Ourselves" begins with Hamasaki leaving her friends and going into her car. When she is in the car she sees a red colored photo of herself (what is revealed to be the album cover of A Best), then she looks shocked and tries to open the door but it's locked. Then the song begins and she finds herself in a room and masked people come to the car and break it with weapons. After, Hamasaki is seen chained to the wall with scientists laughing and testing her. Throughout the video, the masked people wreck Hamasaki's life and rebirth. In the end of the video, Hamasaki is back in the place where she was from before and looks back and sees 2 masked people. There were also inter cut scenes of Hamasaki in a dark gothic witchy persona looking at the camera and moving around.

The music video for "Greatful Days" features Hamasaki sitting on a sofa reading a magazine. When she is reading, a crocodile is seen coming but it disappears and a man on a motorbike comes crashing through the wall. There were also other scenes of Hamasaki at a party.

The music video for "Hanabi Episode II" depicts Hamasaki on a grey beach set and in the end sparks start falling behind her.

== Reception ==
Professional ratings
Review scores
Source	Rating
CD Journal	(positive)
Hot Express	(positive)
Listen Japan	(positive)

& received favourable reviews from music critics. A reviewer from CD Journal commended the EP's production, and highlighted all the singles as stand out tracks; the reviewer highlighted its "music quality" as a positive note. Kondo Yang from Listen Japan was positive in his review, stating that & was a sign of growing "maturity" in Hamasaki's music. He also felt that her "charisma" and "personality" was a reason why & became successful. Eri Kato from Hot Express was positive in her review, commending Hamasaki's songwriting and composing skills, particularly with "Hanabi: Episode II", and the music arrangements. She later praised them as "unique masterpieces" and Alexey Eremenko, who wrote the biography for Hamasaki on AllMusic, highlighted "Ourselves" and "Greatful Days" as one of the stand-out tracks of the extended play and Hamasaki's long career.

On the Japanese Oricon Singles Chart, & reached number one on its debut week, her third consecutive EP to have reached number one, and her sixteenth number one single overall. The EP lasted sixteen weeks in the top 100, selling 680,000 units, (Note: Sales provided by Oricon database and are rounded to the nearest thousand copies.) and was certified double platinum by the Recording Industry Association of Japan (RIAJ) for shipments of 600,000 units. & is Hamasaki's final single to sell over 600,000 units, and her only post-single to achieve a close achievement of the limit is "No Way to Say" with 400,000 physical and digital sales.

== Track listing ==
CD content
No.	Title	Writer(s)	Producer(s)	Length
1.	"Ourselves"	Ayumi Hamasaki	Max Matsuura	4:34
2.	"Greatful Days"	Ayumi Hamasaki	Max Matsuura	4:39
3.	"Hanabi: Episode II"	Ayumi Hamasaki	Max Matsuura	4:56
4.	"Theme of A-Nation '03"	Ayumi Hamasaki	Max Matsuura	6:16
5.	"Ourselves" (Instrumental)	Ayumi Hamasaki	Max Matsuura	4:34
6.	"Greatful Days" (Instrumental)	Ayumi Hamasaki	Max Matsuura	4:39
7.	"Hanabi: Episode II" (Instrumental)	Ayumi Hamasaki	Max Matsuura	4:56
Total length:				34:34

== Charts ==
=== Weekly charts ===
Chart (2003)	Peak position
Japan Singles (Oricon)	1

=== Year-end charts ===
Chart (2003)	Position
Japan Singles (Oricon)	8

== Certifications ==
Region	Certification	Certified units/sales
Japan (RIAJ)	2× Platinum	680,000
