= Step by Step (Ayumi Hamasaki song) =

2015 single by Ayumi Hamasaki

Single by Ayumi Hamasaki

from the EP Sixxxxxx
- B-side: "July 1st"
- Released: July 1, 2015
- Recorded: 2015
- Genre: J-pop
- Length: 4:37
- Label: Avex Trax
- Songwriters: Ayumi Hamasaki (lyrics); Tetsuya Yukumi (music)
- Producer: Max Matsuura

Ayumi Hamasaki singles chronology
"Zutto.../Last Minute/Walk" (2014)	"Step by Step" (2015)	"We Are the Queens" (2016)

Music video
- "Step by Step" on YouTube

"Step by Step" (stylized as "Step by step") is a song by Japanese singer-songwriter Ayumi Hamasaki. It was released on July 1, 2015, as the digital lead single from her EP Sixxxxxx. The song was used as the theme song for the Yukie Nakama-starring NHK TV drama Bijo to Danshi.

Although the song did not enter the Oricon Singles Chart, it did peak at number 21 on the Billboard Japan Hot 100 Chart.

== Background ==
"Step by step" was first mentioned in April 2015. Eventually, it was announced that the song would be used as the theme song for the NHK drama Bijo to Danshi, starring Yukie Nakama. The song was then released as a digital single on July 1, 2015.

== Writing and production ==
The song's lyrics were written by Hamasaki herself, with music by Tetsuya Yukumi. Long-time collaborator Yuta Nakano served as the song's arranger.

== Release ==
The song was released as an exclusively digital single on July 1, 2015, with "July 1st" serving as a digital B-side.

== Promotion ==
On July 1, 2015 - the day of the single's release - a short version of the song's music video was uploaded to YouTube. "Step by Step" was also performed during Hamasaki's Arena Tour 2015 and her appearance on the music program NHK Songs.

== Music video ==
A music video for the song was included on Sixxxxxx. It depicts Hamasaki alongside other women, who are trying to free themselves from their struggles.

== Track listing ==
=== Digital download ===
No.	Title	Length
1.	"Step by Step"	4:37
2.	"July 1st"	4:22
Total length:		8:59

=== Streaming ===
No.	Title	Length
1.	"Step by Step"	4:37

== Charts ==
Chart (2015)	Peak position
Billboard Japan Hot 100	21

== Personnel ==
Credits adapted from Discogs.

- Arrangement, Programming – Yuta Nakano
- Guitar – Ryota Akizuki
- Lyrics – Ayumi Hamasaki
- Mixing – Naoki Yamada
- Music – Tetsuya Yukumi
- Producer – Max Matsuura
- Violin – Yu Manabe, Yuko Kajitani
