= Rainbow (Ayumi Hamasaki album) =

Studio album by Ayumi Hamasaki
- Released: December 18, 2002
- Recorded: 2002
- Studio: Prime Sound Studio; Avex Studio Azabu; Avex Studio; JVC Victor Studio; Crescente Studio; ABS Recording; Prime Sound Studio Form; On Air Azabu Studio; Hitokuchizaka Studio
- Genre: Pop; electronic; trip hop
- Length: 71:42
- Label: Avex Trax
- Producer: Max Matsuura

Ayumi Hamasaki chronology
| I Am... (2002) | Rainbow (2002) | A Ballads (2003) |

Singles from Rainbow
- 1. "Free & Easy" Released: April 24, 2002; 2. "H" Released: July 24, 2002; 3. "Voyage" Released: September 26, 2002

Rainbow (stylized as RINBOW) is the fifth studio album by Japanese recording artist Ayumi Hamasaki, released on 18 December 2002 by Avex Trax. Production of Rainbow had commenced after the release of Hamasaki's fourth studio album I Am... that January; All lyrics were written by Hamasaki, and Japanese producer Max Matsuura returned to produce the album. The album was Hamasaki's first to feature conversational English lyrics, where in her previous works she had only used single words.

Channelling pop and trip hop music, Rainbow focuses on lighter themes that were established on her previous album. Some songs focus on loneliness, sadness and relationships, while the rest talk about happiness, having fun and nostalgia. Critics' opinions of the album were generally favourable; the composition and lyrical content were commended. However, some critics dismissed Hamasaki's vocals and Matsuura's production. Upon its release, the album entered the Oricon Albums Chart at number one with first week sales of over one million units, becoming her fifth album to reach the top spot, her fourth to debut there, and her fourth to sell over one million copies in its debut week. Rainbow is the 89th highest-selling Japanese album of all time.

Hamasaki promoted the album by releasing three singles: "Free & Easy", "H", and "Voyage". All three reached number one, with "Free & Easy" becoming the first of a record breaking twenty-five consecutive number one singles, a streak that did not break until 2013, when her single "Feel the Love/Merry-Go-Round" stalled at number five. All of the singles except "H" were accompanied by a short music video. Hamasaki performed several tracks from the album in several television appearances in 2002 and 2003, and has performed some of the album's songs on several concert tours and countdown live shows.

== Background and development ==
“And you know, nobody feels sad when they see a rainbow, right? It’s always like, 'Oh, a rainbow!'—and it makes you feel happy somehow. I want to be like that, or rather, I want to be that kind of presence. Even if I can’t always be right next to everyone, I hope that when people see me, they feel the same way they do when they see a rainbow. That’s why I decided to call it Rainbow.”

—Hamasaki explaining why she named the album Rainbow.

On January 1, 2002, Hamasaki released her fourth studio album I Am... on Avex Trax. The album saw a new direction for Hamasaki, whose first three studio albums were dominated by a pop rock sounds, with lyrics based on loneliness, confusion, sadness, relationships and individualism. After being affected emotionally by the September 11 attacks, Hamasaki changed the planned music direction for I Am..., and updated the album cover to support world peace. The album was Hamasaki's first to focus on lighter themes, such as faith, humanity, and serenity. I Am... was a commercial success, topping the charts, selling around 2.3 million copies in Japan, and eventually certified triple million by the RIAJ.

While promoting I Am..., Hamasaki performed for the first time outside Japan at the MTV Asia Awards 2002 in Singapore. The performance was broadcast to 130 million homes across Asia, and it has been seen as an influencing factor for Japanese musical acts to perform more overseas. After this experience, Hamasaki felt that writing lyrics in Japanese alone was no longer enough to convey her message to the scale of her audience.

When asked about Rainbow's overall concept, the artist stated: "Everyone has seen a rainbow, but nobody has been able to reach one. I wanted to create a box of dreams... Something that will never fade, no matter how close you get. I hope that those who listen to it will be happy."

== Composition ==
“The lyrics to ["July 1st"] are cheerful, and the melody has some spots that are subdued and others that come out and grab you. This was the first time I had ever written a song from this viewpoint, and I even surprised myself! (Laughs)”

—Hamasaki discussing "July 1st", the tenth track on the album.

Like her previous album, Hamasaki focused on balancing lighter and darker themes for the album content; several tracks on the album talk about happiness, loneliness, nostalgia, love, joy, and memories. Max Matsuura returned as the album's primary producer. All songs were recorded in Japan through March to November 2002, and were mastered by Shigeo Miyamoto at FLAIR.

The introduction, "Everlasting Dream", is an instrumental piece. Composer CMJK said he was inspired by a phrase he used in creating the song, which was “No rain, no rainbow … If it doesn't rain (heartache), you won't see a rainbow (beauty and happiness).” Lyrics were written for the song, but were removed in the final piece. "We Wish" is an uptempo pop rock song; "We Wish" was also the original title for the album, but Hamasaki ultimately felt that it didn't work well. The third track "Real Me", which is the first song to feature full phrases in English, is a string-based R&B song that was compared to the work of American recording artist Aaliyah. The lyrics to "Real Me" deal with feminism and female empowerment. "Free & Easy" incorporates instrumentations of horns and flutes, utilizing a soft and “airy” sound. "Heartplace" is an electronic rock song. The original version was straightforward hard rock sounds, but when Hamasaki added English lyrics, she felt it needed to be re-composed.

“It is reminiscent of the UK trip-hop/dub sound yet has a somewhat nostalgic feeling. I have the sense that [Ayumi] was looking for expression that can move outside the domestic market when she created this song.”

—Avex Trax director Yasuyuki Tomita commenting on "Hanabi's musical structure.

Both "Over" and "Hanabi" are trip hop songs that showcase higher notes performed by Hamasaki, with the first dealing with friendships and the latter discussing nostalgia. The lyrics for "Over" were written in a hotel room, but Hamasaki had a hard time deciding on the English for the bridge melody. After the “magical” instrumental "Taskinillusion", the ninth track "Everywhere Nowhere" is inspired by uptempo 80s-inspired dance-rock music. The tenth track "July 1st" is a “summery” dance-pop song. The title was inspired by a party she attended a day before, highlighting how fireworks from America's July 4 celebrations reflected the mood she was in. The lyrics are about making fun experiences and memories with friends.

The mid-tempo trip hop "Dolls" was inspired by an unnamed film by Japanese director Takeshi Kitano. The trip hop inspired instrumental piece "Neverending Dreams" leads on from "Everlasting Dream". "Voyage" talks about equality between women and men. The composition of "Close to You" is inspired by Christmas music, and the final track "Independent" is an uptempo pop rock song. A hidden track titled "+" is placed at the end of "Independent".

The album's titular track's instrumental could be heard by accessing a URL included in the first press edition; Hamasaki requested listeners to send feedback on the demo, and said the final lyrics would be written as a combination of all the messages she received. The final version was later included on the compilation release A Ballads (2003).

== Singles ==
The album's lead single "Free & Easy" was released on April 24, 2002. The song received positive reviews from music critics, who highlighted it as an album stand out. The song was a success in Japan, reaching number one and was certified platinum by the Recording Industry Association of Japan (RIAJ) for shipments of 400,000 units. Wataru Takeishi commissioned the music video, which features Hamasaki and was inspired by Joan of Arc. "Free & Easy" was also used as the commercial song for Panasonic's MD stereo system “PM57MD.”

The album's second single was released as an extended play titled "H", featuring the tracks "Independent", "July 1st" and "Hanabi". Released on July 24, it received positive reviews from music critics who highlighted the song's production and composition. The song reached number one on the Oricon Singles Chart and was certified as having hit a million sales by the RIAJ. It remains Hamasaki's final million-certified single to date. It occupied the top spot on the 2002 Annual Oricon Singles Chart, Hamasaki's first and only single to achieve this, and was the only Japanese single that year to sell a million copies. (Note: For the 2002 Annual Oricon Yearly single chart, there has been a debate regarding the position off H being placed at number one or number two, with Japanese broadcasting network Tokyo Broadcasting System placing the EP at number two, just behind Chitose Hajime's single "Wadatsumi no Ki" at number one. However, the most reliable source to provide its position at number one is American music magazine Billboard, who confirmed that H was the only millionth selling single that year, prompting it to be the highest-selling single that year and making it number one.) The song "Hanabi" was a commercially successful sleeper hit, being certified gold by the RIAJ in January 2015, for selling 100,000 legal downloads since its release twelve and a half years prior. "Independent" was used as the image song for Nippon Television Network's "The Baseball 2002," "July 1st" was used in a Kosé Visée commercials promoting cosmetics, and "Hanabi" was used by Tu-Ka in a commercial for promoting "funstyle" model cellphones.

The album's third and final single "Voyage" was released on September 26. The track was used as the theme song for the TBS dorama My Little Chef. It received positive reviews from music critics, who commended the composition and lyrical content. It reached number one on the Oricon Singles Chart and was certified triple platinum by the RIAJ, her highest-selling single underneath the million threshold. A short film was directed by Isao Yukisada and featured Hamasaki as a princess in ancient Japan. The DVD was released and featured the video. All of the singles from Rainbow were awarded the Song of the Year award at the 2003 Japan Gold Disc Awards.

Although it was never retailed as a single, "Real Me" received a music video that was directed by Kamimura Ukon. Chiharu and Etsu from TRF make an appearance as guest dancers. The video for "Real Me" shows Hamasaki singing at a console; meanwhile, Chiharu and Etsu enter a facility full of mannequins. "Real Me" reached 22nd place on Taiwan's Hit FM Top 100 Singles of the Year chart for 2003.

== Promotion and release ==
Rainbow was released on December 18, 2002 by Avex Trax. It was released in Taiwan by Avex Taiwan and in China by Avex and the China Record Shanghai Corporation (CRSC). A DVD of Rainbow was released in Japan on July 9, 2003.

The album cover visuals were directed by Shinichi Hara and photographed by Leslie Kee. It depicts a blue-hued Hamasaki in a pool of water, rainbow-colored highlights in her hair. Shooting took place in New York in September 2002. At this point in her career, Hara had been Hamasaki's creative director for promotional visuals since 1998. His final work was directing the cover for Hamasaki's 2009 single "Sunrise/Sunset (Love Is All)".

To promote Rainbow, Hamasaki performed on several tours and concert shows; the first was her Ayumi Hamasaki Arena Tour 2002 A. The album was also promoted during Ayumi Hamasaki Stadium Tour 2002 A, Ayumi Hamasaki Countdown Live 2002–2003 A and Ayumi Hamasaki Arena Tour 2003–2004 A, and her music videos for "Free & Easy", "Voyage" and other album promotional footage were featured on her 2004 video box set Ayumi Hamasaki Complete Clip Box A. Several tracks from Rainbow appeared as remixed versions on her 2003 compilation series: RMX Works from Ayu-mi-x 5 Non-Stop Mega Mix, RMX Works from Cyber Trance Presents Ayu Trance 3, and RMX Works from Super Eurobeat Presents Ayu-ro Mix 3.

== Reception ==
Professional ratings
Review scores
| Source | Rating |
|---|---|
| AllMusic | 4/5 stars |
| CD Journal | (positive) |
| Sputnikmusic | 3/5 stars |

Rainbow received favorable reviews from most music critics. A staff member from CD Journal commented, "The fifth album, which includes hit singles such as 'Voyage' and 'Free & Easy.' Marking a departure from the heavy guitar sound of earlier works, it succeeds in visually portraying motifs of 'future,' 'hope,' and 'light' through extensive use of digital soundscapes. Its airy pop sensibility is particularly striking."

Rainbow was the first written review for Hamasaki by American journalist Adam Greenberg for AllMusic. Awarding it four stars out of five, he commented that “Rainbow came after a string of high-charting albums, itself not reaching the same heights thanks to some interesting but uneven experimentation with her sound.” Although he criticized the production and certain fillers, he concluded “The album doesn't have as much refinement as much of Hamasaki's later albums, but it shows the progression of her skills and vocal abilities.” He listed Rainbow as one of Hamasaki's best albums, alongside Secret (2005) and Ayu-mi-x 6: Silver (2008). On Sputnikmusic, the album received a 3.0/5 (“good”), with the reviewer acknowledging Hamasaki’s ability to challenge Western preconceptions of J-pop but also pointing out that some tracks felt less compelling.

Rainbow was also a massive commercial success, entering the Oricon Albums Chart at number one with 1,016,482 copies sold in its first week. It stayed at number one for two consecutive weeks, with 571,027 copies sold in its second week of availability. Rainbow stayed in the top ten for five weeks and in the top 300 chart for twenty-two weeks in total. Selling over 1.8 million units in Japan, the album was certified double million by the Recording Industry Association of Japan (RIAJ) for shipments of two million units in January 2003. It finished as the second best-selling album in Japan of 2003, trailing behind Chemistry's Second to None. The DVD edition entered at number 220 on the Oricon Albums Chart.

Rainbow is Hamasaki's fifth highest-selling studio album according to Oricon; the DVD version is her fifty-third best-selling album. The album is currently the eighty-ninth best-selling Japanese album of all time, with total sales of 1.85 million units.

== Track listing ==
All lyrics are written by Ayumi Hamasaki.

| No. | Title | Music | Arranger(s) | Length |
|---|---|---|---|---|
| 1. | "Everlasting Dream" | CMJK | CMJK | 1:33 |
| 2. | "We Wish" | D.A.I | HΛL | 5:10 |
| 3. | "Real Me" | D.A.I | CMJK | 5:26 |
| 4. | "Free & Easy" | Ayumi Hamasaki + D.A.I (Note: Crea is the pseudonym of Ayumi Hamasaki.) | HΛL | 5:00 |
| 5. | "Heartplace" | Ayumi Hamasaki | Tasuku | 6:06 |
| 6. | "Over" | CMJK | Toshiharu Umesaki, Atsushi Sato | 5:05 |
| 7. | "Hanabi" | Ayumi Hamasaki + D.A.I | CMJK | 4:56 |
| 8. | "Taskinillusion" (instrumental) | Tasuku | Tasuku | 1:20 |
| 9. | "Everywhere Nowhere" | Pop | CMJK | 4:35 |
| 10. | "July 1st" | Ayumi Hamasaki + D.A.I | Tasuku | 4:22 |
| 11. | "Dolls" | Ayumi Hamasaki | HΛL | 5:56 |
| 12. | "Neverending Dream" (instrumental) | Umesaki, Yuta Nakano | HΛL | 1:35 |
| 13. | "Voyage" | Ayumi Hamasaki + D.A.I | Ken Shima | 5:08 |
| 14. | "Close to You" | Ayumi Hamasaki | Seiji Kameda | 5:47 |
| 15. | "Independent+" ("+" is a hidden track) | Ayumi Hamasaki + D.A.I | Tasuku | 9:53 |

== Personnel ==
- Recording – Hiroyuki Shiotsuki, Koji Morimoto, Motohiro Tsuji, Satoshi Kumasaka, Yasuo Matsumoto, Yoichiro Kano, Yuichi Nagayama
- Mastering – Shigeo Miyamoto
- Directed by – Yasuyuki Tomita
- Mixing – CMJK (1), HΛL (3) (12), Koji Morimoto (6, 9, 10, 11, 14), Satoshi Kumasaka (1, 8), Yasuo Matsumoto (2, 4, 5, 7, 13, 15), Yoshiaki Onishi (3)
- Programming – CMJK (1, 3, 7), HΛL (2, 4, 11, 12), Tasuku (5, 8, 9, 10, 15), Atsushi Sato & Toshiharu Umesaki (6), Takahiro Iida & Yoshinori Kadoya (13), Nobuhiko Nakayama (14)
- Guitar – Takehito Shimizu (2, 4, 6, 12), CMJK (3, 7, 9), Masato Ishinari (3), Tasuku (5, 8, 10), Yozo Nakatsugawa (5), Norihiro Ishizuka (9), Susumu Nishikawa (10), Hirokazu Ogura (13)
- Strings – Gen Ittetsu Group (5, 13), Yuko Kajitani, Miyuki Onuma (11)
- Strings arrangement – Ken Shima (5, 13), Yuta Nakano (11)
- Backing vocals – Junko Hirotani (7, 13, 14), Andrea L. Hopkins, Daniel Morgan, Yasuhiro Kido (13), Kayoko Wada, Takao Saito (14)

== Charts ==
=== Weekly charts ===
| Chart (2002–2003) | Peak position |
|---|---|
| Japanese Albums (Oricon) | 1 |
| Singaporean Albums (RIAS) | 2 |

=== Monthly charts ===
| Chart (2003) | Peak position |
|---|---|
| Japanese Albums (Oricon) | 2 |

=== Year-end charts ===
| Chart (2003) | Position |
|---|---|
| Japanese Albums (Oricon) | 2 |

=== Decade-end charts ===
| Chart (2000–2009) | Position |
|---|---|
| Japanese Albums (Oricon) | 26 |

=== All-time chart ===
| Chart | Position |
|---|---|
| Japanese Albums (Oricon) | 89 |

== Certifications ==
| Region | Certification | Certified units/sales |
|---|---|---|
| Japan (RIAJ) | 2× Million | 1,857,870 |

== Release history ==
| Region | Date | Format | Catalogue number |
|---|---|---|---|
| Japan | December 18, 2002 | HDCD (Copy Control CD) | AVCD-17239 |
| Taiwan | 2002 | CD | AVJCD-10140 |
| Hong Kong | December 2002 | CD (Copy Control CD) | AVTCD-95655 |
| China | 2002 | CD (Copy Control CD) | AVTCD-95655/B: SCD-784 |
