= Sixxxxxx =

EP by Ayumi Hamasaki
- Released: August 5, 2015
- Recorded: 2015
- Genre: J-pop
- Length: 27:30
- Label: Avex Trax
- Producer: Max Matsuura

Ayumi Hamasaki chronology
A One (2015)	Sixxxxxx (2015)	Winter Diary: A7 Classical (2015)

Singles from Sixxxxxx
- 1. "Step by Step" Released: July 1, 2015

Sixxxxxx is the sixth extended play by Japanese recording artist and songwriter Ayumi Hamasaki. The EP was released on August 5, 2015, by Avex Trax and was produced by long-time collaborator Max Matsuura. With all the tracks written by Hamasaki herself, the EP features five original tracks and one hidden track to commemorate the "six" tracks. It was released as a stand-alone CD, a CD and DVD bundle, a CD and Blu-ray bundle, and a gatefold vinyl.

== Background ==
In April 2015, Hamasaki released her sixteenth studio album A One. Comprised with thirteen newly recorded tracks, Hamasaki stated in an interview that the album was her most personal and passionate album. Despite this, the album missed the top spot and reached number four on the Japanese Oricon Albums Chart and has sold over 52,000 units in Japan. She promoted the album during her Arena Tour 2015 A: Cirque de Minuit. In mid-April 2015 while she was on tour, Hamasaki confirmed work of a sixth extended play.

The EP's lead single, "Step by Step," was announced in April. Eventually it was announced that the song would be used as the theme song for the NHK drama Bijo to Danshi, starring Yukie Nakama. The song was released as an exclusively digital single on July 1, 2015, with July 1st serving as a digital B-side. It charted for three weeks and sold 28,432 units and in its first week it charted at number two.

The artwork for Sixxxxxx premiered in early July 2015. The photoshoot was created in conjunction with Numero Tokyo Magazine, with a theme of "Ayumi Hamasaki Moto." The three covers feature close-up black and white shots of Hamasaki's face. The title allegedly suggests that this is Hamasaki's sixth extended play and that it features six original tracks.

== Promotion ==
To promote the album, Hamasaki conducted the Team Ayu Limited Live Tour 2015, a concert tour that only members of her official fanclub, TeamAyu, were able to purchase and attend. This was her first TeamAyu member tour in twelve years. Hamasaki confirmed that stage production and costuming had begun and announced the tour throughout Japan, including the Osaka, Tokyo, and Fukuoka.

== Track listing ==
All lyrics are written by Ayumi Hamasaki.

CD
No.	Title	Music	Arrangement	Length
1.	"Step by Step"	Tetsuya Yukumi	Yuta Nakano	4:35
2.	"Summer Diary"	Yukumi	Nakano	4:46
3.	"Sayonara" (featuring SpeXial)	Daishi Dance	Daishi Dance	5:42
4.	"Sorrows"	Yukumi	Tasuku	4:04
5.	"Shape of Love"	Yukumi	Nakano	4:24
6.	"Sky High"	Yukumi	Nakano	3:59

DVD/Blu-Ray
No.	Title	Length
1.	"Step by Step"
2.	"Sayonara feat. SpeXial"
3.	"Summer Diary"
4.	"Step by step (making clip)"
5.	"Sayonara feat. SpeXial (making clip)"
6.	"Summer diary (making clip)"

== Charts ==
Chart	Peak position	Debut sales	Total sales
Oricon Daily Chart	1	17,315	55,000 (11 weeks)
Oricon Weekly Chart	2	30,988	55,000 (11 weeks)
Oricon Yearly Chart	106	44,140	55,000 (11 weeks)
