= Ayumi Hamasaki Countdown Live 2004–2005 A =

Video by Ayumi Hamasaki
- Released: 2005
- Recorded: 2004–2005
- Genre: J-pop

Ayumi Hamasaki chronology
Ayumi Hamasaki Arena Tour 2003-2004 A (2004)	Ayumi Hamasaki Countdown Live 2004–2005 A (2005)	Ayumi Hamasaki Arena Tour 2005 ~My Story~ (2005)

Ayumi Hamasaki Countdown Live 2004–2005 A is a DVD issued by Japanese singer Ayumi Hamasaki of a new year's eve show. It is well known for its performance of Trauma in which Hamasaki forgets the lyrics.

== Track listing ==
1. Whatever
2. Immature
3. Fly High
4. Duty
5. M
6. Carols
7. Evolution
8. Flower Garden
9. Audience
10. Independent
11. Trauma
12. Inspire

=== Encore ===
1. Walking Proud
2. To Be
3. Key: Eternal Tie ver.
4. Humming 7/4
5. Boys & Girls
6. Winding Road
