= Ayumi Hamasaki Complete Clip Box A =

Video by Ayumi Hamasaki
- Released: February 25, 2004
- Genre: J-pop
- Label: Avex
- Producer: Max Matsuura

Ayumi Hamasaki chronology
Ayumi Hamasaki Countdown Live 2002-2003 A (2003)	Ayumi Hamasaki Complete Clip Box A (2004)	Ayumi Hamasaki A Museum: 30th Single Collection Live (2003)

Ayumi Hamasaki Complete Clip Box A, by Ayumi Hamasaki, was released on February 25, 2004.

Ayumi Hamasaki Complete Clip Box A is a DVD box set compiling all of Hamasaki Ayumi's PVs from 1998 to 2003 on three discs. It also includes various commercials advertising the release of her singles and albums.

== Track listing ==
=== Disc 1 ===
1. Poker Face
2. You
3. Trust
4. For My Dear...
5. Depend on You
6. A Song for XX (TV-CM A Song for XX version)
7. A Song for XX (TV-CM Powder Snow version)
8. A Song for XX (TV-CM 5 singles version)
9. Whatever: Version M
10. Whatever: Version J (TV-CM)
11. Ayu-mi-x (TV-CM)
12. Love: Destiny
13. To Be
14. Boys & Girls
15. A (TV-CM)
16. A Film for XX (TV-CM)
17. Appears
18. Loveppears (TV-CM New York version)
19. Loveppears (TV CM 6 singles version)
20. Kanariya

=== Disc 2 ===
1. Fly High
2. A Clips (TV-CM)
3. Ayu-mi-x II (TV-CM)
4. Vogue / Far Away / Seasons
5. Surreal
6. Duty (TV-CM Panther version)
7. Duty (TV-CM 6 tracks version)
8. Audience (TV-CM)
9. M
10. Evolution
11. Never Ever (Promotional Clip)
12. Ayu-mi-x III (TV-CM)
13. A Best (TV-CM X7)
14. Endless Sorrow
15. Unite! (Promotional Clip)
16. Dearest
17. Dearest (Acoustic Piano Version)
18. I am... (TV-CM I am... version)
19. I am... (TV-CM 6 singles version)
20. Connected

=== Disc 3 ===
1. Ayu-mi-x 4 (TV-CM)
2. Daybreak
3. Free & Easy
4. H (TV-CM)
5. Voyage
6. Rainbow (TV-CM Rainbow version)
7. Rainbow (TV-CM 5 tracks version)
8. Real Me
9. Rainbow
10. A Ballads (TV-CM X6)
11. & / Ourselves
12. & / Grateful Days
13. & / Hanabi: Episode II
14. Forgiveness
