= H (Ayumi Hamasaki EP) =

2002 EP by Ayumi Hamasaki

Single by Ayumi Hamasaki

from the album Rainbow
- Released: July 24, 2002
- Genre: Pop rock, electronica ("Independent"); dance-pop, disco, Eurodance ("July 1st"); pop, trip hop ("Hanabi")
- Length: 28:29
- Label: Avex Trax
- Songwriter: Ayumi Hamasaki
- Producer: Max Matsuura

Ayumi Hamasaki singles chronology
"Free & Easy" (2002)	"H" (2002)	"Voyage" (2002)

H is an EP by Japanese recording artist Ayumi Hamasaki, featuring songs later included on her fifth studio album Rainbow (2002). The EP contains the songs "Independent", "July 1st", and "Hanabi", all written and co-composed by Hamasaki (under the alias Crea), alongside composer Dai Nagao and producer Max Matsuura. Hamasaki had written and recorded the three songs when she was still hurt and influenced by the September 11 attacks and the completion of her fourth studio album I Am... (2002).

The attacks influenced Hamasaki's lyrical and musical direction, and they had made her decide to create more worldly music. The EP utilizes dance and pop music, with each song being influenced by pop rock, electronica, and trip hop music. Like Rainbow, it contains ambient-influenced sounds such as handclaps and cheering. The lyrical content deals with freedom, fun, and sadness, continuing themes seen on her previous album.

The EP received mostly positive reviews from music critics, who commended the production value. Many critics praised it as being one of Hamasaki's career highlights. The EP was commercially successful in her native Japan, peaking at number one on the weekly Oricon Singles Chart. It became the only single in 2002 to sell over one million units in Japan in the same year, and was certified Million by the Recording Industry Association of Japan.

No music videos were created to promote the EP, which makes only one of three single or extended play releases by Hamasaki to lack videos (A (1999), "Unite!" (2001) and "Terminal" (2014)). However, the singles did have commercial endorsed videos by product companies that featured Hamasaki. The songs have been performed several times on her domestic and nationwide tours including A-nation and her stadium tours Ayumi Hamasaki Stadium Tour 2002 A and Ayumi Hamasaki Countdown Live 2002–2003 A.

== Background ==
On New Year's Day 2002, Hamasaki released her fourth studio album I Am... from Avex Trax. The album saw a new direction for Hamasaki, whose first three studio albums were dominated by a pop rock sound, and lyrics based on loneliness, confusion, sadness, relationships and individualism. The result was not well-received from critics, who felt the effort was "unassuming", particularly on her debut release A Song for ×× (1999). After being affected emotionally by the September 11 attacks, Hamasaki quickly changed the album's planned musical direction, and updated the album cover to support world peace. This effort was Hamasaki's first album to focus on lighter themes, such as faith, humanity and serenity. I Am... became a success and sold over 2.3 million copies in Japan, and was certified triple million by the RIAJ.

Hamasaki began work on Rainbow the same year, and intended to focus on the same themes again. While promoting I Am..., Hamasaki performed for the first time outside Japan at the 2002 MTV Asia Music Awards in Singapore. Her performance has been seen as an influencing factor for Japanese musical acts to begin performing overseas. At the ceremony, Hamasaki felt that by only writing Japanese lyrics, she was not able to bring her "message" to other countries and decided to write in English. Rainbow contained three songs with English lyrics; "Real Me", "Heartplace" and "Over". Despite this, none of the three songs on H feature English lyrics.

Three months before the release of H, Hamasaki released her first single from Rainbow, "Free & Easy", on April 24, 2002. The song received positive reviews from critics and was a commercial success, peaking at number one on the Oricon Charts and selling over 400,000 copies.

== Recording and production ==
The September 11 attacks influenced Hamasaki's writing for her studio albums I Am... and Rainbow. I Am... focused on world peace and political aspects and featured "A Song Is Born", a song particularly influenced by the event which had been included on Song Nation, a non-profit album funded by her label Avex Trax for the September 11 victims. The song itself sold over 400,000 units in Japan and the profits were donated towards the American government to help with the damages.

"The lyrics to [July 1st] are cheerful, and the melody has some spots that are subdued and others that come out and grab you. This was the first time I had ever written a song from this viewpoint, and I even surprised myself! (Laughs)"

— Hamasaki talking about "July 1st", the second track on the EP.

Rainbow and the H tracks were recorded in Tokyo at Avex Studios, Prime Sound Studio, JVC Victor Studios, as well as at other recording studios in Japan. "Hanabi" and "Independent" was mixed by Yasuo Matsumoto, while "July 1st" was mixed by Koji Morimoto. In order to expand her creative control, she had composed nine tracks on Rainbow and subsequently co-composed all the tracks from H. "Independent" was the first song recorded for the studio album. Avex Trax director Yasuyuki Tomita and Hamasaki had discussed having a song with a baseball theme. While she was convinced by his idea, Tomita later reconsidered the idea and scrapped it. Japanese producer Dai Nagao, who had co-composed Hamasaki's album Loveppears, thought of a similar concept and suggested the idea to Hamasaki, which she accepted. The single version of "Independent" was not featured on Rainbow; instead, a version of the song titled "Independent+" was included as a hidden track. This was the third time Hamasaki had included a song as a hidden track, after "Kanariya" on Loveppears (1999). The song discusses independence and adulthood.

The second track, "July 1st" was composed by Nagao and Hamasaki. Japanese disc jockey Cool-K also included additional scratching on the track. As H was released during the Japanese summer, Hamasaki decided to incorporate a "summer vibe" to the tracks and, according to Tomita, "July 1st" was her strongest song to feature this. These themes had also been explored throughout I Am.... The lyrical content is "uplifting and cheerful" and talks about fun experiences; Hamasaki commented, "This was the first time I had ever written a song ["July 1st"] from this viewpoint, and I even surprised myself!" "Hanabi" talks about Hamasaki's views of the world, and discusses personal nostalgia. Hamasaki wanted the songs to be deeper, and Tomita commented that "Hanabi" was the first time he saw Hamasaki feel more engaged with global artists and incorporating those influences, rather than simply being influenced by Japanese music. "Hanabi"'s title was written in English characters, and is the Japanese word for fireworks. The title was re-used on her single & for the track "Hanabi (Episode II)".

== Musical styles ==
"It is reminiscent of the UK trip hop/dub sound yet has a somewhat nostalgic feeling. I have the sense that [Ayumi] was looking for expression that can move outside the domestic market when she created this song."

— Avex Trax director Yasuyuki Tomita commenting on "Hanabi's musical structure.

H incorporates different genres including trip hop, dance-rock and electronica. "Independent" is a pop rock song with elements of modern electronica. The song features more "relaxed" vocals and "softer" lyrical content. According to Tomita, Hamasaki had placed microphones in Tokyo Dome during one of her concerts, to recorded the audience's voices and "cheerleader" hand claps, as a way to incorporate inspiration from her fans.

"July 1st" is a Eurodance and dance-pop influenced song. According to CDJournal, the song starts with a "natural breezy" guitar flow. "Hanabi" is inspired by British trip hop and dub music, and is also strongly influenced by ambient music. The song's lyrical content and composition were based on the theme of nostalgia, which Hamasaki felt was one of her more deep songs. She felt that putting "Hanabi" after "July 1st" was perfect because it interrupted the emotions created by the "summery vibe" of "July 1st"; Hamasaki herself had stated that her idea was to create "a summer that ends in deep sadness." Tomita felt that Hamasaki was trying to move outside of the Japanese domestic market by incorporating British trip hop influences.

== Cover art ==
The cover sleeve was directed by Shinichi Hara. Shinichi has been Hamasaki's creative director for photoshoots, album and single sleeves, and began collaborating with her in 1998 with her on her debut album. His final work was directing the sleeve for Hamasaki's 2009 single "Sunrise/Sunset (Love Is All)". The photographer, Keita Haginiwa, directed the photoshoot, which featured Hamasaki on a beach front. On different versions of the cover artwork, Hamasaki is accompanied by the male model Atsuko Kubota, who professionally goes by the name Minori. The artwork features Hamasaki sitting on a Harley Davidson in front of a beach, leaning and smiling away from the camera.

H has five different sleeves featuring photos from the same shoot. All of these were housed in a transparent jewel case. The next three covers contained limited-edition colours; a pink edition, a green edition and a blue edition, all with different cover artwork with a border of each colour. All physical editions featured an additional black and white lyric sheet, a post card from Avex Trax and a Japanese Windows Media Player promotion flyer. All tracks were listed the same and were protected by the Copy Control Association. After the EP achieved one million sales in November 2002, Avex Trax re-released the EP as a digipak, containing all the colored covers inside, and used the original artwork for the front display.

== Release ==
H was digitally released worldwide with the original artwork. Each song has been featured on several greatest hits compilation albums by Hamasaki. For "Independent," it was featured on A Best 2 (2007), A Complete: All Singles (2008) and A Summer Best (2009). For "July 1st," it was featured on her A Best 2 and A Summer Best compilation and the final track "Hanabi" was featured on A Ballads (2004), A Best 2 and A Summer Best. For the A Best 2 series, which the first two tracks were featured on the white version and the latter track on the black version. All of the songs from H were remastered in Los Angeles, California by Bernie Grundman and Brian "Big Bass" Gardner, in order to have a "more powerful" feel on the compilation. "July 1st" was re-released as the b-side single for Hamasaki's 2015 digital single "Step by Step."

== Reception ==
=== Critical reception ===
Professional ratings
Review scores
Source	Rating
Allmusic	(positive)
CD Journal	(favorable)
Yahoo! Music	(favorable)

H received favorable reviews from most music critics. Adam Greenberg from Allmusic reviewed the parent album Rainbow and favoured "Independent" and "Hanabi," but failed to mention "July 1st." He felt that "Hanabi" "focuses strongly on her vocal qualities as well as some interesting phrasing [...]," while he concluded that the song "Close to You" "[...] never quite gets off the ground, especially when compared to the ending track, ["Independent,"]" Greenberg, who had written the extended biography of Hamasaki on the same website, had listed "Hanabi" as one of her career standouts. CDJournal had reviewed each track on their mini-review. For "Independent," the reviewer called it an "upper dance tune" and felt the song sounded "aggressive." For the second track, the reviewer commended the song's composition and production and called it a "summery, refreshing dance tune." However, slight criticism was directed on the chorus that needed "minor adjustment." For the third track, the reviewer felt that the song expressed the sadness of the end of summer through a Japanese fireworks motif, and praised her freely expressed world view.

Tetsuo Hiraga from Hot Express commended the tracks. Regarding "July 1st" and "Independent," Hiraga praised the songs for showing positive messages and having more personality drawn towards the songs and said the songs had shown more "respect." Regarding "Hanabi," Hiraga commended the sadder songs which also included "Over." Hiraga exemplified the lyric ("There's never a day that I have/To remember you because/I never for a moment forgot you.") for being one of his favorite lyrics on the album.

Hamasaki hosted an online voting poll for fans to choose their favorite tracks to be featured on her Ayumi Hamasaki 15th Anniversary Tour Best Live Tour. As a result, all three songs from H were featured on the list. H won the Song of the Year Award at the Japan Gold Disc Awards in 2003, alongside "Free & Easy" and "Voyage."

=== Commercial response ===
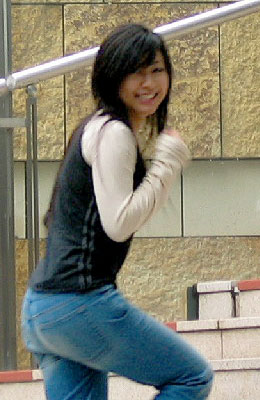
Hikaru Utada (pictured), who claimed the annual number one with "Can You Keep a Secret?" the previous year, came second behind Hamasaki's H.

H debuted at number one on the Oricon Singles Chart and peaked at number one for three nonconsecutive weeks, including its debut week, its second week and its fourth week on the chart, with the third week being occupied by Misia's single "Nemurenu Yoru wa Kimi no Sei." The single stayed in the top ten for seven weeks, slipping to number thirteen in its eighth week. The single lasted thirteen weeks inside the top forty and ultimately finished its charting run at number sixty-three in its nineteenth week. With a total of nineteen weeks in the singles chart, it has become Hamasaki's second-longest charting single since "Seasons," which charted for over twenty weeks. "H" also debuted at number one on Tokyo Broadcasting System's (TBS) Count Down TV chart during the chart week of August 3, 2002, her thirteenth single to do so.

H sold over one million units in Japan and was certified Million by the Recording Industry Association of Japan (RIAJ) in November 2002 for shipments of one million units. This became the best-performing single of the year in Japan and surpassed Hikaru Utada's 2002 single "Traveling" which sold over 850,000 units throughout the year. "Traveling" and H were the only singles of the year to be certified for one million copies shipped by RIAJ. (Note: Although H and "Traveling" were certified million by Recording Industry Association of Japan (RIAJ), "Traveling" also achieved a gold certification for 100,000 digital sales.) Overall, H was the only single to sell over one million units that year and became Hamasaki's first and only single to be the yearly number one. (Note: For the 2002 Annual Oricon Yearly single chart, there has been a debate regarding the position off H being placed at number one or number two, with Japanese broadcasting network Tokyo Broadcasting System placing the EP at number two, just behind Chitose Hajime's single "Wadatsumi no Ki" at number one. However, the most reliable source to provide its position at number one is American music magazine Billboard, who confirmed that H was the only millionth selling single that year, prompting it to be the highest-selling single that year and making it number one.) H charted at number 2 on TBS' Annual Chart, right behind Chitose Hajime's single "Wadatsumi no Ki." According to Oricon sales, H is Hamasaki's fifth-best-selling single in her musical career, behind A, "Seasons," "M" and "Boys & Girls."

H also remains Hamasaki's last single to sell over one million units and is the only million-selling single on Rainbow. It is her fourth single to sell over one million physical units, after "Boys & Girls" and A from Loveppears (1999), "Seasons" from Duty (2000) and "M" from I Am.... Hamasaki's last highest-selling single close to the one million physical sales mark was the next single "Voyage" which peaked at number one, but only sold an estimated 679,000 units in Japan and was certified double platinum. (Note: All singles listed received a million certification by RIAJ for physical sales, but Hamasaki also received two additional million sales certification for ringtone downloads: "Carols" and "Heaven.")

The song "Hanabi" was a commercially successful sleeper hit, becoming certified gold by the Recording Industry Association of Japan in January 2015, for selling 100,000 legal downloads since its release twelve and a half years prior.

== Promotion ==
The H tracks did not receive a music video. This was her first EP single since A (1999) and her first single since "Unite!" (2001) that did not feature videos. (Note: Both EP singles A and H did not receive any music videos, apart from commercial endorsed videos. Her third and EP single, &, however, did; All three singles "Grateful Days," "Ourselves" and "Hanabi (Episode II)" received a music video.) This was her last single release that did not feature a music video until her October 2014 single "Terminal."

Each song from the H EP were released through endorsement deals. For "Independent," the song was on Nippon TV for the program The Baseball. This was the only commercial that Hamasaki was not present on. For "July 1st," Hamasaki was featured with the song on a lipstick commercial for KOSE Visee make-up in Japan. For "Hanabi," the song was used as a cellphone advert in Japan.

== Live performances ==
Hamasaki has performed the three songs on several of her Asian-based tours;

- Ayumi Hamasaki Arena Tour 2002 A ("Independent")
- Ayumi Hamasaki Stadium Tour 2002 A (All tracks)
- Ayumi Hamasaki Countdown Live 2002–2003 A (All tracks)
- Ayumi Hamasaki Arena Tour 2003–2004 A ("Independent")
- Ayumi Hamasaki Countdown Live 2004–2005 A ("Independent")
- Tour of Secret ("Independent")
- Ayumi Hamasaki Asia Tour 2008: 10th Anniversary ("Hanabi" and "Independent")
- Ayumi Hamasaki Premium Countdown Live 2008–2009 A ("Independent")
- Premium Showcase: Feel the Love ("July 1st")

== Personnel ==
Credits adapted from the EP's liner notes.

=== Song credits ===
- Ayumi Hamasaki – songwriting, composition, vocal production, additional production (All tracks)
- Dai Nagao – composition (All tracks)
- Yasuyuki Tomita – A&R
- Shigeo Miyamoto – mastering, engineering
- Shinji Hayashi – additional production
- Max Matsuura – executive producer, vocal production, additional production

=== Cover credits ===
- Shinichi Hara – art direction
- Shigeru Kasai and Takuma Noriage – design
- Naoki Ueda – creative coordinator
- Keita Haginiwa – photographer
- Koji Matsumoto – fashion director
- Fumihara Minoshima – stylist
- Keizo Kuroda and Takahiro Yamashita – hair assistant and make-up stylist
- Kanako Miura – nail artist
- Atsuko Kubota – stand in
- Katsutaka Numakura – transportation assistant

== Track listing ==
All lyrics are written by Ayumi Hamasaki.

No.	Title	Music	Arranger(s)	Length
1.	"Independent"	Crea + D.A.I	Tasuku	4:57
2.	"July 1st"	Crea + D.A.I	Tasuku	4:22
3.	"Hanabi"	Crea + D.A.I	Cmjk	4:57
4.	"Independent (Instrumental)"	Crea + D.A.I	Tasuku	4:57
5.	"July 1st (Instrumental)"	Crea + D.A.I	Tasuku	4:22
6.	"Hanabi (Instrumental)"	Crea + D.A.I	Cmjk	4:22

== Charts ==
=== Weekly charts ===
Chart (2002)	Peak position
Japan Singles (Oricon)	1
Japan Count Down TV Chart (TBS)	1

=== Monthly charts ===
Chart (2002)	Peak position
Japan Singles (Oricon)	1

=== Year-end charts ===
Chart (2002)	Position
Japan Singles (Oricon)	1
Japan Count Down TV Chart (TBS)	2

== Certifications ==
Region	Certification	Certified units/sales
Japan (RIAJ) Physical single	Million	1,012,544

== Release history ==
List of release dates by region, including format details, and record label
Region	Date	Format	Label	Version
Japan	July 24, 2002	Copy Control Compact disc	Avex Trax	EP (original versions)
Japan	November 24, 2002	Digipak	Avex Trax	EP (original versions)
