= Winter Diary: A7 Classical =

Remix album by Ayumi Hamasaki
- Released: December 23, 2015
- Studio: Sound City, Onkio Haus Studio; Prime Sound Studio Form, Tokyo, Japan
- Genre: Classical; pop; j-pop
- Length: 49:38
- Label: Avex Trax; Avex Taiwan
- Producer: Max Matsuura

Ayumi Hamasaki chronology
sixxxxxx (2015)	Winter Diary: A7 Classical (2015)	A Best -15th Anniversary Edition- (2016)

Winter Diary: A7 Classical (stylized as: Winter diary ~A7 Classical~) is a remix compilation album by Japanese singer Ayumi Hamasaki. The album was released on December 23, 2015, in Japan under Avex Trax, and on December 31 in Taiwan under Avex Taiwan. It contains classical arrangements of ten songs personally selected by Hamasaki from her A One and Sixxxxxx albums released earlier that year, plus one brand new song titled "Winter Diary". It is Hamasaki's fourth classical album overall, following 2013's A Classical.

== Background and release ==
On November 22, 2015, Hamasaki shared an in-studio photo of a new song she was working on via social media. The image teased the track's title, "Winter Diary", along with the opening words to the lyrics. It also revealed that she had written the song and Tetsuya Komuro had produced the music. Two days later, Avex officially announced details of Hamasaki's winter project album, titled Winter Diary ~A7 Classical~, and that it would be released on December 23. The tracklist of eleven songs was also revealed, with four songs taken from Sixxxxxx ("Step by Step", "Sorrows", "Summer Diary" and "Sky High"), six songs taken from A One ("Warning", "Last Minute", "No Future", "Out of Control", "The Gift", and "The Show Must Go On"), and the final track being the song she had teased only days prior and the album's namesake, "Winter Diary", written as a companion or sequel to "Summer Diary". It was also disclosed that popular violinist Okabe Machi featured on the tracks "Warning", "No Future", and "The Show Must Go On". The official cover artwork for the album was revealed on November 30. Audio excerpts from three of the newly arranged songs were posted on Hamasaki's official YouTube account as further teasers prior to release day: "Winter Diary" on December 10, "Step by Step" on December 11, and "Last Minute" on December 13.

== Promotion ==
Hamasaki promoted the album by starting an Instagram account on December 23, 2015, that initially was only to be open for one month until January 23, 2016, but currently remains active to present day. She shared pictures of the music video shooting for "Winter Diary", which was recorded in Taiwan, and also the preparations for her Ayumi Hamasaki Countdown Live 2015-2016 A: Made In Tokyo concerts where she later performed the new song.

== Track listing ==
All lyrics are written by Ayumi Hamasaki.

No.	Title	Music	Programmed/Arranged By	Length
1.	"Warning"	Kazuhiro Hara	Takashi Ohmama	3:51
2.	"Step by Step"	Tetsuya Yukumi	Daisuke Kadowaki	4:32
3.	"Sorrows"	Tetsuya Yukumi	Yoshihiko Ishizaka	4:40
4.	"Last Minute"	Tetsuya Yukumi	Natsumi Tabuchi	4:24
5.	"Summer Diary"	Tetsuya Yukumi	Hanae Nakamura	4:25
6.	"Sky High"	Tetsuya Yukumi	Yutaka Yamada	3:51
7.	"No Future"	Tetsuya Komuro	Yuri Habuka	5:53
8.	"Out of Control"	Tetsuya Yukumi	Natsumi Tabuchi	4:49
9.	"The Gift"	JJ Lin	Hanae Nakamura	3:50
10.	"The Show Must Go On"	Tetsuya Komuro	Shu Kanematsu	6:21
11.	"Winter Diary (Original mix) [Special Track] *previously unreleased*"	Tetsuya Komuro	Yuta Nakano	5:42
Total length:				49:38

== Personnel ==
Recorded at Sound City, Onkio Haus Studio, and Prime Sound Studio Form, Tokyo, Japan. Management by Avex Trax in Tokyo, Japan.

Personnel adapted from the liner notes of the physical album.

- Hiroshi Arakawa – flute, piccolo flute
- Kohei Chida – direction (recording)
- Mariko Fukushi – bassoon
- Ayumi Hamasaki – primary vocals, lyrics
- Tomoki Ihira – guitar (track 11)
- Youta Ishizuka – assistant engineer
- Norihiko Katsumata – assistant engineer
- Hiroshi Kawasaki – mastering
- Koji Morimoto – mixing
- Hidehito Naka – clarinet
- Yuta Ohno – French horn
- Keiichiro Sato – bass trombone
- Satoshi Shoji – oboe
- Yoji Sugiyama – musician coordination
- Masaki Tanaka – French horn
- Yoshiyuki Uema – French horn
- Yutaro Wada – assistant engineer
- Hidetomo "KOME" Yoneda – direction
- Soma Yoshihara – assistant engineer

- Recorded by – Hiroshi Sato (4) (tracks: 11), Kiyoshi Okabe (tracks: 1–10)
- Snare – Shu Kanematsu, Shunichi Ihara, Yusuke Yoshida, Yutaka Yamada (track 8)
- Strings – Koichiro Muroya Strings
- Trombone – Azusa Tojo, Nobuhide Handa
- Trumpet – Kai Takaara, Yoshinori Tanuma
- Violin – Machi Okabe (tracks: 1, 7, 10), Yuko Kajitani (track 11)
- Vocals (backing) – Manami Noro, Yumi Kawamura (track 11)

== Charts ==
Chart	Peak position	Ref
Japan Daily Albums (Oricon)	5	
Japan Weekly Albums (Oricon)	11	
