= My Story (Ayumi Hamasaki album) =

Studio album by Ayumi Hamasaki
- Released: December 15, 2004
- Recorded: 2004
- Studios: Prime Sound Studio Form (Tokyo); Avex Studio Azabu (Tokyo); Sony Music Studios (Tokyo); Hitokuchizaka Studio (Tokyo); Bunkamura Studio (Tokyo); Blue One Music Studio
- Genres: Pop; pop rock
- Length: 74:37
- Label: Avex Trax
- Producer: Max Matsuura

Ayumi Hamasaki chronology
| Memorial Address (2003) | My Story (2004) | (Miss)understood (2006) |

Singles from My Story
- 1. "Moments" Released: March 31, 2004; 2. "Inspire" Released: July 28, 2004; 3. "Carols" Released: September 29, 2004

My Story (stylized in all caps) is the sixth studio album by Japanese singer-songwriter Ayumi Hamasaki, released on December 15, 2004, by Avex Trax. The album's lyrics were written in their entirety by Hamasaki herself, with composition on the album handled by a team of composers including Kazuhito Kikuchi, Bounceback, Tetsuya Yukumi, and, on some songs, Hamasaki, under the pen name Crea. The track order of this album is structured so that there are rock songs at the beginning, ballads in the middle, and pop songs at the end.

My Story was positively received by music critics, who appreciated its aggressive style compared to Western pop music at the time and its alternative sound. A commercial success, it became Hamasaki's sixth consecutive number-one album in Japan, debuting at the top spot with first week sales of over 574,000 copies. In its 43-week chart run, My Story sold 1.132 million copies and became the seventh best-selling album of the year in Japan. Combined with the sales of its three singles, My Story sold 2.073 million copies.

To promote My Story, Hamasaki released three singles from it. The lead single, "Moments", was released on March 31, 2004, to positive reviews from critics, who praised its rock influences. It was a commercial success, too, debuting at number one, selling over 300,000 copies, and receiving a platinum certification. The second single, "Inspire", was successful as well, reaching number one and being certified platinum; it sold over 329,000 units, becoming the highest-selling single from My Story. Similarly, "Carols" topped the charts in Japan and was certified Platinum. Hamasaki promoted the album by embarking on a concert tour entitled Ayumi Hamasaki Arena Tour 2005 A ~My Story~, which ran from February 1 to April 24, 2005.

== Background and production ==
“The title My Story says it all—it’s like I went back and re‑experienced everything from before my debut, even from the time I first became aware of myself, up until now, reflecting on those feelings as they were.”

— Hamasaki explaining why she named the album My Story.

By the end of her 2003–2004 arena tour, Hamasaki became dissatisfied with her position at Avex. She felt that the company was treating her as a product rather than a human being and artist. She felt that her two previous efforts, I Am… and Rainbow, had been rushed. As a result, Hamasaki decided that on her next record she would not write to "give people hope" or write "something good"; instead, she simply wrote "freely and honestly" with no set theme. These writing sessions resulted in autobiographical lyrics, exploring Hamasaki's own emotions and reminisces about her career.

The music of My Story reflects the free theme of the lyrics; its noticeable rock overtones expressed Hamasaki's liking for rock music. Hamasaki wondered if she had been able to properly convey something, so she thought there was no point in forcing herself to make an album for a year. She thought about the kind of sound she wanted to make and what she wanted to write, and as a result, initially decided to make it a mini-album; but this time, Hamasaki absolutely wanted to release a full album, so she started working on My Story at a fairly early stage. Pleased with its sound, Hamasaki declared that My Story was the first album of her career with which she felt truly satisfied.

In November 2004, karao.com confirmed that Hamasaki and her record label Avex Trax would release her first original work in about two years since Rainbow titled My Story in December 15 of the same year. Hamasaki and Avex Trax enlisted long-term collaborator, Japanese businessman and producer Max Matsuura, to produce the album; this marks Hamasaki's sixth consecutive studio album to be fully produced by Matsuura. Hamasaki begun recording the album at various recording studios in Japan in early 2004 with Koji Morimoto, Motohiro Tsuji, Satoshi Kumasaka, Shojiro Watanabe, Yasuo Matsumoto, Yuichi Nagayama and Hirokazu Fukushima. Hamasaki and Avex enlisted previous composers and arrangers for the album, such as Kazuhito Kikuchi, Bounceback and Tetsuya Yukumi; Hamasaki also composed two full-length songs and one instrumental track on the album while using her pen name CREA.

== Composition and songs ==
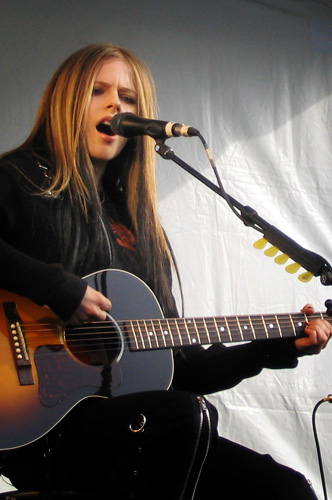
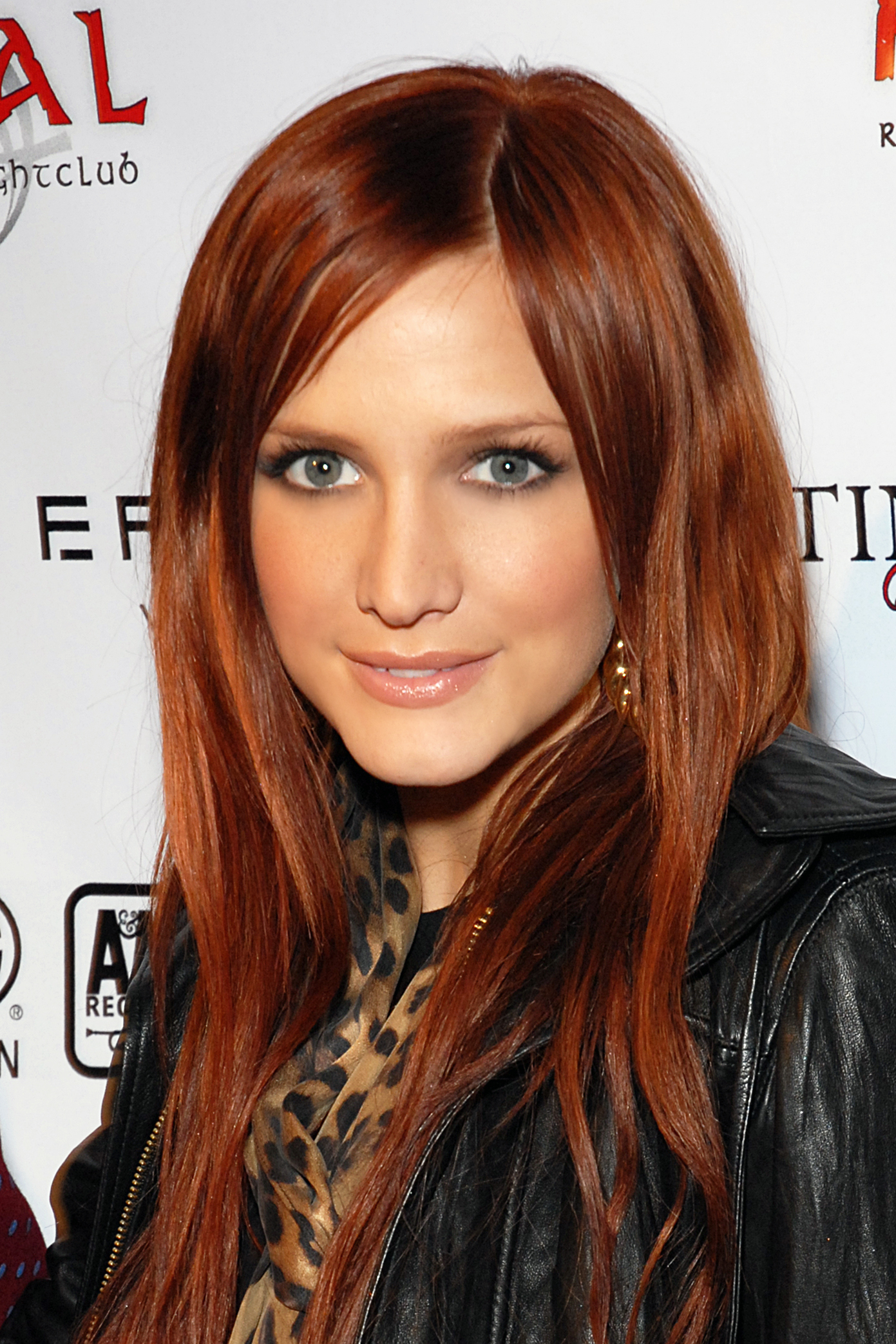
Critics compared the musical style of My Story with Avril Lavigne (left) and Ashlee Simpson (right)

My Story is a rock music album with an aggressive grit that was also present in its predecessor Memorial Address (2003). Josh Love of Stylus Magazine compared the album's sound that of popular pop rock albums in the West at the time like Avril Lavigne's Under My Skin and Ashlee Simpson's Autobiography. In an interview with Japanese magazine S Cawaii, Hamasaki said about the production of the album; "The lyrics are about my debut up until now, but rather than looking back at those times and thinking about them now, I created each song as if I was myself at that time. The atmosphere of the music is rock. But it's not just about the thickness of the sound or the sound of the guitar here or anything like that, it's more about the delicate side of women... I was conscious of that when I created it. A feminine rock kind of thing. But you can definitely dance to it when you listen to it. I was really into it and dancing during the recording (laughs)." Hamasaki also commented that she had a strong emotional attachment to all the songs featured on My Story after the album's completion.

The album opens with "Catcher in the Light," an instrumental number that develops into a humming-like fairy vocal. "About You" is a fast-paced hard rock song that has been compared to Avril Lavigne. "Game" starts with a New Age instrumental that quickly blows up into aggressive dance-rock. “My Name’s Women,” a song written from the perspective of an independent woman, has been compared to Britney Spears' "Me Against the Music." "Wonderland" is a minute and a half instrumental composed by Hamasaki herself under the pen name CREA. "Liar" is a digital rock tune that lyrically depicts struggling to wipe away her anguish and anxiety; the track has been compared to Ashlee Simpson's “La La” and Avril Lavigne's “He Wasn't.” "Hope or Pain" is a melancholic medium-tempo number. "Happy Ending" is a medium tempo tune that gives a glimpse of wetness, with a composition that features a light guitar.

"Moments" is a rock song with a gentle and emotional melody that has been compared to Guns N' Roses. "Walking Proud" is a medium tempo tune that expresses sentimental feelings that build up during the season of cherry blossoms. "Carols" is a torch song with solemn and elegant strings blending into a moist melody line. "Kaleidoscope" is a one minute and forty-nine second long instrumental. "Inspire" is an upbeat number with a Latin groove that has been compared to Mexican singer Paulina Rubio. "Honey" is a high-energy dance pop tune. "Replace" is a rock number with a pop-like feel. "Winding Road" is a medium-tempo number Hamasaki composed her under the CREA pen name. "Humming 7/4," which was also composed under the pen name CREA, features a solid guitar and swells in the drums, with a joyful chorus sounding like a standing live performance.

== Release and packaging ==
My Story was released across Asia on December 15, 2004. During its first release, four different limited edition covers were released for fans to choose from. There were also two versions released; the first that included the CD only and a second that included a DVD that contained music videos to some (including the singles) of the tracks from the album. There was a printing error in early versions of the booklet, giving an incorrect songwriting credit for the song "Honey." When the error was caught, the record label issued a small correction pamphlet to be placed in the CD case. Subsequent album pressings have the error corrected in the booklet itself. Later, the album was released in a DVD-Audio format which featured 5.1 Surround mix and all the album's videos (excluding "My Name's Women," which is only featured on the Step You/Is This Love? CD+DVD single). A limited Playbutton edition of the album was released on March 21, 2012.

All of the cover sleeves for My Story were photographed by Leslie Kee. The artwork for the standalone CD edition, the CD+DVD limited edition (A) and the Playbutton depicts a stylized, close-up shot of the singer with a dramatic, almost theatrical, look, likely with bold makeup and a strong, confident expression. The rest of the album covers are shots of Hamasaki sprawled on a bedroom floor. The art direction was helmed by Shinichi Hara, and the art design was helmed by Tomokazu Suzuki, Takuma Noriage, Hirotomi Suzumoto and Shigeru Kasai. The album's booklet gives a glimpse into Hamasaki’s private life, including bathing, putting on makeup, and her boudoir; her two dogs CREA and Marron are also photographed in a corner of the room.

== Reception ==
Professional ratings
Review scores
| Source | Rating |
|---|---|
| AllMusic | 4/5 stars |
| Stylus Magazine | B+ |
| CD Journal | (positive) |
| Hot Express | (favorable) |

My Story received mostly positive reviews from music critics. A staff reviewer from CD Journal commented; "This is her sixth album and she continues to lead the scene. In addition to her hit singles, it also contains three previously unreleased tracks that were aired on commercials. It's a masterpiece that shows the dignity of a top artist."

Neil Z. Yeung from AllMusic rated the album four out of five stars, complimenting the album's rock crunch and gritty sound and called it a worthy installment in Hamasaki's discography. Stylus Magazine writer Josh Love gave the album a B+ grade, praising Hamasaki's lyrical prowess and the songs' production value. He stated in the review; "More importantly, however, while American chart pop remains highly compartmentalized (Brit and Jojo’s dance-pop here, Ashlee and Avril’s rock moves there, the more introspective and 'serious' Vanessa Carltons somewhere else), Hamasaki gladly salts her club-ready hits with power-chord propulsion and spices up her unrepentant rock with credible beat science." Tetsuo Hiraga of Hot Express celebrated My Story as a powerful, uplifting work in his review.

My Story debuted at number one on the Oricon Albums Chart, with 574,321 copies sold in its first week. This marked her tenth number one album on the Oricon charts, making her the fifth female artist in history to have ten or more number one albums. It dropped to number three the next week, selling 194,556 copies. It spent its third week at number three, selling 190,471 copies. It slid to number four on its fourth week, selling 38,792 copies. The album stayed in the top ten one last week, ranking at number nine and selling 22,693 copies. My Story charted in the top 300 of the charts for 43 weeks. It sold 1,131,776 copies by the end of 2005, making it the seventh best-selling album of the year and the year's best-selling original album by a female artist. My Story has sold 1,132,444 copies in Japan to date, and has received a million certification by the Recording Industry Association of Japan (RIAJ). According to Oricon Style, My Story is Hamasaki's seventh best-selling album. To date, it is the 230th best-selling album of all time in the country. It is also the last million-selling album in her singing career.

== Promotion ==
In the month of December in 2004, Hamasaki performed live on Japanese TV shows several times for promotions, such as that year's FNS Music Festival and the 55th NHK Kouhaku Uta Gassen. She made her sixth annual appearance on Kōhaku Uta Gassen, singing the song "Moments" as a member of the red team. Hamasaki was also featured on the cover of a variety of different Japanese magazines during the promoting of My Story, such as ViVi, GirlPOP, Cawaii!, S cawaii, Popteen and Tokyo 1-shukan. Many of the album's tracks were used in advertisement campaigns throughout the country. "Moments" was used as the Kosé Visée commercial song. "Inspire" was used as the theme song for the Solomon R. Guggenheim Museum exhibition in New York City as well as a tie-in for avex auditions 2004. "Game" was used as the Panasonic MD stereo system "PM700MD" commercial song. "Carols" was used as the Panasonic digital camera "Lumix FX7" commercial song. "About You" was used in commercials for Morinaga & Co.'s "Bake." "My Name's Women" was used in commercials for Panasonic's "D-snap," and "Walking Proud" was used in commercials for Panasonic's Portable MD.

=== Singles ===
"Moments" was released as the lead single off My Story on March 31, 2004. It achieved success in her native Japan, peaking at number one on the Japanese Oricon Singles Chart and lasted on the chart for 21 weeks. The physical format was certified platinum by the RIAJ for shipments of 302,923 units in Japan; while the song was certified gold and double platinum for selling over 100,000 digital downloads and 500,000 ringtone downloads. The music video for "Moments" was directed by Tatsuo Inoue. It shows Hamasaki waking up at night. She opens a door where several kids are playing around in a flowery room, until the scene changes dramatically and everything is darker. Finally she ends up walking away while looking at the camera.

"Inspire" was released as the album's second single on July 28, 2004. It achieved success in Japan, debuting atop the Japanese Oricon Singles Chart and charted for 15 weeks. The song was certified gold by the RIAJ for shipments of 329,145 units, and triple platinum for ringtone sales of 750,000 units. The music video for "Inspire" was directed by Tatsuo Inoue and was filmed in Los Angeles, California. Hamasaki is walking down the city and sees a promotional poster of "Inspire" with arid earth as the promotional image. Then it shows Hamasaki going to a tropical island by raft. There she sings and dances in the ocean water with her dancers, and also does a versioned tribal dance.

"Carols" was released as the album's third and final single on September 29, 2004. The single reached number one and was certified platinum by the RIAJ for sales of 309,128 copies. Aside from its physical success, "Carols" also became Hamasaki's first song to sell one million ringtones. The music video for "Carols" was directed by Masashi Muto. It was filmed in black and white. It shows Hamasaki singing in an empty theatre.

=== Concert tours and other releases ===
Hamasaki promoted the album on her 2005 concert tour titled Ayumi Hamasaki Arena Tour 2005 A ~My Story~. Hamasaki announced the concert in January 2005. It was her nationwide tour promoting her sixth studio album My Story, and almost all the songs were performed live. It was also her first concert tour revolving around an album. The tour featured 26 shows and covered 10 different cities, running from February 1 to April 24, 2005. In all, the tour drew in about 250,000 spectators. The DVD reached number five on the Oricon DVD Chart, and charted for 24 weeks.

To promote the material from My Story, a compilation with classical versions of the songs were made for the album My Story Classical, which was released on March 24, 2005. Most of the tracks were recorded with the Lamoureux Orchestra of Paris, which was conducted by Yutaka Sado. My Story Classical debuted at number four on the Oricon Albums Chart, charted for nine weeks and sold about 81,700 copies.

== Track listing ==
All lyrics are written by Ayumi Hamasaki.

CD
| No. | Title | Music | Arranger(s) | Length |
|---|---|---|---|---|
| 1. | "Catcher in the Light" | CMJK | CMJK | 2:44 |
| 2. | "About You" | Kazuhito Kikuchi | tasuku | 3:58 |
| 3. | "Game" | Bounceback | HΛL | 4:11 |
| 4. | "My Name's Women" | Bounceback | HΛL | 5:38 |
| 5. | "Wonderland" (instrumental) | CREA (Note: Crea is the pseudonym of Ayumi Hamasaki.) | Ayumi Hamasaki | 1:34 |
| 6. | "Liar" | Raita Ikemoto | CMJK+Takahiro Izutani | 4:58 |
| 7. | "Hope or Pain" | Tetsuya Yukumi | CMJK | 4:19 |
| 8. | "Happy Ending" | Tetsuya Yukumi | CMJK | 4:42 |
| 9. | "Moments" | Tetsuya Yukumi | Hikari | 5:29 |
| 10. | "Walking Proud" | Tetsuya Yukumi | Hikari | 5:14 |
| 11. | "Carols" | Tomoya Kinoshita | CMJK | 5:29 |
| 12. | "Kaleidoscope" (instrumental) | HΛL | HΛL | 1:49 |
| 13. | "Inspire" | Tetsuya Yukumi | HΛL | 4:31 |
| 14. | "Honey" | Tetsuya Yukumi | HΛL | 5:10 |
| 15. | "Replace" | Kazuhito Kikuchi | HΛL | 5:05 |
| 16. | "Winding Road" | Ayumi Hamasaki | Hikari | 5:02 |
| 17. | "Humming 7/4" | Ayumi Hamasaki | Kotaro Kubota | 4:25 |

DVD
| No. | Title | Director | Length |
|---|---|---|---|
| 1. | "Moments" (Video Clip) | Tetsuo Inoue | 5:38 |
| 2. | "Inspire" (Video Clip) | Tetsuo Inoue | 5:37 |
| 3. | "Game" (Video Clip) | Hideaki Sunaga | 4:23 |
| 4. | "Carols" (Video Clip) | Masashi Muto | 6:15 |
| 5. | "About You" (Video Clip) | Hideaki Sunaga | 4:02 |
| 6. | "Walking Proud" (Video Clip) | Ken Sueda | 5:41 |
| 7. | "Humming 7/4" (Video Clip) | Wataru Takeishi | 4:40 |
| 8. | "Moments" (Making Off-Shot) | Tetsuo Inoue | 5:33 |
| 9. | "Inspire" (Making Off-Shot) | Tetsuo Inoue | 5:01 |
| 10. | "Game" (Making Off-Shot) | Hideaki Sunaga | 4:19 |
| 11. | "Carols" (Making Off-Shot) | Masashi Muto | 5:49 |
| Total length: | | | 56:58 |

== Charts ==
=== Weekly charts ===
| Chart (2004–2005) | Peak position |
|---|---|
| Japanese Albums (Oricon) | 1 |
| Singaporean Albums (RIAS) | 2 |

=== Monthly charts ===
| Chart (2004) | Peak position |
|---|---|
| Japanese Albums (Oricon) | 3 |

=== Year-end charts ===
| Chart (2005) | Position |
|---|---|
| Japanese Albums (Oricon) | 7 |

=== Decade-end charts ===
| Chart (2000–2009) | Position |
|---|---|
| Japanese Albums (Oricon) | 79 |

=== All-time chart ===
| Chart | Position |
|---|---|
| Japanese Albums (Oricon) | 230 |

== Sales and certifications ==
| Region | Certification | Certified units/sales |
|---|---|---|
| Japan (RIAJ) | Million | 1,132,444 |

== Release history ==
| Region | Date | Format | Catalogue number |
|---|---|---|---|
| Japan | December 15, 2004 | CD+DVD | AVCD-17610/B |
| Japan | December 15, 2004 | CD | AVCD-17611 |
| Japan | December 15, 2004 | SACD | AVGD-17676 |
| Japan | December 15, 2004 | DVD Audio | AVAD-91300 |
| Taiwan | December 17, 2004 | | |
| Hong Kong | December 30, 2004 | | |
| China | February 6, 2005 | CD+DVD | |
| China | February 6, 2005 | CD | AVTCD-95793C: AVJCD-10220C; SCD-771 |
| South Korea | August 4, 2005 | | |
