= Moments (Ayumi Hamasaki song) =

Single by Ayumi Hamasaki

from the album My Story
- Released: March 31, 2004
- Recorded: 2004
- Genre: Pop rock
- Length: 23:23
- Label: Avex Trax
- Songwriters: Ayumi Hamasaki (lyrics); Tetsuya Yukumi (music)
- Producer: Max Matsuura

Ayumi Hamasaki singles chronology
"No Way to Say" (2003)	"Moments" (2004)	"Inspire" (2004)

Official Music Video
- "Moments" on YouTube

"Moments" is the thirty-second single released by Japanese recording artist Ayumi Hamasaki and was her first to be offered in both CD and CD+DVD versions. It was released on March 31, 2004, by Avex Trax. "Moments" was the first single in 2004 released by Hamasaki and was the lead single to her sixth studio album My Story (2004). "Moments" was used as the KOSÉ "VISÉE" CM song. This work marked her sixth appearance in the NHK Kohaku Uta Gassen held later the same year.

== Composition ==
The song "Moments" is written by Hamasaki and composed by Tetsuya Yukumi; while production is handled by Max Matsuura. "Moments" is Hamasaki's 32nd single, with a cute and feminine touch that shines through on the rock-oriented album My Story. The pop rock tune features a melody with a gentle and emotional development.

== Music video ==
The music video was first aired on MTV Japan on March 27, 2004, and the video was directed by Tetsuo Inoue.

It shows Hamasaki waking up at night. She opens a door where several kids are playing around in a flowery room, until the scene changes dramatically and everything is darker. Finally she ends up walking away while looking at the camera. Throughout this, there are cut-ins of her singing on a leather chair in a living room.

== Commercial performance ==
"Moments" debuted at number one on the Oricon Singles Chart, with 157,320 copies sold in its first week. The single stayed at the top of the chart for two consecutive weeks, selling 50,999 copies on its second charting week. The single slid to number three the following week, selling 27,562 copies. It stayed at number nine for the next two weeks, logging sales of 16,646 copies in its fourth charting week and 15,430 copies in its fifth week. On its sixth charting week "Moments" slid to number eleven with 10,659 copies sold, before disappearing from the top twenty entirely the following week. "Moments" ranked at number 20 on the year-end Oricon Singles Chart for 2004. The single charted in the top 100 for twenty-one weeks and sold a reported total of 302,923 physical copies. "Moments" received a platinum certification by the RIAJ for physical sales, a double platinum certification for ringtone sales in August 2006 and a gold certification in digital downloads in January 2014.

== Track listing ==
1. "Moments" – 5:31
2. "Moments" (acoustic piano version) - 5:33
3. "Moments" (Flying Humanoid mix) - 6:45
4. "Moments" (instrumental) – 5:31

== DVD track listing ==
1. "Moments" (PV)

== Live performances ==
- March 6, 2004 – Ayuready?
- March 26, 2004 – AX Music
- March 27, 2004 – CDTV
- April 2, 2004 – PopJam
- April 5, 2004 – Hey! Hey! Hey!
- April 9, 2004 – Music Station ("Moments ~acoustic version~")
- May 22, 2004 – MTV Super Dry Live
- December 1, 2004 – FNS Music Festival
- December 31, 2004 – Kouhaku Uta Gassen

== Charts ==
=== Weekly charts ===
Chart (2004)	Peak position
Japan Singles (Oricon)	1

=== Year-end charts ===
Chart (2004)	Position
Japan Singles (Oricon)	20

== Certifications ==
Region	Certification	Certified units/sales
Japan (RIAJ) Ringtone	2× Platinum	500,000^{*}
Japan (RIAJ) Digital single	Gold	100,000^{*}
Japan (RIAJ) Physical sales	Platinum	302,923
^{*} Sales figures based on certification alone.
