= Free & Easy (Ayumi Hamasaki song) =

Single by Ayumi Hamasaki

from the album Rainbow
- Released: April 24, 2002
- Genre: Pop rock; symphonic rock
- Length: 22:43
- Label: Avex Trax
- Songwriters: Ayumi Hamasaki (lyrics); CREA + DAI (music)
- Producer: Max Matsuura

Ayumi Hamasaki singles chronology
"Daybreak" (2002)	"Free & Easy" (2002)	"H" (2002)

Official Music Video
- "Free & Easy" on YouTube

"Free & Easy" is a song written by Ayumi Hamasaki and Dai Nagao for Hamasaki's album Rainbow. The song, the first single from Rainbow and Hamasaki's 26th total, was released in Japan on April 24, 2002.

The single was released with a photobook, Hamasaki Republic; the book, the song's booklet, and the song's music video depict Hamasaki as a "21st century Joan of Arc".

== Background and composition ==
"Free & Easy"
A 28-second sample of "Free & Easy", featuring Hamasaki's aggressive vocals.

With Rainbow, Hamasaki took a creative turn, incorporating English verses to the songs, and producing most songs on her own, under the pen-name CREA. "Free & Easy" was written by Hamasaki and produced by CREA along with DAI. In the director notes for Rainbow, Hamasaki explained that the song was inspired by an actual magazine photo shoot with Free & Easy magazine. The lyrics speak of self-empowerment and freedom. Hamasaki explained:

"In 'Free & Easy', I wrote what I am feeling at the moment. In other words, I want to be a person who lives by taking responsibility for my own freedom, and I want to be a person for whom these words are perfectly applicable."

The song opens with an eastern flute, and Hamasaki sings the verses with a light and airy vocal. As the song progresses, she starts singing with an aggressive tone over a horn accompanied melody. You can also recognize a certain similarity between the title "No Amen" from "The Messenger- Story of Joan of Arc" soundtrack in the beginning.

== Track listing ==
1. "Free & Easy" – 4:59
2. "Naturally" (Dolly remix)
3. "Still Alone" (Warp Brothers Extended Mix)
4. "Free & Easy" (Instrumental) – 4:59

== Music video ==
The music video features Hamasaki who plays Joan of Arc. First she is seen in prison and later a woman opens her prison door and takes her away. Then Hamasaki is seen tied up in a red room getting burned. Although no fire is apparent at the end, it was shown throughout the video during chorus. Later, at the end of the video, people holding her corpse are shown.

== Chart positions ==
Oricon Sales Chart (Japan)

Release	Chart	Peak position	First week sales	Sales total	Chart run
April 24, 2002	Oricon Daily Singles Chart	1			
April 24, 2002	Oricon Weekly Singles Chart	1	281,090	555,000	9
April 24, 2002	Oricon Yearly Singles Chart	15			

- RIAJ certification: 2× Platinum (shipped)
