= Carols (song) =

Single by Ayumi Hamasaki

from the album My Story
- Released: September 29, 2004
- Recorded: 2004
- Genre: J-pop
- Length: 23:41
- Label: Avex Trax
- Songwriters: Ayumi Hamasaki (lyrics); Tomoya Kinoshita (music)
- Producer: Max Matsuura

Ayumi Hamasaki singles chronology
"Inspire" (2004)	"Carols" (2004)	"Step You/Is This Love?" (2005)

Official Music Video
- "Carols" on YouTube

"Carols" is the thirty-fourth single released by Japanese recording artist Ayumi Hamasaki. It was released on September 29, 2004, by Avex Trax. It was released on the same day as her ARENA TOUR 2003~2004 A DVD. "Carols" was used as the Panasonic Digital Camera "LUMIX FX7" CM song. It was the last single to be released from her sixth studio album, My Story (2004).

== Background ==
By the end of her Arena Tour 2003–2004, Hamasaki had grown unsatisfied with her position in Avex: she felt that the company was treating her as a product instead of a person. Along with her dissatisfaction over her last two studio albums (which she thought had been rushed), this period of reassessment led her to begin work on My Story ahead of schedule. In contrast with her previous albums, My Story had no set theme, nor did Hamasaki attempt to write "something good" or even "something that would give people hope"; rather, she simply wrote freely and honestly. (Note: Original text from Oricon Style: "今回、正直にとか自由にっていうことはずっと頭の中にありましたね。だから、いいことを書 こうとか感動してもらおうとか、希望を持ってもらおうっていうようをことは一切意誠していなくて。単純に、ただ正直に書いていこうというだけでした。") As a result, the album contained mostly autobiographical lyrics about her emotions while reflecting on her career. She approached the composition of the music with the same freedom as the lyrics, with the album's notable rock overtones expressing her preference for that genre. She was so pleased with the result that she declared My Story the first album she felt satisfied with.

== Composition and release ==
"Carols" was written by Hamasaki herself, composed by Tomoya Kinoshita and produced by Avex chairman Max Matsuura. The song is musically a power ballad with lush, flowing strings blending into a harmonious melody line. The song was created with a warm, live sound in mind, featuring Shigekazu Aida (guitar) and strings by Gen Ittetsu Strings.

For the cover artwork, the sleeve was shot by Takashi Miezaki, art design was handled by Tomokazu Suzuki and was officially directed by Shinichi Hara. The cover sleeve depicts Hamasaki on a swing in front of a starry sky. "Carols" is to date Hamasaki's only single to be released on the DVD-Audio and SACD formats.

== Music video ==
The music video premiered a few days before the single's official release and was directed by Masashi Muto. The video, filmed in black and white, features Hamasaki singing in an empty opera house and on board a carousel.

== Commercial performance ==
"Carols" debuted at number one on the Oricon Singles Chart, with 177,778 copies sold in its first week. It dropped to number three the next week, selling 47,876 copies. On its third week the single remained at number three, selling 29,890 copies. The single stayed in the top ten one last week, ranking at number nine and selling 18,447 copies. "Carols" then slid to number eighteen with 12,498 copies sold, before dropping out of the top twenty entirely the following week. "Carols" ranked at number 20 on the year-end Oricon Singles Chart for 2004. The single charted in the top 100 for fifteen weeks and sold a reported total of 309,128 copies. Aside from its physical success, "Carols" also became Hamasaki's first song to sell a million ringtones.

== Track listing ==
1. Carols – 5:30
2. Carols "Criminal Tribal Mix" – 6:45
3. Carols "Hammond B-3 Whisper" – 5:47
4. Carols "Original Mix ~instrumental~" – 5:30

DVD

1. Carols (PV)

== Live performances ==
- September 24, 2004 – PopJam
- September 24, 2004 – Music Station
- September 26, 2004 – CDTV
- September 30, 2004 – AX Music
- October 8, 2004 – Music Station
- October 18, 2004 – Hey! Hey! Hey!
- December 15, 2004 – Best Artist
- December 24, 2004 – Music Station

== Charts ==
=== Weekly charts ===
Chart (2004)	Peak position
Japan Singles Chart (Oricon)	1

=== Year-end charts ===
Chart (2004)	Peak position
Japan Singles Chart (Oricon)	19

== Certifications ==
Region	Certification	Certified units/sales
Japan (RIAJ) Physical	Platinum	309,128
Japan (RIAJ) Chaku-uta	Million	1,000,000^{*}
^{*} Sales figures based on certification alone.
