= Zutto.../Last Minute/Walk =

2014 single by Ayumi Hamasaki

Single by Ayumi Hamasaki

from the album A One
- Released: December 24, 2014
- Recorded: November 2014
- Genre: J-pop; Pop rock
- Length: 28:27
- Label: Avex Trax
- Songwriters: Ayumi Hamasaki; Kunio Tago; Tetsuya Yukumi; Tetsuya Komuro
- Producer: Max Matsuura

Ayumi Hamasaki singles chronology
"Terminal" (2014)	"Zutto.../Last Minute/Walk" (2014)	"Step by Step" (2015)

Official Music Video
- "Zutto..." on YouTube

Official Music Video
- "Last Minute" on YouTube

"Zutto.../Last Minute/Walk" is the 53rd single of Japanese singer Ayumi Hamasaki. It was released on December 24, 2014, by Avex Trax.

== Background ==
In November 2014, Hamasaki announced through her official Facebook page that she had started recording new material for a "winter trilogy single", comprising three ballads composed by Kunio Tago, Tetsuya Yukumi and Tetsuya Komuro. This was the first time of Hamasaki's career that she shared in social media all the process of making the single, mentioning also how she had "writer's block" problems while creating the lyrics for the songs. "Zutto...", which translates to "Always...", is one of the few songs of Hamasaki that has a Japanese title, although written in romaji.

The single was released digitally on December 17, and physically on December 24, 2014. It in five different formats: CD, Limited Edition CD single (TeamAyu edition), and three music card singles.

== Music videos ==
Initially "Zutto..." was the only song of the single for which a music video was recorded. The music video, inspired by feelings of "loneliness", and including scenes recorded in a studio with −10°C (14°F), was published on YouTube on December 19, 2014.

After the release of the single, in February 2015 Hamasaki announced that she had decided to record a music video for "Last Minute", as it had become one of her favorite songs. The video was later included in the DVD of A One.

== Chart performance ==
"Zutto.../Last Minute/Walk" debuted at number 5 on the Oricon charts, selling 28,446 copies on its first week. It ended up selling 35,550 copies, charting for 7 weeks. The single made Hamasaki the first solo artist in Japan's history —and third artist in general, after groups Morning Musume and SMAP— to have 50 singles within the Top 10 since the establishment of the charts in 1968.

== Track listing ==
=== Regular edition ===
1. Zutto... (Original Mix)
2. Last Minute (Original Mix)
3. Walk (Original Mix)
4. Zutto... (Original Mix -Instrumental-)
5. Last Minute (Original Mix -Instrumental-)
6. Walk (Original Mix -Instrumental-)

=== TeamAyu version ===
1. Zutto... (Original Mix)
2. Last Minute (Original Mix)
3. Walk (Original Mix)
4. Winter Ballad Medley ("Days", "Carols", "No Way to Say", "Jewel", "You Were...", "Momentum" and "Powder Snow")
5. Zutto... (Original Mix -Instrumental-)
6. Last Minute (Original Mix -Instrumental-)
7. Walk (Original Mix -Instrumental-)

=== Music card ===
1. Zutto... (Original Mix)
2. Last Minute (Original Mix)
3. Walk (Original Mix)
