= Memorial Address =

EP by Ayumi Hamasaki
- Released: December 17, 2003
- Genre: Dance; electronic; R&B; rock; alternative metal
- Length: 38:45
- Label: Avex Trax
- Producer: Max Matsuura

Ayumi Hamasaki chronology
A Ballads (2003)	Memorial Address (2003)	My Story (2004)

Singles from Memorial Address
- 1. "&" Released: July 9, 2003; 2. "Forgiveness" Released: August 20, 2003; 3. "No Way to Say" Released: November 6, 2003

Memorial Address is the debut mini-album by Japanese singer Ayumi Hamasaki. Avex Trax released the album on December 17, 2003, in both physical and digital formats; it was her first album to be released in CD+DVD format in addition to the regular CD-only format, due to her increased interest in music video direction. The mini-album contains eight songs and features a number of collaborators, including Tetsuya Yukumi, Bounceback, CMJK, and Dai Nagao, among others, with Hamasaki serving as co-composer and songwriter. Memorial Address's musical influences include dance music, electronic, R&B, rock, and alternative metal.

Music critics praised Memorial Address, citing the progression in Hamasaki's sound and the overall release as a high point in her career. The mini-album was commercially successful, reaching number one on Japan's Oricon Albums Chart with more than half a million copies sold in its opening week. It was certified million by the Recording Industry Association of Japan (RIAJ) for exceeding one million unit shipments and remains the country's best-selling mini-album by a Japanese female singer. Memorial Address produced three singles: "&", "Forgiveness", and "No Way to Say", all of which were successful in Japan. To promote the mini-album, she embarked on a Japanese Arena Tour in 2003–04.

== Background and composition ==
Memorial Address is Hamasaki's first mini-album, released ten months after her ballad-themed compilation album A Ballads. Max Matsuura, a long-time collaborator, produced the album, which was mixed by Koji Morimoto, Satoshi Kumasaka, and Yasuo Matsumoto, and mastered by Shigeo Miyamoto. The mini-album features seven songs, including a bonus title track, and was produced by a number of collaborators, including Tetsuya Yukumi, Bounceback, CMJK, and Dai Nagao, among others, with Hamasaki serving as co-composer and songwriter on most tracks. Yukumi of Lover Sound Track composed "Memorial Address," which was originally a melody taken from the band's track "Kumo."

Memorial Address's musical influences include dance music, electronic, R&B, rock, and alternative metal. According to Neil Z. Yeung of AllMusic, the mini-album "ushered in a heavier rock grit to her sound" that was later inspired on her subsequent albums. Throughout the album, he noted influences of pop songs with electronic dance influences ("Angel Song", "Greatful Days"), rock and alternative metal ("Because of You"), and tracks compared to American R&B group Destiny's Child ("Ourselves"). Furthermore, Japanese magazine CDJournal described the second half as featuring more emotional tracks, with "No Way to Say" being "mellow" and the title track having a rock sound with "heartfelt" lyrics.

== Release and promotion ==
On December 17, 2003, Avex Trax released Memorial Address. The CD version contained eight tracks in total, whereas the DVD version contained the album and music videos for all songs except "Memorial Address," as well as a limited digest film of her A Museum: 30th Collection Live, which was packaged in a large jewel case. Avex Trax then released Memorial Address in Asia, including China, Hong Kong, Indonesia, and Taiwan, as well as digital and streaming services. To promote the mini-album, she embarked on a Japanese Arena Tour in 2003–04, culminating in a live release on September 29, 2004.

Furthermore, three singles were issued. Avex Trax released "&" as the lead single on July 9, 2003, and is a triple A-side that includes the songs "Ourselves," "Greatful Days," and "Hanabi: Episode II". All formats of the single both include additional instrumental tracks as well as the A-Nation 2003 theme. It was a commercial success in Japan, reaching number one on the Oricon Singles Chart and earning double platinum certification by the Recording Industry Association of Japan (RIAJ) for selling over 500,000 units. On August 20, 2003, "Forgiveness" was released, and all formats included the instrumental track as well as remixes of "Ourselves" and "Hanabi: Episode II". It was a commercial success in Japan, reaching number one on the Oricon Singles Chart for 12 weeks and being certified platinum by the RIAJ for sales of over 250,000 units. It was used as the drama Kōgen e Irasshai's theme song.

On November 6, 2003, "No Way to Say" was released as the mini-album's final single, with physical and digital formats containing various mixes of the single, as well as acoustic versions of her songs "Seasons", "Dearest", and "Voyage". It was a commercial success in Japan, peaking at number one on the Oricon Singles Chart and earning two certifications: platinum for physical shipments and gold for more than 100,000 digital downloads. Furthermore, the album's title track reached number 82 on the RIAJ Digital Track Chart and was certified gold for digital downloads.

== Reception ==
Professional ratings
Review scores
Source	Rating
AllMusic	4/5 stars
CDJournal	(positive)

Music critics gave Memorial Address positive reviews. Neil Z. Yeung of AllMusic gave the mini-album four stars, describing it as an "absolute highlight in Ayumi Hamasaki's catalogue." He selected "Because of You" and "Ourselves" as standout tracks from the mini-album, concluding, "Though not a totally hidden gem, Memorial Address should be sought out when enjoying the first half of her first decade as Japan's queen of pop." The Japanese magazine CDJournal praised Hamasaki's vocals and songwriting on some tracks, particularly "No Way to Say" and "Memorial Address," calling them "superb" and wondering if the latter track could represent the singer's future sound.

Memorial Address achieved commercial success in Japan. The album debuted at number one on the Oricon Albums Chart, selling 524,028 copies in its first week, becoming her eighth studio album to reach that position. It dropped to number two the next week, selling 306,521 copies, being knocked off the top spot my Mai Kuraki's Wish You the Best. The album stayed in the top ten for five weeks and in the top 300 chart for 48 weeks. It reached fifth place on the Oricon Year-end Chart in 2004, selling over 1.059 million copies and becoming the best-selling mini-album of the year. The Recording Industry Association of Japan (RIAJ) certified the album million for sales exceeding one million units. According to Oricon, Memorial Address sold 1,062,288 copies in Japan and remains the best-selling mini-album by a female Japanese singer in the country.

== Track listing ==
All lyrics are written by Ayumi Hamasaki.

CD track list
No.	Title	Music	Arranger(s)	Length
1.	"Angel's Song"	Tetsuya Yukumi	Hal	4:56
2.	"Greatful Days"	Bounceback	Hal	4:37
3.	"Because of You"	Bounceback	Hal	5:20
4.	"Ourselves"	Bounceback	CMJK	4:31
5.	"Hanabi: Episode II" (lit. Fireworks: Episode II)	Ayumi Hamasaki; D.A.I; (Note: Hamasaki is credited on liner notes under the pseudonym Crea)	tasuku	4:53
6.	"No Way to Say"	Bounceback	Hal	4:43
7.	"Forgiveness"	Hamasaki; D.A.I	CMJK	5:49
8.	"Memorial Address" (take 2 version)	Tetsuya Yukumi	tasuku	3:56

DVD track list
No.	Title	Length
1.	"Angel's Song" (Video Clip)
2.	"Greatful Days" (Video Clip)
3.	"Because of You" (Video Clip)
4.	"Ourselves" (Video Clip)
5.	"Hanabi: Episode II" (Video Clip)
6.	"No Way to Say" (Video Clip)
7.	"Forgiveness" (Video Clip)
8.	"Special Digest from A Museum: 30th Collection Live"

== Charts ==
=== Weekly charts ===
Chart (2003–2004)	Peak position
Japanese Albums (Oricon)	1

=== Monthly charts ===
Chart (2003)	Peak position
Japanese Albums (Oricon)	2

=== Year-end charts ===
Chart (2004)	Peak position
Japanese Albums (Oricon)	5

=== Decade-end charts ===
Chart (2000–2009)	Position
Japanese Albums (Oricon)	87

=== All-time chart ===
Chart	Position
Japanese Albums (Oricon)	259

== Certification and sales ==
Region	Certification	Certified units/sales
Japan (RIAJ)	Million	1,062,288

== Release history ==
Region	Date	Format(s)	Label	Ref.
Japan	December 19, 2003	CD; DVD	Avex Trax	
Hong Kong	December 19, 2003	CD; DVD	Avex Trax	
Taiwan	December 19, 2003	CD; DVD	Avex Trax	
Indonesia	December 19, 2003	Cassette	Avex Trax	
China	2004–2005	CD; DVD	Avex Trax	
Various	N/A	Digital download; streaming	Avex Trax	
