= Voyage (Ayumi Hamasaki song) =

Single by Ayumi Hamasaki

from the album Rainbow
- Released: September 26, 2002
- Recorded: 2002
- Genre: J-pop
- Length: 5:08
- Label: Avex Trax
- Songwriters: Ayumi Hamasaki (lyrics); CREA + DAI (music)
- Producer: Max Matsuura

Ayumi Hamasaki singles chronology
| "H" (2002) | "Voyage" (2002) | "&" (2003) |

Official Music Video
- "Voyage" on YouTube

"Voyage" is the 28th single released by Japanese singer Ayumi Hamasaki, serving as the third and final single for her fifth studio album, Rainbow (2002). It was released by Avex Trax in Japan and Hong Kong on September 26, 2002. The track was written by the singer herself, while the composition was done by the singer herself under the pseudonym Crea with the assistance of Dai Nagao. Production was handled by long-time collaborator Max Matsuura. Musically, the song is a power ballad that lyrically describes the themes of fate, destiny, and finding one's true love.

Upon its release, "Voyage" received positive reviews from music critics, praising its production quality and describing it as "graceful." Commercially, the single experienced success in Japan, spending three consecutive weeks at number one on both the Oricon Singles Chart and Tokyo Broadcasting System's (TBS) Count Down TV singles chart. It went on to ship over 750,000 copies, and was certified triple platinum by the Recording Industry Association of Japan (RIAJ). It became one of the most successful songs in Japan of 2002, and won the 44th Japan Record Awards' grand prix by the end of the year.

"Voyage" was used as the theme song of the Japanese film Tsuki ni Shizumu, which was created in lieu of a music video for the single. In order to promote the single, it appeared on several remix and greatest hits albums and live concert tours conducted by Hamasaki. It was also used as the opening theme of the dorama My Little Chef, which starred Hiroshi Abe and Aya Ueto.

== Background and release ==
"Voyage"
"Voyage" is a power ballad that speaks about fate, destiny, and finding one's soulmate.

"Voyage" was written by Hamasaki herself, while production was handled by long-time collaborator Max Matsuura. The song was composed by Hamasaki using the pseudonym Crea with the assistance of Do As Infinity composer Dai Nagao under the alias D･A･I. It was arranged by Ken Shima. It was also mixed by Yasuo Matsumoto, and mastered by Shigeo Miyamoto. Musically, "Voyage" is a power ballad which features Hamasaki singing "positive" lyrics with a "strong" voice, accompanied by strings and piano. The person responsible for focusing the track precisely on the musical image that Hamasaki desired was the arranger, Ken Shima, who was responsible for giving the song an elaborate string line and a gospel-style chorus provided by African-American singers. About the song, Hamasaki said;

D･A･I and I had the melody, and I had the lyrics and vocals, but there was just something missing. That's when Ken Shima's arrangement came into the picture. When I heard the finished product, I realized the song had reached amazing heights that I could not have achieved.

"Voyage" served as the third and final single from the album Rainbow. It was released by Avex Trax in Japan and Hong Kong on September 26, 2002. Its CD edition featured a total of four tracks, two of which were remixes of the songs "Hanabi" and "Independent" and its instrumental. The cover art is photographed by Mitsuo Yamamoto and depicts Hamasaki wearing a coral kimono in the woods with a white horse in the back.

== Reception ==
A member of CD Journal was positive towards the original version of the single, but also complimented the remixes featured on its maxi release. The review said that the forest and white horse, as well as the vivid artwork, perfectly match the image of the song. The review also said that the "Independent" remix has a strong beat and is well-made. For their review of Rainbow the magazine called the song "Voyage" "high quality" and praised the arrangement. The critical success of "Voyage" won the song several awards such as the grand prix at both the 44th Japan Record Awards and the 35th Japan Cable Awards. The former win made Hamasaki the first person in four years since Namie Amuro to win the Japan Record Awards' grand prix for two consecutive years.

Commercially, "Voyage" was a success in Japan. The single debuted at number one on the weekly charts with 319,020 copies sold in its first week and remained at the top position for three consecutive weeks. To date, "Voyage" is Hamasaki's only single which has remained in the top position of the Oricon Singles Chart for least three weeks other than "H" and "A"; however, "Voyage" is Hamasaki's only single to stay at number one for three consecutive weeks ("A" and "H" spent three non-consecutive weeks at number one). The single charted in the top ten for six weeks and spent a total 21 weeks on the chart. It also debuted at number one on Tokyo Broadcasting System's (TBS) Count Down TV chart during the chart week of October 5, 2002, her fourteenth single to do so.

"Voyage" managed to sell a total of 628,730 copies by the end of 2002, becoming the ninth-best-selling single of the year in Japan according to Oricon. Likewise, it charted at number 7 on TBS' Annual Chart. The single was certified triple platinum by the Recording Industry Association of Japan (RIAJ) for shipments over 750,000 copies in December 2003, becoming her final single to achieve this. "Voyage was also certified gold for selling over 100,000 legal downloads in July 2014. "Voyage" is Hamasaki's eleventh highest-selling song according to Oricon Style's database.

== Music video and promotion ==
The official video, depicting Hamasaki as Kagari.

A regular music video for "Voyage" does not exist; however, Tsuki ni Shizumu, a short film starring Hamasaki was created for which "Voyage" was used as the theme song. The short film inspired by the song, directed by Isao Yukisada, was released on October 26, 2002.

The video starts with a young woman named Minamo (played by Hamasaki) is at a mental institution and has recurring detailed visions of a traumatizing past life. Her visions include a lake with a large image of the moon shining down over it. She is crying tears of blood as she slowly sinks into the lake. She hears someone calling her name "Kagari" which was her name in her past life. At the mental hospital she eventually stumbles across a visitor which causes her to go wild and reach out to him as if she had already known him. The doctor believes that Minamo died a traumatizing death in her previous life and therefore she needs to become reunited with her soul mate in this life.

In her past life, there is a deranged madwoman who insists that Kagari (Minamo) must be sacrificed to the moon because a special full moon was approaching which only showed up once every hundred years. When the madwoman shows up with her goons to kill Kagari and sacrifice her to the moon, Kagari's soul mate Sonshin (played by Yūsuke Iseya) shows up to try and defend her. Kagari and Sonshin get away from the fiends and spend one final loving moment together. Soon after, the psychopathic woman and her group of minions track Kagari down and brutally kill Sonshin for trying to defend Kagari. Eventually the demented woman ends up getting Kagari and sacrificing her to the moon once and for all. This leads to a gorgeous scene in which Kagari sinks into the shining light of the moon on a lake. Back in the present time, Minamo finds the lake where she was traumatically sacrificed to the moon in her past life. She meets up with the visitor from the hospital who was also the man in her visions: Sonshin, or Shōgo (in present). They briefly speak and realize that they were in fact each other's soul mates and become reunited for good. The video ends with Minamo and Shōgo hugging.

"Voyage" was additionally used as the opening theme of the TBS dorama My Little Chef, starring Hiroshi Abe and Aya Ueto, as well as the ending theme for Hamasaki's late night talk show Ayuready? on Fuji TV. That same year, Hamasaki made her fourth appearance on Kouhaku Uta Gassen by singing "Voyage" at the 53rd NHK Kōhaku Uta Gassen as a member of the Red team.

== Track listing ==
1. "Voyage" – 5:08
2. "HANABI" (Electrical Bossa Mix) - 5:06
3. "independent" (Sugiurumn Mix) - 5:46
4. "Voyage" (Instrumental) – 5:08

== Charts ==
=== Weekly charts ===
| Chart (2002) | Peak position |
|---|---|
| Japan Singles (Oricon) | 1 |
| Japan Count Down TV Chart (TBS) | 1 |

=== Monthly charts ===
| Chart (2002) | Peak position |
|---|---|
| Japan Singles (Oricon) | 1 |

=== Year-end charts ===
| Chart (2002) | Peak position |
|---|---|
| Japan Singles (Oricon) | 9 |
| Japan Count Down TV Chart (TBS) | 7 |
| Taiwan (Yearly Singles Top 100) | 44 |

== Certifications and sales ==
| Region | Certification | Certified units/sales |
|---|---|---|
| Japan (RIAJ) | 3× Platinum | 679,463 |
| Japan (RIAJ) Digital single | Platinum | 250,000^{*} |
Streaming
| Japan (RIAJ) | Gold | 50,000,000^{†} |
^{*} Sales figures based on certification alone.^{†} Streaming-only figures based on certification alone.

| Preceded by "Dearest" (Ayumi Hamasaki) | Japan Record Award Grand Prix; 2002 | Succeeded by "No Way to Say" (Ayumi Hamasaki) |
