= Inspire (song) =

Single by Ayumi Hamasaki

from the album My Story
- B-side: "Game"
- Released: July 28, 2004
- Recorded: 2004
- Genre: J-pop, hip-hop
- Length: 17:35
- Label: Avex Trax
- Songwriter(s): Ayumi Hamasaki (lyrics); Tetsuya Yukumi (music); BOUNCEBACK (music)
- Producer(s): Max Matsuura

Ayumi Hamasaki singles chronology
"Moments" (2004)	"Inspire" (2004)	"Carols" (2004)

Official Music Video
- "Inspire" on YouTube

Official Music Video
- "Game" on YouTube

Inspire is the thirty-third single released by Japanese recording artist Ayumi Hamasaki. It was released on July 28, 2004, by Avex Trax. "Inspire" was used as the image song for a Fuji TV special about the Guggenheim Museum in New York as well as a tie-in for Avex auditions 2004. The B-side "Game" was used as the Panasonic 700MD CM song. This was her first release in about 4 months since her previous single, "Moments." It was released in two formats; "CD only" and "CD+DVD". The single was her last to be released in CCCD format. Both songs were featured on the album My Story, which came out in December that same year.

== Composition ==
The lyrics to "Inspire" and "Game" were written by Hamasaki and the songs were composed by Tetsuya Yukumi and BOUNCEBACK respectively; while both songs were produced by Max Matsuura. "Inspire" is a heavy digital beat number with rock influences, and with lyrics that have a strong message, showcasing her more aggressive side. The song "Game" starts with a nostalgic intro like a reminiscence, and then changes gears to a hard rock number.

== Music video ==
The music video for "Inspire" was directed by Inoue Tatsuo and was filmed in Los Angeles, California. The synopsis is that Hamasaki is walking down the city and sees a promotional poster of "Inspire" with arid earth as the promotional image. Then it shows Hamasaki going to a tropical island by raft. There she sings and dances in the ocean water with her dancers, and also does a versioned tribal dance.

The music video for "Game" was directed by Sunaga Hideaki. It shows Hamasaki singing in a hall full of screens on the walls, on a platform with her band and a mysterious being in black leather.

== Chart performance ==
"Inspire" debuted at number one on the Oricon Singles Chart, with 181,325 copies sold in its first week. The single slid to number three the following week, logging sales of 59,179 units. It descended to number four on its third week, shipping 37,357 units, before dropping out of the top ten on its fourth week. The single charted in the top 100 for fifteen weeks, selling a reported total of 329,145 copies, making it Hamasaki's highest selling single of 2004. It also was certified Platinum by the Recording Industry Association of Japan. "Inspire" ranked at number 16 on the year-end Oricon Singles Chart for 2004. "Inspire" was also successful in digital markets, being certified Triple Platinum for Chaku-uta downloads of 750,000 in August 2006.

== Track listing ==
1. "Inspire" – 4:33
2. "Game" – 4:16
3. "Inspire" (instrumental) – 4:33
4. "Game" (instrumental) – 4:16

DVD

1. "Inspire" (PV)
2. "Game" (PV)

== Live performances ==
- July 22, 2004 – AX Music – "INSPIRE"
- July 23, 2004 – PopJam – "GAME"
- July 23, 2004 – Music Station – "INSPIRE" and "GAME"
- July 24, 2004 – CDTV – "INSPIRE"
- July 27, 2004 – CDTV Special – "GAME"
- August 2, 2004 – Hey! Hey! Hey! – "INSPIRE"
- August 11, 2004 – Sokuhou Uta no Daijiten – "INSPIRE"
- December 31, 2004 – CDTV Special 2004-2005 – "INSPIRE" and "GAME"
- December 31, 2013 – Kouhaku Uta Gassen

== Charts ==
=== Weekly charts ===
Chart (2004)	Peak position
Japan Singles Chart (Oricon)	1

=== Year-end charts ===
Chart (2004)	Peak position
Japan Singles Chart (Oricon)	16

== Certifications ==
Region	Certification	Certified units/sales
Japan (RIAJ) Physical	Platinum	329,145
Japan (RIAJ) Chaku-uta	3× Platinum	750,000^{*}
^{*} Sales figures based on certification alone.
