= Ayumi Hamasaki Countdown Live 2002–2003 A =

Video by Ayumi Hamasaki
- Released: 2003
- Recorded: 2002–2003
- Genre: J-pop

Ayumi Hamasaki chronology
Ayumi Hamasaki Stadium Tour 2002 A (2003)	Ayumi Hamasaki Countdown Live 2002–2003 A (2003)	Ayumi Hamasaki Complete Live Box A (2003)

Ayumi Hamasaki's Ayumi Hamasaki Countdown Live 2002–2003 A, a new year's eve show, was released in a Complete Live Box.

== Performed songs track listing ==
1. Taskinillusion
2. Real Me
3. Evolution
4. Unite!
5. Heartplace
6. Free & Easy
7. Hanabi

=== Dance Show Time ===
1. Boys & Girls
2. TRF medley
3. Audience: Count Down
4. We Wish
5. Everywhere Nowhere
6. Trauma
7. Voyage

=== Encore ===
1. Independent
2. +
3. July 1st
