= A One =

Studio album by Ayumi Hamasaki
- Released: April 8, 2015
- Recorded: 2014–2015
- Studio: Record Plant, Los Angeles; Prime Sound Studio Form, Avex, Avex Azabu, Victor, Bunkamura, LAB Recorders, Sony Music, Tokyo
- Genre: J-pop; rock
- Length: 56:27
- Label: Avex Trax
- Producer: Max Matsuura

Ayumi Hamasaki chronology
Love Classics (2015)	A One (2015)	Sixxxxxx (2015)

Singles from A One
- 1. "Movin' On Without You" Released: December 9, 2014; 2. "Zutto.../Last Minute/Walk" Released: December 24, 2014

Professional ratings
Review scores
Source	Rating
AllMusic	3/5 stars

A One is the sixteenth full-length studio album recorded by Japanese singer Ayumi Hamasaki. It was released on April 8, 2015 (exactly 17 years after her debut) by Avex Trax. It reached #4 on the Oricon charts.

== Background and promotion ==
On December 24, 2014, Hamasaki released a triple A-side single "Zutto.../Last Minute/Walk". The single consisted of a "winter ballad trilogy" that included three songs composed by Kunio Tago, Tetsuya Yukumi, Tetsuya Komuro. In February 2015, Hamasaki announced through her official website that she was going to release a new album on April 8, 2015, which marked the 17th anniversary since the release of her debut single, "Poker Face".

In March 2015, Hamasaki went to Singapore, where she sang her new song "The Gift" in collaboration with singer-songwriter JJ Lin.

Upon release, it entered the Oricon album chart at number 4 for the week of April 20.

== Track listing ==
All lyrics are written by Ayumi Hamasaki; except for track 12 written by Hikaru Utada

CD
No.	Title	Music	Arranger(s)/Producer	Length
1.	"A Bell"	Yuta Nakano	Nakano	1:10
2.	"Warning"	Kazuhiro Hara	Tasuku	4:06
3.	"No Future"	Tetsuya Komuro	Nakano	5:53
4.	"Anything for You"	Komuro	Nakano	7:01
5.	"Last Minute"	Tetsuya Yukumi	Nakano	4:23
6.	"Zutto..."	Kunio Tago	Nakano	4:49
7.	"Out of Control"	Yukumi	Tasuku	4:47
8.	"Story"	Yukumi	Nakano	5:17
9.	"The Gift" (featuring JJ Lin)	JJ Lin	Shingo Kobayashi	3:53
10.	"The Show Must Go On"	Komuro	Tasuku	5:55
11.	"Walk"	Komuro	Nakano	5:02
12.	"Movin' on Without You" (surprise bonus track)	Hikaru Utada	Yohanne Simon (RedOne Production)	4:11
13.	"Tell All" (2015 Mix) (TeamAyu ver. Bonus track)	Nakano	Nakano

DVD/Blu-ray
No.	Title	Director(s)	Length
1.	"Zutto..." (Video Clip)	Masashi Muto
2.	"Last Minute" (Video Clip)	Muto
3.	"The Gift" (Video Clip)	Hideaki Sunaga
4.	"Warning" (Video Clip)	A Crew
5.	"Zutto..." (Making Clip)	Keisuke Onodera
6.	"Last Minute" (Making Clip)	Onodera
7.	"The Gift" (Making Clip)	Onodera
8.	"Warning" (Making Clip)	Onodera

== Personnel ==
Credits for A One adapted from liner notes.

- Mastered by - Shigeo Minamoto
- Recorded by Naoki Yamada, Yuichi Nagayama, Hiroshi Sato, Hideaki Jinbu
- Second Engineers: Yujiro Yonetsu, Yutaro Wada, Atsushi Ohta, Junichi Shinohara, Motohiro Noguchi
- Composer Management - Tomonori Takeda, Tadayoshi Matsuzaka, Yuki Iwabuchi, Kohji Satoh
- Engineer Management - Rieko Furukawa
- Studio Coordination in LA - Mai Takamizawa
- Studio Setup Assistant - Noriko Yajima
- Players and Studio Coordination - Yoji Sugiyama
- Track 9 Support - Alvin Goh, Shinji Miyazaki (Avex Taiwan Inc.), Tomoko Kabeya (Avex Group Holdings Inc.)
- Track 12 Support - Hidenobu Okita, Nozomu Kaji (Universal Music)
- Director - Hidetomo "Kome" Yoneda
- A&R - Jiro Nakagiri
- General Supervisor - Shintaro Higuchi, Hiroaki Ito
- Executive Supervisor - Shinji Hayashi, Shigekazu Takeuchi, Ryuhei Chiba
- Photographer - Akinori Ito
- Art Direction & Design - Takuma Noriage

== Charts ==
Chart	Peak position	Debut sales	Total sales
Oricon Daily Chart	3	20,025	70,000 (17 weeks)
Oricon Weekly Chart	4	34,692	70,000 (17 weeks)
Oricon Yearly Chart	90	52,816	70,000 (17 weeks)
