= No Way to Say =

Single by Ayumi Hamasaki

from the album Memorial Address
- Released: November 6, 2003
- Recorded: 2003
- Genre: J-pop; soft rock
- Length: 34:51
- Label: Avex Trax
- Songwriter: Ayumi Hamasaki
- Producers: Max Matsuura; Bounceback

Ayumi Hamasaki singles chronology
"Forgiveness" (2003)	"No Way to Say" (2003)	"Moments" (2004)

Official Music Video
- "No Way To Say" on YouTube

"No Way to Say" is the thirty-first single released by Ayumi Hamasaki and her eighteenth number-one single. It came out November 6, 2003. The video won the award for "Best Pop Video" at the 2004 MTV Video Music Awards Japan, and the single won the Japan Record Award at the 2003 Japan Record Awards. The song is featured on the mini-album Memorial Address.

== Accolades ==
Awards for "No Way to Say"
Year	Organization	Award	Result	Ref.
2003	Japan Record Awards	Grand Prix	Won	
2003	Japan Record Awards	Exellence Award	Won	
2004	MTV Video Music Awards Japan	Best Pop Video	Won	

== Track listing ==
1. "No Way to Say" – 4:46
2. "No Way to Say" (acoustic version)
3. "Seasons" (acoustic version)
4. "Dearest" (acoustic orchestra version)
5. "Voyage" (acoustic orchestra version)
6. "No Way to Say" (Vandalize/Realize mix)
7. "No Way to Say" (instrumental) – 4:46

== Live performances ==
- October 3, 2003 – Music Station
- November 1, 2003 – Ayu Ready?
- November 6, 2003 – AX Music
- November 7, 2003 – Music Station
- November 15, 2003 – CDTV
- November 15, 2003 – PopJam
- November 19, 2003 – Sokuhou Uta no Daijiten
- November 28, 2003 – Best Hit Song Festival
- November 29, 2003 – Ayu Ready?
- December 1, 2003 – Hey! Hey! Hey!
- December 3, 2003 – FNS Music Festival
- December 17, 2003 – Best Artist
- December 20, 2003 – Ayu Ready?
- December 22, 2003 – Hey! Hey! Hey! Christmas Special – "No Way to Say: Acoustic Version"
- December 23, 2003 – Happy X-mas SHOW!
- December 26, 2003 – Music Station Super Live
- December 31, 2003 – Kouhaku Uta Gassen
- December 31, 2003 – Japan Record Awards (2 performances)
- December 31, 2003 – CDTV Special 2003-2004
- March 14, 2004 – Japan Gold Disc Awards
- December 23, 2007 – HAPPY X-mas SHOW!

== Charts ==
=== Weekly charts ===
Chart (2003)	Peak position
Japan Singles (Oricon)	1

=== Year-end charts ===
Chart (2003)	Position
Japan Singles (Oricon)	32

Chart (2004)	Position
Japan Singles (Oricon)	71

== Sales and certifications ==
Region	Certification	Certified units/sales
Japan (RIAJ) Physical single	Platinum	425,000
Japan (RIAJ) Digital download	Gold	100,000^{*}
^{*} Sales figures based on certification alone.

Preceded by "Voyage" (Ayumi Hamasaki)	Japan Record Award Grand Prix; 2003	Succeeded by "Sign" (Mr. Children)
