= Ayumi Hamasaki Arena Tour 2003–2004 A =

Video by Ayumi Hamasaki
- Released: September 2004
- Recorded: 2003–2004
- Genre: J-pop

Ayumi Hamasaki chronology
| Ayumi Hamasaki A Museum: 30th Single Collection Live (2003) | Ayumi Hamasaki Arena Tour 2003–2004 A (2004) | Ayumi Hamasaki Countdown Live 2004-2005 A (2005) |

Ayumi Hamasaki Arena Tour 2003–2004 A was released on September 29, 2004.

== Track listing ==
=== Opening ===
1. Ourselves
2. Real Me
3. Angel's Song
4. Fly High
5. Teddy Bear
6. Memorial Address
7. Because of You
8. Surreal, Evolution, Surreal
9. No Way to Say
10. Grateful Days
11. Boys & Girls
12. Unite!

=== Encore ===
1. Moments
2. Trauma
3. Independent
4. Flower Garden
5. Who...
