= Ayumi Hamasaki discography =

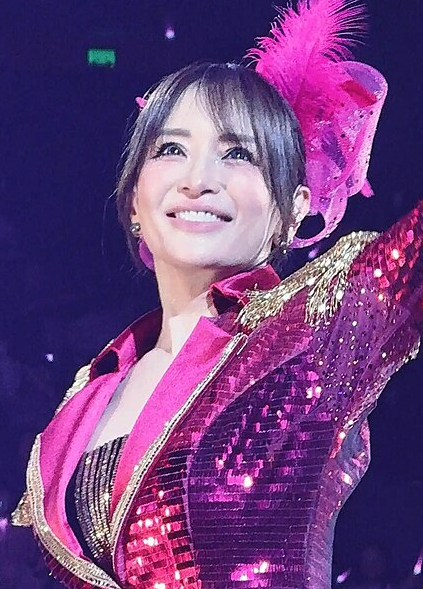
- Hamasaki in Ningbo in 2024
- Studio albums: 18
- Extended plays: 7
- Live albums: 3
- Compilation albums: 9
- Remix albums: 26
- Singles: 58

The Japanese singer-songwriter Ayumi Hamasaki has released eighteen studio albums, seven extended plays, nine compilation albums, twenty-six remix albums, three live albums, and fifty-eight singles. She initially debuted under Nippon Columbia as "Ayumi", releasing the extended play Nothing from Nothing (1995). Three years later, Hamasaki made a second debut under Avex Trax with the single "Poker Face" (1998). The artist's first album A Song for ×× (1999) reached number one on Oricon's albums chart, selling over 1.4 million copies. Her second studio album, Loveppears (1999), also topped the Oricon charts and sold nearly 3 million copies. To date, Hamasaki currently holds the record for the most albums to place in the top ten by a female artist in Japan.

Hamasaki continued to release music at a prolific rate throughout her career; she has the most number-one hits by a female artist (38); the most consecutive number-one hits by a solo artist (25), and the most million-sellers. From 1999 to 2010, Hamasaki had at least two singles each year topping the charts. Hamasaki is also the first female recording artist to have ten studio albums since debut to top the Oricon, and the first artist to have a number one album for 13 consecutive years since her debut. In total, Hamasaki has sold over 50.708 million units in Japan.

Hamasaki also has an extensive remix discography, having released twenty-six remix albums since the 1999 album Ayu-mi-x. Several remix albums were released as a series, exploring genres such as eurobeat, trance, acoustic, and classical.

== Albums ==
=== Studio albums ===
List of albums, with selected chart positions
Title	Album details	Peak positions						Sales (Note: Sales provided by Oricon database and are rounded to the nearest thousand copies.)	Certifications
Title	Album details	JPN	KOR (Note: The Gaon Album Chart was established in 2010. The Gaon Chart was rebranded as the Circle Chart in 2022. Week references for Gaon: Love Songs, Party Queen, Love Again, Colours.)	KOR Intl. (Note: The International Album Chart was dissolved in 2022 after the Gaon Chart was rebranded as the Circle Chart. Week references for Gaon: I Am..., Secret, Rock 'n' Roll Circus, Love Songs, Party Queen, Love Again, Colours.)	SGP (Note: The RIAS album chart operated from December 2001 to June 2005: I Am..., Rainbow, My Story,)	TWN (Note: Week references for G-Music: My Story 2005 week 28, (Miss)understood 2006 week 1, Secret 2006 week 47, A Best 2: White 2007 week 10, A Best 2: Black 2007 week 10 and 2007 week 11, Guilty 2008 week 1, Ayu-mi-x 6: Gold and Ayu-mi-x 6: Silver 2008 week 12, A Complete 2008 week 38, Next Level 2009 week 13, Rock 'n' Roll Circus 2010 week 16, Love Songs 2010 week 52, Ayu-mi-x 7 Version House, Ayu-mi-x 7 Version Acoustic Orchestra, Ayu-mi-x 7 Presents Ayu Trance 4 and Ayu-mi-x 7 Presents Ayu-ro Mix 4 2011 week 17, Five 2011 week 36, Party Queen 2012 week 12, A Summer Best 2012 week 32, Love 2012 week 45, Again 2012 week 49, A Classical 2013 week 1, Love Again 2013 week 6, A Best Live 2013 week 37, Colours 2014 week 29, Love Classics, A One, Sixxxxxx, Winter Diary.)	TWN East Asia	Sales	Certifications
A Song for ××	Released: January 1, 1999; Label: Avex; Formats: CD, cassette, digital download, vinyl	1	—	—	—	— (Note: Peaked at number 6 on IFPI Taiwan International Top 10 Albums Chart.)	—	JPN: 1,610,000	RIAJ: Million (Note: A Song for ×× received a 3× Platinum certification for 1,200,000 copies, however the 3× Platinum threshold was redefined as 750,000 copies in 2003.)
Loveppears	Released: November 10, 1999; Label: Avex; Formats: CD, cassette, digital download	1	—	—	—	—	—	JPN: 3,200,000	RIAJ: 2× Million
Duty	Released: September 27, 2000; Label: Avex; Formats: CD, cassette, vinyl, digital download	1	—	—	—	—	—	JPN: 2,985,000	RIAJ: 3× Million
I Am...	Released: January 1, 2002; Label: Avex; Formats: CD, cassette, digital download	1	—	36 (Note: Charted in 2010.)	3	—	—	JPN: 2,495,000; TWN: 115,000	RIAJ: 3× Million; RIT: 3× Platinum+Gold
Rainbow	Released: December 18, 2002; Label: Avex; Formats: CD, DVD-Audio, cassette, digital download	1	—	—	2	1	1	JPN: 1,920,000; TWN: 110,000	RIAJ: 2× Million
My Story	Released: December 15, 2004; Label: Avex; Formats: CD, CD/DVD, SACD, DVD-Audio, cassette, digital download	1	—	—	2	1	1 (Note: Released prior to the establishment of the G-Music chart.)	JPN: 1,200,000	RIAJ: Million
(Miss)understood	Released: January 1, 2006; Label: Avex; Formats: CD, CD/DVD, digital download	1	—	—	—	1	1	JPN: 1,030,000	RIAJ: Million
Secret	Released: November 29, 2006; Label: Avex; Formats: CD, CD/DVD, digital download	1	—	31 (Note: Charted in 2014.)	—	4	1	JPN: 710,000	RIAJ: 3× Platinum
Guilty	Released: January 1, 2008; Label: Avex; Formats: CD, CD/DVD, digital download	2	—	—	—	2	1	JPN: 610,000; TWN: 44,000; KOR: 1,908	RIAJ: 2× Platinum
Next Level	Released: March 25, 2009; Label: Avex; Formats: CD, CD/DVD, digital download, USB flash drive	1	—	—	—	2	1	JPN: 650,000; TWN: 26,000	RIAJ: 2× Platinum
Rock 'n' Roll Circus	Released: April 14, 2010; Label: Avex; Formats: CD, CD/DVD, digital download	1	—	73	—	4	1	JPN: 400,000	RIAJ: Platinum
Love Songs	Released: December 22, 2010; Label: Avex; Formats: CD, CD/DVD, digital download, USB flash drive	1	46	8	—	8	2	JPN: 300,000	RIAJ: Platinum
Party Queen	Released: March 21, 2012; Label: Avex; Formats: CD, CD/DVD, digital download	2	60	4	—	3	2	JPN: 170,000	RIAJ: Gold
Love Again	Released: February 8, 2013; Label: Avex; Formats: CD, CD/DVD, CD/Blu-ray, digital download	1	35	4	—	12	2	JPN: 110,000	RIAJ: Gold
Colours	Released: June 18, 2014; Label: Avex; Formats: CD, CD/DVD, CD/Blu-ray, digital download	5	75	16	—	7	1	JPN: 65,000	
A One	Released: April 8, 2015; Label: Avex; Formats: CD, CD/DVD, CD/Blu-ray, digital download	4	—	—	—	—	1	JPN: 70,000	
M(a)de in Japan	Released: June 29, 2016; Label: Avex; Formats: CD, CD/DVD, CD/Blu-ray, digital download	2	—	—	—	—	5	JPN: 55,000	
Remember You	Released: January 25, 2023; Label: Avex; Formats: CD, CD/DVD, CD/Blu-ray, digital download	6	—	—	—	—	1	JPN: 15,000	
"—" denotes items which were released before the creation of the G-Music or Gaon charts, or items that did not chart.

=== Compilation albums ===
List of albums, with selected chart positions
Title	Album details	Peak positions			Sales	Certifications
Title	Album details	JPN	TWN	TWN East Asia	Sales	Certifications
A Best	Released: March 28, 2001; Label: Avex; Formats: CD, cassette, digital download	1	—	—	WW: 5,000,000; JPN: 4,301,353	RIAJ: 4× Million
A Ballads	Released: March 12, 2003; Label: Avex; Formats: CD, cassette, digital download	1	2	1	JPN: 1,330,000; TWN: 80,000	RIAJ: Million (Note: A Ballads received a 4× Platinum certification for 1,600,000 copies, however the 4× Platinum threshold was depreciated in 2003.)
A Best 2: Black	Released: February 28, 2007; Label: Avex; Formats: CD, digital download	2	3	1	JPN: 970,000	RIAJ: Million
A Best 2: White	Released: February 28, 2007; Label: Avex; Formats: CD, digital download	1	2	1	JPN: 990,000	RIAJ: Million
A Complete: All Singles	Released: September 10, 2008; Label: Avex; Formats: CD, digital download	1	2	1	JPN: 1,120,000; TWN: 46,000	RIAJ (phy.): 3× Platinum; RIAJ (dig.): Gold
A Summer Best	Released: August 8, 2012; Label: Avex; Formats: CD, digital download	2	11	2	JPN: 210,000	RIAJ: Gold
mu-mo Gentei Hamasaki Ayumi 2013 Summer Best 3	Released: September 30, 2013; Label: Avex; Formats: digital download	—	—	—		
mu-mo Gentei Hamasaki Ayumi 2013 Summer Best 6	Released: September 30, 2013; Label: Avex; Formats: digital download	—	—	—		
Winter Ballad Selection	Released: November 26, 2014; Label: Avex; Formats: digital download	—	—	—		
A Theme Songs -Drama Edition-	Released: March 18, 2015; Label: Avex; Formats: digital download	—	—	—		
Rainy Season Selection	Released: June 19, 2019; Label: Avex; Formats: digital download	—	—	—		
Anime & Game Selection	Released: August 21, 2019; Label: Avex; Formats: digital download	—	—	—		
A Ballads 2	Released: April 8, 2021; Label: Avex; Formats: CD, digital download	3	—	—	JPN: 16,167	

=== Remix albums ===
List of albums, with selected chart positions
Title	Album details	Peak positions			Sales	Certifications
Title	Album details	JPN	TWN	TWN East Asia	Sales	Certifications
Ayu-mi-x	2-CD set featuring a club remix disc and an acoustic orchestra disc; Released: March 17, 1999; Label: Avex; Formats: CD, digital download	4	—	—	JPN: 480,000	RIAJ: Platinum
Super Eurobeat Presents Ayu-ro Mix	Released: February 16, 2000; Label: Avex; Formats: CD, digital download	2	—	—	JPN: 1,200,000	RIAJ: Million (Note: Super Eurobeat Presents Ayu-ro Mix received a 3× Platinum certification for 1,200,000 copies, however the 3× Platinum threshold was redefined as 750,000 copies in 2003.)
Ayu-mi-x II Version JPN	Released: March 8, 2000; Label: Avex; Formats: CD, digital download	6	—	—	JPN: 230,000	RIAJ: Gold
Ayu-mi-x II Version US+EU	Released: March 8, 2000; Label: Avex; Formats: CD, digital download	2	—	—	JPN: 300,000	RIAJ: Gold
Ayu-mi-x II Version Acoustic Orchestra	Released: March 8, 2000; Label: Avex; Formats: CD, digital download	2	—	—	JPN: 270,000	RIAJ: Gold
Ayu-mi-x II Version Non-Stop Mega Mix	Released: March 29, 2000; Label: Avex; Formats: CD, digital download	6	—	—	JPN: 620,000	RIAJ: Platinum
Ayu-mi-x III Non-Stop Mega Mix Version	Released: February 28, 2001; Label: Avex; Formats: CD, digital download	3	—	—	JPN: 400,000	RIAJ: Platinum
Ayu-mi-x III Acoustic Orchestra Version	Released: February 28, 2001; Label: Avex; Formats: CD, digital download	4	—	—	JPN: 250,000	RIAJ: Gold
Super Eurobeat Presents Ayu-ro Mix 2	Released: September 27, 2001; Label: Avex; Formats: CD, digital download	1	—	—	JPN: 560,000	RIAJ: Platinum
Cyber Trance Presents Ayu Trance	Released: September 27, 2001; Label: Avex; Formats: CD, digital download	3	—	—	JPN: 700,000	RIAJ: Platinum
Ayu-mi-x 4 + Selection Non-Stop Mega Mix Version	Released: March 20, 2002; Label: Avex; Formats: CD, digital download	4	—	—	JPN: 230,000	RIAJ: Gold
Ayu-mi-x 4 + Selection Acoustic Orchestra Version	Released: March 20, 2002; Label: Avex; Formats: CD, digital download	9	—	—	JPN: 150,000	RIAJ: Gold
Cyber Trance Presents Ayu Trance 2	Released: September 26, 2002; Label: Avex; Formats: CD, digital download	3	—	—	JPN: 400,000	RIAJ: Gold
Rmx Works from Ayu-mi-x 5 Non-Stop Mega Mix	Released: September 25, 2003; Label: Avex; Formats: CD, digital download	18	—	—	JPN: 70,000	RIAJ: Gold
Rmx Works from Cyber Trance Presents Ayu Trance 3	Released: September 25, 2003; Label: Avex; Formats: CD, digital download	14	—	—	JPN: 80,000	RIAJ: Gold
Rmx Works from Super Eurobeat Presents Ayu-ro Mix 3	Released: September 25, 2003; Label: Avex; Formats: CD, digital download	13	—	—	JPN: 100,000	RIAJ: Gold
My Story Classical	Released: March 24, 2005; Label: Avex; Formats: CD, digital download	4	—	—	JPN: 110,000	RIAJ: Gold
Ayu-mi-x 6: Gold	Released: March 26, 2008; Label: Avex; Formats: CD, digital download	6	13	5	JPN: 60,000	
Ayu-mi-x 6: Silver	Released: March 26, 2008; Label: Avex; Formats: CD, digital download	8	14	6	JPN: 50,000	
Ayu-mi-x 7 Version House	Released: April 20, 2011; Label: Avex; Formats: CD, digital download	7	—	7	JPN: 30,000	
Ayu-mi-x 7 Version Acoustic Orchestra	Released: April 20, 2011; Label: Avex; Formats: CD, digital download	5	—	6	JPN: 30,000	
Ayu-mi-x 7 Presents Ayu Trance 4	Released: April 20, 2011; Label: Avex; Formats: CD, digital download	6	—	9	JPN: 30,000	
Ayu-mi-x 7 Presents Ayu-ro Mix 4	Released: April 20, 2011; Label: Avex; Formats: CD, digital download	4	—	8	JPN: 30,000	
A Classical	Released: January 8, 2013; Label: Avex; Formats: CD, digital download	1	20	3	JPN: 40,000	
Love Classics	Released: January 28, 2015; Label: Avex; Formats: CD, digital download	16	—N/a	1	JPN: 10,000	
Winter Diary: A7 Classical	Released: December 23, 2015; Label: Avex; Formats: CD, digital download	11	—N/a	1	JPN: 10,000	
Trouble (Instrumental/Acapella)	Released: August 20, 2018; Label: Avex; Formats: digital download	—	—N/a	—		
Cyber Trance Presents Ayu Trance -Complete Edition-	Released: October 8, 2021; Label: Avex; Formats: digital download	—	—N/a	—		
Cyber Trance Presents Ayu Trance 2 -Complete Edition-	Released: November 17, 2021; Label: Avex; Formats: digital download	—	—N/a	—		
"—" denotes items which were released before the creation of the Gaon charts, or items that did not chart.

=== Live albums ===
List of albums, with selected chart positions
Title	Album details	Peak positions			Sales
Title	Album details	JPN	TWN	TWN East Asia	Sales
Power of Music 2011 A	Released: March 28, 2012; Label: Avex; Formats: Digital download	—	—	—	
15th Anniversary Tour: A Best Live	Released: October 18, 2013; Label: Avex; Formats: CD	7	15	5	JPN: 20,000
ayumi hamasaki COUNTDOWN LIVE 2013-2014 A ~setlist original ver. vol.1~	Released: March 12, 2014; Label: Avex; Formats: Digital download	—	—	—	
ayumi hamasaki COUNTDOWN LIVE 2013-2014 A ~setlist original ver. vol.2~	Released: March 12, 2014; Label: Avex; Formats: Digital download	—	—	—	
ayumi hamasaki LIVE TOUR -TROUBLE- 2018-2019 A SET LIST	Released: February 25, 2019; Label: Avex; Formats: Digital download	—	—	—	
ayumi hamasaki 21st anniversary -POWER of A^3- SET LIST	Released: April 26, 2019; Label: Avex; Formats: Digital download	—	—	—	
ayumi hamasaki TROUBLE TOUR 2019-2020 A -misunderstood-	Released: September 11, 2019; Label: Avex; Formats: Digital download	—	—	—	
ayumi hamasaki MUSIC for LIFE -return-	Released: September 8, 2021; Label: Avex; Formats: Digital download	—	—	—	
"—" denotes items which did not chart.

=== Box sets ===
List of box sets, with selected chart positions
Title	Album details	Peak positions
Title	Album details	JPN
Ayu-mi-x Box Set	Released: August 11, 1999; Label: Avex; Formats: LP	—
ayu-mi-x 7: Limited Complete Box Set	Released: April 20, 2011; Label: Avex; Formats: LP, CD	7
"—" denotes items which did not chart.

== Extended plays ==
List of extended plays, with selected chart positions
Title	Album details	Peak positions			Sales	Certifications
Title	Album details	JPN	TWN	TWN East Asia	Sales	Certifications
Nothing from Nothing	As "Ayumi featuring Dohzi-T and DJ Bass"; Released: December 1, 1995; Label: Nippon Columbia; Formats: CD	—	—	—	JPN: 1,000	
Memorial Address	Released: December 17, 2003; Label: Avex; Formats: CD, CD/DVD, cassette, digital download	1	2	1	JPN: 1,115,000	RIAJ: Million
Five	Released: August 31, 2011; Label: Avex; Formats: CD, CD/DVD, Blu-ray, digital download	1	7	2	JPN: 235,000	RIAJ: Gold
Love	Released: November 8, 2012; Label: Avex; Formats: CD, CD/DVD, digital download	4	4	1	JPN: 130,000	RIAJ: Gold
Again	Released: December 8, 2012; Label: Avex; Formats: CD, CD/DVD, digital download	7	16	2	JPN: 80,000	
Sixxxxxx	Released: August 5, 2015; Label: Avex; Formats: CD, CD/DVD, CD/Blu-ray, digital download	2	—	1	JPN: 55,000	
Trouble	Release date: August 15, 2018; Label: Avex; Formats: CD, CD/DVD, CD/Blu-ray, digital download	3	—	1	JPN: 45,000	
"—" denotes items which were released before the creation of the Gaon charts, or items that did not chart.

=== Remix extended plays ===
List of extended plays, with selected chart positions
Title	Album details	Peak positions	Sales
Title	Album details	JPN	Sales
The Other Side One: Hex Hector	Released: December 6, 2000; Label: Avex; Formats: CD	33	JPN: 10,000
The Other Side Two: Junior Vasquez	Released: January 31, 2001; Label: Avex; Formats: CD	10	JPN: 54,000
The Other Side Three: Thunderpuss, Soul Solution	Released: January 31, 2001; Label: Avex; Formats: CD	12	JPN: 50,000
The Other Side Four: System F, Vincent De Moor	Released: January 31, 2001; Label: Avex; Formats: CD	11	JPN: 54,000
Excerpts from Ayu-mi-x III: 001	Released: November 21, 2001; Label: Avex; Formats: CD	44	JPN: 21,000
Excerpts from Ayu-mi-x III: 002	Released: December 14, 2001; Label: Avex; Formats: CD	34	JPN: 18,000
Excerpts from Ayu-mi-x III: 003	Released: December 14, 2001; Label: Avex; Formats: CD	36	JPN: 17,000
Excerpts from Ayu-mi-x III: 004	Released: December 14, 2001; Label: Avex; Formats: CD	35	JPN: 17,000
Excerpts from Ayu-mi-x III: 005	Released: December 27, 2001; Label: Avex; Formats: CD	32	JPN: 16,000
Excerpts from Ayu-mi-x III: 006	Released: December 27, 2001; Label: Avex; Formats: CD	30	JPN: 16,000
EDMA	Released: June 18, 2014; Label: Avex; Formats: Digital download	—	—
"—" denotes items which did not chart.

== Singles ==
=== As a lead artist ===
==== 1990s ====
List of 1990s singles, with selected chart positions
Title	Year	Peak chart positions			Sales (JPN)	Certifications	Album
Title	Year	JPN	JPN Hot (Note: The Japan Hot 100 was established in February 2008.) (Note: Sources for chart positions are as follows: "Mirrorcle World", "Days", "Rule", "Sunrise (Love Is All)", "You Were...", "Moon", "Crossroad", "Dream On", "How Beautiful You Are", "Feel the Love", "Zutto...", "Step by Step".)	TWN	Sales (JPN)	Certifications	Album
"Poker Face"	1998	20	— (Note: Charted at number 81 on the Adult Alternative Airplay chart in 2008.)	—	105,000		A Song for ××
"You"	1998	20	—	—	130,000		A Song for ××
"Trust"	1998	9	—	—	225,000	RIAJ (physical): Gold	A Song for ××
"For My Dear..."	1998	9	—	—	128,000		A Song for ××
"Depend on You"	1998	6	—	—	190,000	RIAJ (physical): Gold	A Song for ××
"Whatever"	1999	5	—	4	225,000	RIAJ (physical): Gold	Loveppears
"Love (Destiny)"	1999	1	—	—	705,000	RIAJ (physical): Platinum	Loveppears
"To Be"	1999	4	—	—	410,000	RIAJ (physical): Platinum	Loveppears
"Boys & Girls"	1999	1	— (Note: Charted at number 33 on the Adult Alternative Airplay chart in 2008.)	—	1,120,000	RIAJ (physical): Million	Loveppears
A (Note: A is a four-sided A-side single featuring the songs "Monochrome", "Too Late", "Trauma" and "End Roll".)	1999	1	—	—	1,705,000	RIAJ (physical): Million (Note: "A" received a 4× Platinum certification for 1,600,000 copies, however the 4× Platinum threshold was depreciated in 2003.)	Loveppears
"Appears"	1999	2	—	—	390,000	RIAJ (physical): Gold	Loveppears
"Kanariya" ("Canary")	1999	1	—	—	400,000	RIAJ (physical): Gold	Loveppears
"—" denotes items which were released before the creation of the Billboard Japan Hot 100.

==== 2000s ====
List of 2000s singles, with selected chart positions
Title	Year	Peak chart positions					Sales (JPN)	Certifications	Album
Title	Year	JPN	JPN Hot	TWN	TWN East Asia (Note: Week references for G-Music: "Green/Days" 2008 week 50 and 2008 week 51, "Mirrorcle World", "Rule/Sparkle" 2009 week 9, "Sunrise/Sunset (Love Is All)" 2009 week 33, "You Were.../Ballad" 2009 week 52, "Moon/Blossom" 2010 week 29, "Crossroad" 2010 week 39, "L" 2010 week 40, "Dream On" 2010 week 52, "Feel the Love" 2013 week 52.)	GER	Sales (JPN)	Certifications	Album
"Fly High"	2000	3	—	—	—	—	303,000	RIAJ (physical): Gold	Loveppears
"Vogue"	2000	3	—	—	—	—	860,000	RIAJ (physical): 3× Platinum (Note: Vogue received a 2× Platinum certification for 800,000 copies, however the 2× Platinum threshold was redefined as 500,000 copies in 2003.)	Duty
"Far Away"	2000	2	—	—	—	—	592,000	RIAJ (physical): Platinum	Duty
"Seasons"	2000	1	— (Note: Charted at number 85 on the Adult Alternative Airplay chart in 2008.)	—	—	—	1,445,000	RIAJ (physical): Million (Note: "Seasons" received a 3× Platinum certification for 1,200,000 copies, however the 3× Platinum threshold was redefined as 750,000 copies in 2003.); RIAJ (digital): Platinum; RIAJ (streaming): Platinum	Duty
"Surreal"	2000	1	—	—	—	—	595,000	RIAJ (physical): Platinum	Duty
"Audience"	2000	2	—	—	—	—	335,000	RIAJ (physical): Gold	Duty
"M"	2000	1	86 (Note: Charted in 2020.)	—	—	—	1,600,000	RIAJ (physical): Million (Note: "M" received a 3× Platinum certification for 1,200,000 copies, however the 3× Platinum threshold was redefined as 750,000 copies in 2003.); RIAJ (digital): Platinum; RIAJ (streaming): Platinum	I Am...
"Evolution"	2001	1	— (Note: Charted at number 70 on the Adult Alternative Airplay chart in 2014.)	—	—	—	1,145,000	RIAJ (physical): 3× Platinum (Note: Evolution received a 2× Platinum certification for 800,000 copies, however the 2× Platinum threshold was redefined as 500,000 copies in 2003.); RIAJ (digital): Gold	I Am...
"Never Ever"	2001	1	—	—	—	—	850,000	RIAJ (physical): 3× Platinum (Note: Never Ever received a 2× Platinum certification for 800,000 copies, however the 2× Platinum threshold was redefined as 500,000 copies in 2003.)	I Am...
"Endless Sorrow"	2001	1	—	—	—	—	860,000	RIAJ (physical): 3× Platinum (Note: Endless Sorrow received a 2× Platinum certification for 800,000 copies, however the 2× Platinum threshold was redefined as 500,000 copies in 2003.)	I Am...
"Unite!"	2001	1	—	—	—	—	663,000	RIAJ (physical): Platinum	I Am...
"Dearest"	2001	1	— (Note: Charted at number 85 on the Adult Alternative Airplay chart in 2008.)	—	—	—	825,000	RIAJ (physical): 3× Platinum (Note: Dearest received a 2× Platinum certification for 800,000 copies, however the 2× Platinum threshold was redefined as 500,000 copies in 2003.); RIAJ (digital): Gold	I Am...
"Daybreak"	2002	2	—	—	—	—	260,000	RIAJ (physical): Gold	I Am...
"Free & Easy"	2002	1	—	—	—	—	555,000	RIAJ (physical): Platinum	Rainbow
H (Note: H is a three-sided A-side single featuring the songs "Independent", "July 1st" and "Hanabi".)	2002	1	—	—	—	—	1,170,000	RIAJ (physical): Million	Rainbow
"Voyage"	2002	1	—	—	—	—	760,000	RIAJ (physical): 3× Platinum; RIAJ (digital): Platinum; RIAJ (streaming): Gold	Rainbow
"Connected" (Note: Connected was only released in Europe.)	2003	—	—	—	—	89			I Am...
& (Note: & is a triple A-side single featuring the songs "Ourselves", "Greatful Days" and "Hanabi (Episode II)".)	2003	1	—	—	—	—	680,000	RIAJ (physical): 2× Platinum	Memorial Address
"Forgiveness"	2003	1	—	—	—	—	260,000	RIAJ (physical): Platinum	Memorial Address
"No Way to Say"	2003	1	—	—	—	—	425,000	RIAJ (physical): Platinum; RIAJ (digital): Gold	Memorial Address
"Moments"	2004	1	—	—	—	—	370,000	RIAJ (ringtone): 2× Platinum; RIAJ (physical): Platinum; RIAJ (digital): Gold	My Story
"Inspire"	2004	1	—	—	—	—	390,000	RIAJ (ringtone): 3× Platinum; RIAJ (physical): Platinum	My Story
"Carols"	2004	1	—	—	—	—	375,000	RIAJ (ringtone): Million; RIAJ (physical): Platinum	My Story
"Step You"	2005	1	—	—	—	—	385,000	RIAJ (ringtone): 3× Platinum; RIAJ (physical): Platinum; RIAJ (cellphone): Gold	(Miss)understood
"Is This Love?"	2005	1	—	—	—		385,000		(Miss)understood
"Fairyland"	2005	1	—	—	—	—	393,000	RIAJ (ringtone): 3× Platinum; RIAJ (physical): Platinum; RIAJ (cellphone): Gold	(Miss)understood
"Heaven"	2005	1	—	—	—	—	370,000	RIAJ (ringtone): Million; RIAJ (physical): Platinum; RIAJ (cellphone): Gold	(Miss)understood
"Bold & Delicious"	2005	1	—	—	—	—	237,000	RIAJ (physical): Platinum	(Miss)understood
"Pride"	2005	1	—	—	—	—	237,000		(Miss)understood
"Startin'"	2006	1	—	—	—	—	299,000	RIAJ (physical): Platinum; RIAJ (cellphone): Gold	Secret
"Born to Be..."	2006	1	—	—	—	—	299,000		Secret
"Blue Bird"	2006	1	—	—	—	—	295,000	RIAJ (ringtone): 3× Platinum; RIAJ (cellphone): Gold; RIAJ (physical): Platinum; RIAJ (digital): Platinum; RIAJ (streaming): Gold	Secret
"Glitter"	2007	1	—	—	—	—	246,000	RIAJ (ringtone): 2× Platinum; RIAJ (cellphone): Gold; RIAJ (digital): Platinum; RIAJ (physical): Gold	Guilty
"Fated"	2007	1	—	—	—	—	246,000	RIAJ (digital): Gold	Guilty
"Talkin' 2 Myself"	2007	1	—	—	—	—	191,000	RIAJ (physical): Gold; RIAJ (digital): Gold	Guilty
"Together When..." (Note: Though it was released exclusively in digital formats, "Together When..." was marketed as and called a single by Hamasaki's official website.)	2007	—	—	—	—	—		RIAJ (ringtone): 3× Platinum; RIAJ (cellphone): Platinum	Guilty
"Mirrorcle World"	2008	1	2	—	5	—	248,000	RIAJ (physical): Platinum; RIAJ (cellphone): Gold	A Complete
"Green"	2008	1	—	5	1	—	225,000	RIAJ (cellphone): Gold	Next Level
"Days"	2008	1	1	5	1	—	225,000	RIAJ (ringtone): 2× Platinum; RIAJ (cellphone): Platinum; RIAJ (physical): Gold	Next Level
"Rule"	2009	1	1	3	1	—	171,000	RIAJ (cellphone): Gold; RIAJ (digital): Platinum; RIAJ (physical): Gold	Next Level
"Sparkle"	2009	1	—	3	1	—	171,000		Next Level
"Sunrise (Love Is All)"	2009	1	2	10	3	—	130,000	RIAJ (ringtone): 2× Platinum; RIAJ (cellphone): Platinum; RIAJ (physical): Gold	Rock 'n' Roll Circus
"Sunset (Love Is All)"	2009	1	—	10	3	—	130,000	RIAJ (digital): Gold	Rock 'n' Roll Circus
"You Were..."	2009	1	14	15	2	—	140,000	RIAJ (ringtone): 2× Platinum; RIAJ (cellphone): Platinum; RIAJ (digital): Platinum; RIAJ (physical): Gold	Rock 'n' Roll Circus
"Ballad"	2009	1	—	15	2	—	140,000		Rock 'n' Roll Circus
"—" denotes items which were released before the creation of the Billboard Japan Hot 100, the creation of the G-Music charts.

==== 2010s ====
List of 2010s singles, with selected chart positions
Title	Year	Peak chart positions				Sales (JPN)	Certifications	Album
Title	Year	JPN	JPN Hot	TWN	TWN East Asia	Sales (JPN)	Certifications	Album
"Moon"	2010	1	4	6	1	115,000	RIAJ (cellphone): Gold; RIAJ (physical): Gold	Love Songs
"Blossom"	2010	1	—	6	1	115,000		Love Songs
"Crossroad"	2010	1	3	8	2	120,000	RIAJ (digital): Gold; RIAJ (physical): Gold	Love Songs
L (Note: L is a triple A-side single featuring the songs "Virgin Road", "Sweet Season" and "Last Angel".)	2010	1	— (Note: Charted at number 1 on the Hot Singles Sales chart.)	6	1	120,000	RIAJ (physical): Gold	Love Songs
"How Beautiful You Are" (Note: Though it was released exclusively in digital formats, "How Beautiful You Are" was marketed as and called a single by Hamasaki's official website.)	2012	—	52	—	—		RIAJ (digital): Gold	Party Queen
"Feel the Love"	2013	5	12	20	3	45,000		Colours
"Merry-Go-Round"	2013	5	—	20	3	45,000		Colours
"Terminal"	2014	24	— (Note: Charted at number 31 on the Hot Singles Sales chart.)	—	—	5,000		Colours
"Zutto..." ("Always")	2014	5	31	—	—	40,000		A One
"Last Minute"	2014	5	—	—	—	40,000		A One
"Walk"	2014	5	—	—	—	40,000		A One
"Step by Step" (Note: Though it was released exclusively in digital formats, "Step by Step" was marketed as and called a single by Hamasaki's official website.)	2015	—	21	—	—			Sixxxxxx
"We Are the Queens"	2016	—	79	—	—			Trouble
"—" denotes items which were not released in a physical format, were not released in a certain territory or did not chart.

==== 2020s ====
List of 2020s singles, with selected chart positions
Title	Year	Peak chart positions				Sales (JPN) (Note: Sources for sales are as follows: "Ohia no Ki", "Dreamed a Dream", "23rd Monster", "Nonfiction", "Summer Again", "Mask", "Jidai", "Aurora" and "Mimosa".)	Certifications	Album
Title	Year	JPN	JPN Dig. (Note: Sources for chart positions are as follows: "Ohia no Ki", "Dreamed a Dream", "23rd Monster", "Nonfiction", "Summer Again", "Mask", "Jidai", "Aurora" and "Mimosa")	JPN Hot	JPN DL	Sales (JPN)	Certifications	Album
"Ohia no Ki" ("Ohia Tree")	2020	—	14	—	14	11,000		Remember You
"Dreamed a Dream"	2020	—	22	—	16	5,000		Remember You
"23rd Monster"	2021	—	29	—	30	3,000		Remember You
"Nonfiction"	2022	—	12	—	12	4,000		Remember You
"Summer Again"	2022	—	18	—	20	3,000		Remember You
"Mask"	2022	—	24	—	25	3,000		Remember You
"Jidai" ("Era")	2024	—	31	—	31	2,000		TBA
"Bye-Bye"	2024	—	25	—	27	2,000		TBA
"Aurora"	2024	—	25	—	26	2,000		TBA
"Mimosa"	2025	34	6	69	6	39,000		TBA
"—" denotes items which were not released in a physical format, were not released in a certain territory or did not chart.

=== As a collaborating artist ===
List of singles, with selected chart positions
Title	Year	Peak chart positions			Sales (JPN)	Certifications	Album
Title	Year	JPN	JPN Hot	TWN East Asia	Sales (JPN)	Certifications	Album
"Nothing from Nothing" (with Dohzi-T and DJ Bass)	1995	—	—	—			Nothing from Nothing
"A Song Is Born" (with Keiko)	2001	1	—	—	510,000	RIAJ (physical): Platinum	Song Nation / I Am...
"Dream On" (with Naoya Urata)	2010	1	12	7	55,000		Non-album singles
"Ashita Waratteirareru Yō ni" (明日笑っていられるように; "To Be Able to Laugh Tomorrow") (with Tokyo Purin)	2014	97	— (Note: Charted at number 98 on the Hot Singles Sales chart.)	—	900		Non-album singles
"Seasons" (AK-69 feauturing Ayumi Hamasaki)	2026	—	—	—	3,400		Non-album singles
"—" denotes items which were released before the creation of the G-Music Chart or the Billboard Japan Hot 100, did not chart or were not released in that region.

=== Promotional singles ===
List of promotional singles or non-billed A-sides, with selected chart positions
Title	Year	Peak chart positions			Certifications	Album
Title	Year	JPN Hot (Note: Sources for chart positions are as follows: "Next Level", "Microphone", "Virgin Road", "Love Song", "Why...", "Progress", "You & Me", "Song 4 U", "Pray", "Movin' On Without You".)	JPN RIAJ Mont. (Note: The RIAJ "Reco-kyō" monthly ringtone chart is a depreciated chart that ran from 2006 until 2009.) (Note: Sources for chart positions are as follows: "Ladies Night", "1 Love", "Jewel", "Momentum", "Part of Me", "Memorial Address", "Secret", "Decision", "(Don't) Leave Me Alone", "My All", "Guilty", "Untitled (For Her)", "Mirror", "Life", "Who...", "Next Level".)	JPN RIAJ (Note: The RIAJ Digital Track Chart is a depreciated chart that ran from 2009 until early 2012 and tracked full-length cellphone downloads.) (Note: Sources for chart positions are as follows: "Next Level", "Microphone", "Love Song", "Why...", "Another Song", "Progress", "Happening Here", "Curtain Call", ""Fairyland-Glitter-Blue Bird-Greatful Days-July 1st" Mega-Mash-Up-Mix", "Don't Look Back", "Sexy Little Things", "Lady Dynamite", "Countdown", "Meaning of Love", "Last Links", "Seven Days War", "Virgin Road", "Sweet Season", "Last Angel", "Beloved", "Brillante", "Party Queen", "Return Road".)	Certifications	Album
"Jewel"	2006	—	4	—	RIAJ (ringtone): 3× Platinum; RIAJ (cellphone): Platinum	Secret
"Who..." (Note: Originally released on Loveppears (1999), a re-recorded version was used to promote her compilation album A Complete: All Singles.)	2008	— (Note: Charted at number 49 on the Adult Alternative Airplay chart in 2008.)	19	—	RIAJ (digital): Platinum	A Complete: All Singles
"Next Level"	2009	89	16	23	RIAJ (digital): Gold	Next Level
"Microphone"	2010	33	—	10		Rock 'n' Roll Circus
"Virgin Road"	2010	2	—	6	RIAJ (cellphone): Gold	L (single) / Love Songs
"Sweet Season"	2010	—	—	23		L (single) / Love Songs
"Last Angel"	2010	—	—	37		L (single) / Love Songs
"Love Song"	2010	39	—	4	RIAJ (cellphone): Gold	Love Songs
"Why..." (featuring Juno)	2011	95	—	6		Five
"Progress"	2011	41	—	2	RIAJ (cellphone): Gold; RIAJ (digital): Platinum	Five
"Another Song" (featuring Naoya Urata)	2011	—	—	8		Five
"Happening Here"	2011	—	—	42		A Summer Best
"You & Me"	2012	33	—	—	RIAJ (digital): Gold	A Summer Best
"Song 4 U"	2012	44	—	—	RIAJ (digital): Gold	Love / Love Again
"Wake Me Up"	2012	—	—	—		Again / Love Again
"Tell All"	2013	—	—	—		Non-album single
"Pray"	2014	76	—	—		Colours
"Hello New Me"	2014	29	—	—	RIAJ (digital): Gold	Colours
"XOXO" (Note: Released as a plug air, a smart phone device that accesses streaming data.)	2014	—	—	—		Colours
"Movin' on Without You"	2014	36	—	—		Utada Hikaru no Uta / A One
"Words"	2017	—	—	—		Trouble
"My All (Chinese Version)"	2020	—	—	—		Non-album single
"Haru yo, Koi"	2021	—	—	—		A Ballads 2 / Remember you
"—" denotes items that were released before the creation of the Japan Hot 100, or before or after the RIAJ monthly ringtones chart and digital track chart.

== Other charted songs ==
List of songs not released as singles or promotional singles, with selected chart positions and certifications
Title	Year	Peak chart positions		Certifications	Album
Title	Year	JPN RIAJ Mont.	JPN RIAJ	Certifications	Album
"A Song for ××"	1999	—	—	RIAJ (cellphone): Gold	A Song for ××
"Teddy Bear"	2000	—	—	RIAJ (digital): Gold	Duty
"Memorial Address"	2003	—	82	RIAJ (digital): Gold	Memorial Address
"Ladies Night"	2006	71	—	RIAJ (digital): Gold	(Miss)understood
"Momentum"	2006	20	—	RIAJ (digital): Gold	Secret
"1 Love"	2006	73	—		Secret
"Secret"	2006	45	—		Secret
"Part of Me"	2007	14	—	RIAJ (cellphone): Gold	A Best 2: Black
"Decision"	2007	35	—		Guilty
"(Don't) Leave Me Alone"	2008	29	—		Guilty
"My All"	2008	36	—	RIAJ (cellphone): Gold	Guilty
"Guilty"	2008	54	—		Guilty
"Untitled (For Her)"	2008	84	—		Guilty
"Mirror"	2008	93	—		Guilty
"Life"	2008	22	—		"Mirrorcle World" (single)
"Curtain Call"	2009	—	88		Next Level
""Fairyland-Glitter-Blue Bird-Greatful Days-July 1st" Mega-Mash-Up-Mix"	2009	—	45		Non-album song
"Don't Look Back"	2010	—	20		Rock 'n' Roll Circus
"Sexy Little Things"	2010	—	52		Rock 'n' Roll Circus
"Lady Dynamite"	2010	—	66		Rock 'n' Roll Circus
"Count Down"	2010	—	67		Rock 'n' Roll Circus
"Meaning of Love"	2010	—	49		Rock 'n' Roll Circus
"Last Links"	2010	—	50		Rock 'n' Roll Circus
"Seven Days War"	2010	—	40		"Crossroad" (single) / Love Songs
"Beloved"	2011	—	4		Five
"Brillante"	2011	—	53		Five
"Party Queen"	2012	—	23		Party Queen
"Return Road"	2012	—	85		Party Queen
"Many Classic Moments"	2015	—	33		#Globe20th -Special Cover Best- / Made in Japan
"—" denotes items that were released before or after the RIAJ monthly ringtones chart and digital track chart existed.

== Other appearances ==
List of non-studio album or guest appearances that feature Ayumi Hamasaki
Title	Year	Album
"A" (m.c.A.T featuring Ayumi Hamasaki)	1998	Avex the Album
"Someday My Prince Will Come" (Note: Packaged with a special edition of the home media Japanese release of the Disney film Snow White and the Seven Dwarfs on October 12, 2001.)	2001	Non-album song
"A Song Is Born (Tatsumaki Remix)"	2002	Song Nation 2 Trance
"A (La French Mix)" (m.c.A.T featuring Ayumi Hamasaki)	2004	Returns!
"Carols (S.T.F. Remix)"	2005	Super Best Trance Presents Super J-Trance Best
"Inspire (Energy Inspire Remix)"	2005	Gazen Parapara!! Presents Super J-Euro Best
"Teens" (TRF meets Ayumi Hamasaki)	2006	Lif-e-Motions
"It Was (Island mix)" (Note: August 2007 digital release along with "Glitter (Soul Central remix)" on Mu-Mo.)	2007	Non-album song
"Thx a Lot" (A-Nation's Party)	2010	Digitalian Is Eating Breakfast 2
"My Way" (M-Flo + Ayumi Hamasaki)	2014	Future Is Wow
"Movin' on Without You"	2014	Utada Hikaru no Uta
"One Night Carnival"	2022	All Night Carnival
