= Ayu-mi-x 7 =

- Cover of Ayu-mi-x 7 Version House. Other versions' cover carry similar style of design.

Remix album series by Ayumi Hamasaki
- Released: April 20, 2011
- Recorded: 1998–2011
- Genre: Various
- Label: Avex Trax

Ayumi Hamasaki chronology
Ayu-mi-x 6 (2008)	Ayu-mi-x 7 (2011)

Ayu-mi-x 7 (stylized as ayu-mi-x 7) is a series of remix albums by Japanese musician Ayumi Hamasaki, served as the seventh installments to the parent release Ayu-mi-x. The albums were originally scheduled to be released on March 30, but it was postponed due to the 2011 Tohoku earthquake and tsunami and were released on April 20. A limited box set contains all versions along with a bonus disc were also released on the same day.

== Release ==
Ayu-mi-x 7: Limited Complete Box Set (stylized as ayu-mi-x 7 -LIMITED COMPLETE BOX-) contains all versions along with a special non-stop megamix bonus disc made with selected remixes from four albums and 13 LP-sized posters of her previous Ayu-mi-x covers.

All albums contains the remixes of Ayumi's each 50 singles

== Track listings ==
Ayu-mi-x 7 Version House
No.	Title	Music	Remixer(s)	Length
1.	"To Be" (Jonathan Peters Club Mix)	Dai Nagao	Jonathan Peters	5:56
2.	"Dearest" (Razor 'N Guido Club Mix)	Crea + DAI	Razor N' Guido	5:54
3.	"For My Dear..." (House Nation Remix)	Yasuhiko Hoshino	Tetsuya Tamura	4:03
4.	"Mirrorcle World" (Johnny Vicious Club Mix)	Yuta Nakano; Tetsuya Yukumi; Hoshino; Kazuhito Kikuchi	Johnny Vicious	5:30
5.	"Fairyland" (Hex Hector Remix)	Tasuku; Shintarou Hagiwara; Sousaku Sasaki	Hex Hector	5:28
6.	"No Way to Say" (Sugiurumn Remix)	Bounceback	Sugiurumn	3:48
7.	"Appears" (Shinichi Osawa Remix)	Kikuchi	Shinichi Osawa	4:00
8.	"Bold & Delicious" (Dub's Standard House Remix)	Geo of Sweetbox	Dub Master X	5:13
9.	"Voyage" (Turbo's Circuit Mix)	Crea + DAI	Turbo	4:15
10.	"M" (Remo-Con Remix)	Crea + DAI	Tamura	3:30
11.	"Unite!" (EK's Big Room Remix)	Crea	Eric Kupper	4:57
12.	"Crossroad" (Johnny Vicious Club Mix)	Tetsuya Komuro	Vicious	4:11

Ayu-mi-x 7 Version Acoustic Orchestra
No.	Title	Music	Arranger(s)	Length
1.	"Whatever"	Kikuchi	Izumi Miyazaki; CMJK^{[a]}	5:21
2.	"Hanabi"	Crea + DAI	CMJK; Shingo Kobayashi^{[a]}	4:57
3.	"Moments"	Yukumi	Hikari; Akimitsu Homma^{[a]}	5:57
4.	"Kanariya"	Hoshino	CPM-Marvin; Yuta Nakano^{[a]}	4:25
5.	"Heaven"	Kikuchi	Yuta Nakano; KZB; Homma^{[a]}	4:24
6.	"Never Ever"	Hamasaki	Chokkaku; Homma^{[a]}	4:36
7.	"Trust"	Takashi Kimura	Akimitsu Honma^{[b]}; Kimura	5:10
8.	"Audience"	DAI	HΛL; Homma^{[a]}	3:50
9.	"Evolution"	Hamasaki	HΛL; Yuta Nakano^{[a]}	4:38
10.	"Blue Bird"	DAI	HΛL; Homma^{[a]}	3:59
11.	"You Were..."	Kazuhiro Hara	HΛL; CMJK^{[a]}	5:00
12.	"Forgiveness"	Crea + DAI	CMJK; Kobayashi^{[a]}	5:44
13.	"Love (Destiny)"	Tsunku	Kobayashi; Yasuaki Maejima; Nobuyuki Tsujii^{[a]}	5:57

Ayu-mi-x 7 Presents Ayu Trance 4
No.	Title	Music	Remixer(s)	Length
1.	"Far Away" (Alex M.O.R.P.H. Extended Rmx)	Kikuchi; DAI	Alex M.O.R.P.H.; Dennis Schimonik	3:49
2.	"Moon" (Clokx Remix)	Hoshino	Clokx	4:30
3.	"Seasons" (John O'Callaghan Remix)	DAI	John O'Callaghan	4:00
4.	"Days" (Aly & Fila Remix)	Kunio Tago	Aly & Fila	4:51
5.	"Poker Face" (Ronald Van Gelderen Extended Remix)	Hoshino	Ronald Van Gelderen	3:59
6.	"Monochrome" (Remo-Con Classic Trance Remix)	HΛL	Remo-con	3:51
7.	"Rule" (Public Domain Remix)	Miki Watanabe	Public Domain	3:42
8.	"Vogue" (Groove Coverage Remix)	Kikuchi	Groove Coverage	3:57
9.	"Endless Sorrow" (Dance Nation Remix)	Hamasaki	Brad Grobler; Rob Janssen	4:46
10.	"You" (Ramon Zenker Remix)	Hoshino	Ramon Zenker	4:03
11.	"Greatful Days" (DJ Joker & Heavens Wire Remix)	Hamasaki	Hiroshi Tenjin; Shohei Matsumoto	5:25
12.	"Carols" (Push Remix)	Tomoya Kinoshita	Push	5:25

Ayu-mi-x 7 Presents Ayu-ro Mix 4
No.	Title	Music	Producer(s)	Length
1.	"Step You" (Morris Capaldi versus Ayumi Hamasaki RMX)	Hara	Morris Capaldi; Silvio Moretti	3:43
2.	"Glitter" (AKBK "DJ Command" Remix)	Hara	Hiroshige "DJ Command" Youhei^{[c]}; Katsunari "DJ Mocchi" Mochizuki^{[c]}	3:41
3.	"Surreal" (Dima Euro Remix 2011)	Kikuchi	Nuanchan Chanthawongsa; Davide Di Marcantonio	4:28
4.	"Daybreak" (Plum Mix)	Hamasaki; D.A.I; Junichi Matsuda	M.O.R.^{[c]}	4:52
5.	"Sunrise (Love is All)" (Accatino - Rimonti - Festari Remix)	Hana Nishimura	Claudio Accatino^{[c]}; Federico Rimonti^{[c]}; Roberto Festari^{[c]}	4:22
6.	"Fly High" (The Cloud Upstairs SCP Version)	Nagao	Stefano Castagna; SCP-Music Team^{[c]}	3:51
7.	"Boys & Girls" (Sunny Day SCP Version)	Nagao	Castagna; SCP-Music Team^{[c]}	2:41
8.	"Startin'" (EuroGrooves 2011 Rmx)	Hara	Sergio Dall'Ora^{[d]}; Luca Degani^{[c]}	4:10
9.	"Inspire" (AKBK "Valle Blanco" Remix)	Yukumi	DJ Mocchi; Shirasawa "Valle Blanco" Ryo^{[c]}	4:04
10.	"Talkin' 2 Myself" (EuroGrooves Fashion Mix)	Nakano	Dall'Ora^{[d]}; Degani	4:09
11.	"Free & Easy" (Plum Mix)	Crea + D.A.I	NRG Factory^{[c]}	3:51
12.	"Depend on You" (Eurobeat GoGo's Remix)	Kikuchi	Domino^{[c]}; Sandro Oliva^{[c]}	5:14

Bonus CD: Non-stop Megamix

1. Vogue (Groove Coverage Remix)
2. Far Away (Alex M.O.R.P.H. Extended rmx)
3. Seasons (John O'Callaghan Remix)
4. Step You (Morris Capaldi versus Ayumi Hamasaki RMX)
5. Surreal (Dima Euro Remix 2011)
6. Sunrise (Love is All) (Accatino - Rimonti - Festari Remix)
7. Fairyland (Hex Hector Remix)
8. To Be (Jonathan Peters Club Mix)
9. Whatever (Arranged by CMJK)
10. Trust (Arranged by Akimitsu Homma)
11. Audience (Arranged by Akimitsu Homma)
12. Depend on You (Eurobeat GoGo's remix)
13. Glitter (AKBK "DJ Command" Remix)
14. Monochrome (Remo-Con Classic Trance Remix)
15. Moon (Clokx Remix)
16. Crossroad (Johnny Vicious Club Mix)
17. For My Dear... (House Nation Remix)
18. Dearest (Razor 'N Guido Club Mix)
19. Hanabi (Arranged by Shingo Kobayashi)
20. Moments (Arranged by Akimitsu Homma)

Notes

- ^{^a} – denotes an additional arranger
- ^{^b} – denotes an original and additional arranger
- ^{^c} – denotes a remixer
- ^{^d} – denotes a producer and a remixer

== Charts ==
=== Ayu-mi-x 7 Version House ===
Release	Chart	Peak position	Debut sales	Sales total
April 20, 2011	Oricon Daily Charts	6		
April 20, 2011	Oricon Weekly Charts	7	14,234	
April 20, 2011	Oricon Monthly Charts	26	17,197	18,771

=== Ayu-mi-x 7 Version Acoustic Orchestra ===
Release	Chart	Peak position	Debut sales	Sales total
April 20, 2011	Oricon Daily Charts	4		
April 20, 2011	Oricon Weekly Charts	5	14,360	
April 20, 2011	Oricon Monthly Charts	25	17,209	18,687

=== Ayu-mi-x 7 Presents Ayu Trance 4 ===
Release	Chart	Peak position	Debut sales	Sales total
April 20, 2011	Oricon Daily Charts	5		
April 20, 2011	Oricon Weekly Charts	6	14,262	
April 20, 2011	Oricon Monthly Charts	27	17,152	18,672

=== Ayu-mi-x 7 Presents Ayu-ro Mix 4 ===
Release	Chart	Peak position	Debut sales	Sales total
April 20, 2011	Oricon Daily Charts	3	6,857	
April 20, 2011	Oricon Weekly Charts	4	14,585	
April 20, 2011	Oricon Monthly Charts	23	17,699	19,288
