= Ayu-mi-x =

Remix album by Ayumi Hamasaki
- Released: March 17, 1999
- Recorded: 1998
- Genres: J-pop, electronic dance music, classical
- Length: 2:10:49
- Label: Avex Trax
- Producer: Max Matsuura

Ayumi Hamasaki chronology
Ayu-mi-x (1999)	Super Eurobeat Presents Ayu-ro Mix (2000)

Ayu-mi-x (stylized as ayu-mi-x) is the first remix album by Japanese musician Ayumi Hamasaki. It was released on March 17, 1999, to promote A Song for ××. Ayu-mi-x remix album contains 2 discs. Disc 1 is the Remix Club Side which contains dance remixes. Disc 2 is the Acoustic Orchestra Side which contains orchestral remixes and 3 dub mixes.

== Track listing ==
All lyrics are written by Ayumi Hamasaki.

Disc one: Remix Club Side
No.	Title	Music	Arranger(s)	Length
1.	"Poker Face" (Spiritual Guidance Mix)	Yasuhiko Hoshino	Akimitsu Honma	6:29
2.	"Hana" (D-Z Deadly Rose Approach)	Hoshino	Hoshino	6:57
3.	"Signal" (Y & Co. Taste)	Hideaki Kuwabara	Honma	5:08
4.	"Depend on You" (Dub's Electro Remix)	Kazuhito Kikuchi	Honma	4:46
5.	"Friend II" (Make My Mad Mix)	Mitsuru Igarashi	Igarashi	6:29
6.	"Hana" (Dub's Trance Remix)	Hoshino	Hoshino	6:43
7.	"Powder Snow" (Dub's Sentimental Remix)	Kuwabara	Honma	4:44
8.	"Trust" (Groove that Soul Mix)	Takashi Kimura	Honma; Kimura	5:08
9.	"Signal" (Groove that Soul Mix)	Kuwabara	Honma	5:08
10.	"As If..." (DJ-Turbo Wish Mix)	Kikuchi	Honma	5:08
11.	"You" (Masters of Funk R&B Remix)	Hoshino	Honma	5:08
12.	"From Your Letter" (DJ Hasebe Remix)	Akio Togashi	Togashi	5:08
13.	"Two of Us" (Rub Delight Mix)	Kikuchi	Honma; Takashi Morio	5:08
14.	"A Song for ××" (Dub's Loverdub Remix)	Hoshino	Hoshino	5:08

=== Acoustic Orchestra Side ===
1. Prologue
2. A Song for ××
3. Hana
4. Poker Face
5. Wishing
6. You
7. As If...
8. Powder Snow
9. Depend on You
10. For My Dear...
11. Wishing (Refreshing Mix)
12. You (Fine Mix)
13. From Your Letter (Dub You Crazy Mix)

== Chart positions ==
Chart (1999)	Peak position
Japan Oricon	4

- Total sales: 396,800 (Japan)
