= A Film for XX =

Video by Ayumi Hamasaki
- Released: September 15, 1999
- Label: Avex Trax
- Director: Masashi Muto; Wataru Takeishi; Yokoh Odagami

Ayumi Hamasaki chronology
Ayu-mi-x (1999)	A Film for XX (1999)	Loveppears (1999)

Ayumi Hamasaki video chronology
A Film for XX (1999)	A Clips (2000)

A Film for XX (stylized as A Film for ××) is the first video album by Japanese musician Ayumi Hamasaki. It was released on September 15, 1999, on x9. It sold 38,000 copies and charted on the Oricon video charts.

== Track listing ==
No.	Title	Director(s)	Length
1.	"Poker Face"	Wataru Takeishi	3:34
2.	"You"	Takeishi	4:17
3.	"Trust"	Takeishi	1:03
4.	"For My Dear..."	Hiromitsu Odagami	3:31
5.	"Depend on You"	Masashi Muto	4:38
6.	"A Song for XX" (TV-Spot Version)		4:14
7.	"Powder Snow" (TV-Spot Version)		6:42
8.	"Ayu-mi-x" (TV-Spot)		3:21
9.	"Boys & Girls" (Aube Original Mix)	Takeishi	3:37
