= A Song for ×× =

- Album cover is printed on a metallic material.

Studio album by Ayumi Hamasaki
- Released: January 1, 1999
- Recorded: 1998
- Studio: Prime Sound Studio Aoyama (Tokyo); Studio Sound Dali (Tokyo); Tower Side (Tokyo); Conway Recording Studios (Los Angeles)
- Genre: Pop
- Length: 70:38
- Label: Avex Trax
- Producer: Max Matsuura

Ayumi Hamasaki chronology
Nothing from Nothing (1995)	A Song for ×× (1999)	Loveppears (1999)

Singles from A Song for ××
- 1. "Poker Face" Released: April 8, 1998; 2. "You" Released: June 10, 1998; 3. "Trust" Released: August 5, 1998; 4. "For My Dear..." Released: October 7, 1998; 5. "Depend on You" Released: December 9, 1998

A Song for ×× (the "××" is silent) is the debut studio album by Japanese singer Ayumi Hamasaki, released on January 1, 1999, by Avex Trax. Written by Hamasaki, it was produced by Japanese musician Max Matsuura. Primarily a pop rock album, it features musical composition and arrangements by Yasuhiko Hoshino, Mitsuru Igarashi of Every Little Thing fame, and others. In this album, Hamasaki wrote about the loneliness, confusion and uncertainty about life, expressed her hopes and expectations for the future, and her gratitude to the fans who love her.

Upon its release, A Song for ×× garnered mixed-to-positive reviews from music critics, with some praising Hamasaki's commercial appeal but others deeming the record cautious and childish. The album became a commercial success, debuting atop the Oricon Albums Chart with first-week sales of over half a million copies; it topped the chart for five weeks. The album was certified Million by the Recording Industry Association of Japan (RIAJ) for shipments exceeding one million copies in the country. To date, the album is one of the best-selling LPs in Japanese music history and remains one of Hamasaki's highest-selling works.

To promote the album, Hamasaki released five singles, beginning with "Poker Face" as the album's lead single on April 8, 1998. Entering the Oricon Singles Chart at number twenty, it became her first charting single ever. Four further singles were released: "You," "Trust," "For My Dear...," and "Depend on You." All of them were top-20 hits in Japan, with the latter three reaching the top 10. Hamasaki promoted the album with several public appearances throughout 1998 and 1999.

== Background and development ==
"No matter how much you’re disliked, if what truly matters is firmly within you, then once it’s understood, the greater the degree of dislike, the more strongly the pendulum will swing the other way. From ‘hate’ it will swing powerfully to ‘love.’ So expose your whole life—there’s no doubt you’ll be able to write good lyrics, and that’s what you should push forward with."

— Max Matsuura's work strategy for Hamasaki.

In 1995, under Nippon Columbia, Hamasaki became part of a hip hop unit called Ayumi featuring Dohzi-T and DJ Bass. Magazines touted Hamasaki as "the youngest female Japanese hip-hop rapper ever." The group released a mini-album called Nothing from Nothing in December of the same year, and did not chart at all, which led to Nippon Columbia ultimately dropping the group. After starring in a handful of poorly-reviewed films and doramas, Hamasaki then resigned herself to shopping in Tokyo with her friends. Her mother moved up to Tokyo around that time, and Hamasaki was once again living with her mother.

One of Hamasaki's friends knew the founder of the club Velfarre, Avex Trax executive Max Matsuura. Hamasaki was introduced to him at the club one night when she was in her teens. After hearing Hamasaki sing karaoke, Matsuura told her that she was not a very good singer, but has a good voice, and told her to take singing lessons. In the summer of 1997, Hamasaki was sent to New York City for vocal lessons under Mayumi Harada, a voice coach who had also trained superstars Namie Amuro, Hitomi, and Kaori Mochida before. Hamasaki enjoyed the freedom she experienced in New York; during her time there, Hamasaki wrote letters back to Matsuura in Japan, which convinced him to tell her to try writing songs for herself.

According to the book M Aisubeki Hito ga Ite, at the end of 1997, it was decided that Hamasaki would make her CD debut the following spring. Matsuura initially intended to form a group of three or four people and have Hamasaki as the vocalist; she refused, and ended up making her solo debut. Hamasaki herself wrote the lyrics for her debut song, and Matsuura was surprised at how well-written they were when she showed the lyrics to him. However, when she debuted, many people disliked her for her sweet way of speaking, saying that she sounded "stupid." Matsuura also suggested that she should change the way she called herself "Ayu" to "watashi"; however, he told her the strategy to "just be herself" and let her carry on as she was. Hamasaki's singles in 1998 never charted outstandingly well, but they sold well enough, and Hamasaki continued work at a furious pace, writing her own lyrics for every song on her debut. In an interview about the album's production, Hamasaki commented;

The songs were sorta chosen by the producers. From a group of dozens of possible songs, the producers chose some, and I would narrow it down to the ones I wanted to do. Since the producers wanted to choose the tracks based on their lyrics, they left that to me. When I was done choosing them, the music flowed in such a way that it told a story about going from the present to the future.

== Writing and composition ==
“Having him there made it much easier to sing. He’s known me for years. The reason I wanted to sing, the reason I wanted to write lyrics, and the fact that I could do both—it’s all because Max Matsuura encouraged me: 'Ayu can sing,' 'Ayu can write lyrics,' 'You can do it.' That made me believe 'I can do it.' He was the first person to ever say 'You can do it' to me. Back in junior high and high school, adults around me were more like, 'You can’t do anything, so don’t bother.' I was that type. So the fact that I could change is thanks to his encouragement. When he’s there during recording—even if he’s asleep or doesn’t say a word—I feel like I can do it, and it gives me strength.”

— Hamasaki on the album's recording process.

A Song for ×× was produced by Japanese musician and businessman Max Matsuura. For the album, Hamasaki's record label Avex Trax hired several Japanese musicians, Yasuhiko Hoshino, Mitsuru Igarashi, Kazuhito Kikuchi, among others to work on the album. A Song for ×× is primarily a pop rock record with influences of rock ballads. The album was recorded in several recording studios across Tokyo and Los Angeles throughout 1998. The final product was mastered by Eddy Schreyer at Oasis Mastering, Studio City. A Song for ×× is based on the concept of the flow of Hamasaki's own time (from childhood to the present to the future), which is clearly expressed in the lyrics.

"Prologue" is an instrumental that lasts for one minute and 25 seconds. "A Song for ××," the album's titular song, is a meaningful song that was named to avoid giving a fixed impression. The lyrics for "A Song for ××" were written by Hamasaki when she was looking back on her childhood, and the themes are the doubts, anxieties, and feelings that she had at that time; this song can be seen as a rebellion against her mother, who she says never showed her any maternal behavior. "Hana" has an idol-like melody and a glamorous, showy arrangement; the lyrics depict the change from childhood to adulthood. The songs "Friend" and "Friend II" are connected like a first and second part. "Friend" was recorded before her debut song "Poker Face," so it was the first time for Hamasaki to do everything. "Poker Face" has the "catchy" sound of standard pop songs.

"Wishing" is a ballad tune with an acoustic guitar rhythm. "You" is a standard pop song. During the recording process for "You," Hamasaki was ill, and it was very difficult to record the vocals. "As If..." is a medium-tempo pop tune with an intro piano solo that expresses the fragile feelings of a young girl; the song is about the feelings of a girl at a delicate stage when she is trying to reach adulthood but still cannot let go of her childhood. "Powder Snow" is a mid-tempo tune with lyrics that appeal to sorrow and carries a simple AOR-style melody. Hamasaki wrote "Powder Snow" in an attempt to break her image of writing energetic and positive songs; so she wanted to convey that she does not think being positive is a good thing and that being negative is bad or uncool, as well as that it is necessary to think and worry by yourself sometimes.

"Trust" is a light pop song with a "gentle" and "calming" melody. "Trust," which is alleged to have been dedicated to producer Matsuura, at first glance seems like a song for a lover, however, Hamasaki mentions the red thread of fate in the song for Matsuura. "Depend on You" blends Naoki Hayashibe's guitar and Akihiko Homma's keyboards. "Signal" is a dance pop tune that makes use of a sense of urgency and speed through a surging arrangement; the song is filled with Hamasaki's strong desire to keep moving forward. "From Your Letter" is an R&B-influenced slow-jam. "For My Dear..." is a power ballad that has lyrics and a melody expressing her fleeting feelings of being torn between her beliefs and loneliness. The album's closing track, "Present," is a way of expressing her gratitude to her fans. During the developmental process for A Song for ×× there was talk of making "Present" a secret track.

== Release and packaging ==
A Song for ×× was released in Japan and Greater China on January 1, 1999, through Avex Trax and the China Record Corporation. It was originally scheduled to be released on December 26, 1998, but was postponed and released on January 1 of the following year; however, it was actually in stores from December 26, 1998. The album included the sixteen tracks and was issued in a slightly oversized jewel case to accommodate the thickness of the booklet. The album artwork, which was photographed by Toru Kumazawa, is a monochromatic close up of Hamasaki's face while wearing a white winter coat. During an interview with Japanese magazine Beatfreak in January 1999, Hamasaki explained the album title in full detail;

The "A" in "A Song for XX" is both the "A" in Album, and the "A" in Ayu. As for the "XX," listeners can insert their favorite thing, the name of a person they care about, something like that. All that matters is that listeners imagine something there. Inside Ayu, there is only one meaning applied to the "XX." But, since everyone who listens will have different ideas as to who that song is about, I didn't want to limit the definition of "××" by specifying its meaning to me, so listeners can themselves attach a meaning to it easily.

== Singles ==
Hamasaki released her major-label debut single "Poker Face" on April 8, 1998. It became Hamasaki's first single to chart, peaking at number twenty on the Oricon Singles Chart. The following single, "You," was released on June 10, 1998. It also peaked at number twenty on the weekly singles chart. "Trust" was released as the album's third single on August 5, 1998. It peaked at number nine in Japan, becoming Hamasaki's first single to crack the top ten. "Trust" also became her first single to receive a Gold certification from the Recording Industry Association of Japan (RIAJ) for selling over 100,000 copies in the region.

The album's fourth single, "For My Dear...," was released on October 7, 1998. It became her second consecutive single to peak at number nine in Japan. The final single to be released from A Song for ×× was "Depend on You" on December 9, 1998. It became her highest-charting single to that point, peaking at number six, and received a Gold certification from the RIAJ.

== Reception ==
Professional ratings
Review scores
Source	Rating
AllMusic	3.5/5 stars
MTV Asia	8/10
CDJournal	(negative)

A Song for ×× received mixed-to-positive reviews from music critics. Neil Z. Yeung of AllMusic gave the album three and a half stars out of five, praising the compositions and Hamasaki's potential in the tracks. At the end of the review he stated: "The innocence and tentative confidence of a budding artist are still present on these tracks – something that would give way months later on her bold breakthrough Loveppears – making A Song for XX a crucial entry point that hinted at exciting things to come." Wang Yng of MTV Asia awarded the album a score of eight out of ten, stating: "Great songs and Hamasaki's capable singing make this album a good buy. And it's no wonder that she is being touted by music critics as one of the more prominent J-pop singers to watch out for in the near future."

The Village Voice member Barry Walters scathingly described the pop rock sound in A Song for ×× as "cautious" and "unassuming." A reviewer from CDJournal commented: "Her appeal can be summed up in one word: the transience that comes through in her songs, even if they feel a little childish. Her first album, packed with hits, is sure to sell like hot cakes, but whether listeners find her transience endearing or annoying is up to them."

Commercially, A Song for ×× became a success. Despite previous single sales of around 100,000 copies, Hamasaki's debut album achieved first week sales of 548,210 copies and debuted at number one. It topped the Oricon Albums Chart for five noncensecutive weeks, a remarkable feat for a debut album. Its high first week sales were partly due to its debut sales being the first and second week sales combined (Oricon only has 51 weeks instead of 52). By the end of 1999, the album was ranked at number 16 on the Oricon Yearly Albums Chart with 1,408,930 copies sold. The album stayed in the top ten for eight consecutive weeks, and in the Oricon Top 300 chart for 62 weeks. The Recording Industry Association of Japan (RIAJ) certified the album Million for selling over one million copies in Japan. (Note: Initially received a 3× Platinum certification for 1,200,000 copies, however the 3× Platinum threshold was redefined as 750,000 copies in 2003.) A Song for ×× is Hamasaki's sixth best-selling album based on Oricon Style's database. To date, it has sold over 1.452 million copies, making it the 143rd best-selling album of all time in the country. It is also the 94th best-selling album in Japan in the 1990s decade.

== Promotion ==
The song "Poker Face" was used as the opening theme of a Japanese TV show called Count Down TV. "You" was used as the commercial song for Chiba Vision Focus Dailies, as well as the ending theme for TV Tokyo's Asayan. "Trust" was used as the commercial song for Kao Corporation's "Sofina Au Bleu Jufilia." "For My Dear" was used as the commercial song for Morinaga & Co. "Meringue Chocolat." "Depend on You" was the ending theme for TBS' Count Down TV in December 1998, as well as the theme song for the Atlus PlayStation game Thousand Arms. The non-single tracks "A Song for ××" and "Hana" were used as radio singles to promote the album.

Hamasaki appeared at an event for her first album A Song for ×× in front of Shibuya 109 on December 26, 1998. On December 28, 1998, Hamasaki appeared as a guest personality on Nippon Broadcasting System's radio program All Night Nippon, competing against Tomomi Kahara, who was then produced by Tetsuya Komuro and had great success as his girlfriend. Since her debut as a singer, she has dared to present a contrasting character, singing songs about loneliness in a high-pitched voice and showing a foolish side to her personality, which became a hot topic among high school girls, but many of them said she looked very similar to Kahara. So, she turned this strategy around and, before the show aired, launched the catchphrase "Ayumi Hamasaki is not stupid," and aired promotional material on television. During the show, people who disliked Hamasaki called in to talk to her, but she made them sympathize with her and make them cry, and the response was so great that the message board on her official website was jammed the next day.

Several tracks from A Song for ×× were featured on remix albums during 1999 and 2000. The first was Ayu-mi-x on May 17, 1999. The second was her February 2000 Eurobeat compilation Super Eurobeat Presents Ayu-ro Mix. Hamasaki then performed several tracks from A Song for ×× on concert tours, including Ayumi Hamasaki Concert Tour 2000 Vol. 1 and Ayumi Hamasaki Concert Tour 2000 Vol. 2. The music videos to "Poker Face," "You," "Trust," "For My Dear...," "Depend on You" and other album promotional footage were featured on her 2004 video box set Ayumi Hamasaki Complete Clip Box A.

== Track listing ==
All lyrics are written by Ayumi Hamasaki.

CD
No.	Title	Music	Arranger(s)	Length
1.	"Prologue" (Instrumental)	Yasuhiko Hoshino	Hoshino	1:25
2.	"A Song for ××"	Hoshino	Hoshino	4:44
3.	"Hana"	Hoshino	Hoshino	4:07
4.	"Friend"	Hoshino	Akimitsu Honma	4:11
5.	"Friend II"	Mitsuru Igarashi	Igarashi	3:59
6.	"Poker Face"	Hoshino	Honma	4:41
7.	"Wishing"	Hideaki Kuwabara	Honma	4:29
8.	"You"	Hoshino	Honma	4:46
9.	"As If..."	Kazuhito Kikuchi	Honma	5:36
10.	"Powder Snow"	Kuwabara	Honma	5:27
11.	"Trust"	Takashi Kimura	Honma, Kimura	4:48
12.	"Depend on You"	Kikuchi	Honma, Takashi Morio	4:20
13.	"Signal"	Kuwabara	Honma	4:25
14.	"From Your Letter"	Akio Togashi	Togashi	4:38
15.	"For My Dear..."	Hoshino	Hoshino	4:33
16.	"Present"	Hoshino	Hoshino	4:31

== Charts ==
=== Weekly charts ===
Chart (1999)	Peak position
Japanese Albums (Oricon)	1
Taiwan International Albums (IFPI)	6

=== Year-end charts ===
Chart (1999)	Peak position
Japanese Albums (Oricon)	16

=== Decade-end charts ===
Chart (1990–1999)	Position
Japanese Albums (Oricon)	94

=== All-time chart ===
Chart	Position
Japanese Albums (Oricon)	143

== Certification and sales ==
Region	Certification	Certified units/sales
Japan (RIAJ)	Million	1,451,910

== Release history ==
Region	Date	Format	Catalogue number
Japan	January 1, 1999	CD	AVCD-11691
Taiwan	January 1, 1999	CD	AVJCD-10008
Hong Kong	June 1999	CD	AVTCD-95224
China	1999	CD	AVTCD-95224CB: SCD-822
