= A Classical =

Compilation album by Ayumi Hamasaki
- Released: January 8, 2013
- Recorded: 2000–2012 (vocals), 2012 (instrumentals)
- Genre: Classical
- Label: Avex Trax

Ayumi Hamasaki chronology
Again (2012)	A Classical (2013)	Love Again (2013)

A Classical (stylized as Classical) is an orchestral compilation album by Ayumi Hamasaki, released January 8, 2013 by Avex Trax. The album consists of classical arrangements of her past works, rearranged by Kousuke Yamashita. It was released on January 8, 2013.

The album was the third of five releases by Hamasaki in commemoration of the fifteenth anniversary of her music career. Its cover is a hand-drawn illustration of Hamasaki's Love EP cover made by a fan from Pixiv and Kaikai Kiki. No singles or new tracks were released to promote A Classical.

A Classical entered the Oricon album chart at number one with first-week sales of over 25,000 copies, becoming the first classical album to do so; however, it went on to sell only 30,000 copies in Japan.

== 15th Anniversary ==
A Classical is the third of five releases by Hamasaki in celebration of her 15th anniversary in music industry. It contains 10 rearranged tracks, out of which 7 were chosen by Team Ayu members in November 2012.

== Track listing ==
All lyrics are written by Ayumi Hamasaki.

No.	Title	Music	Original version from the album	Length
1.	"M"	Ayumi Hamasaki	I Am...	4:27
2.	"Love Song"	Tetsuya Komuro	Love Songs	4:17
3.	"Seasons"	D.A.I	Duty	4:15
4.	"You & Me"	Tetsuya Komuro	A Summer Best / Love Again	5:27
5.	"Blue Bird"	D.A.I	Secret	4:24
6.	"Days"	Kunio Tago	Next Level	5:07
7.	"Voyage"	Ayumi Hamasaki + D.A.I	Rainbow	5:08
8.	"Song 4 U"	HINATAspring, Yuta Nakano	Love / Love Again	3:48
9.	"Missing"	Kazuhiro Hara	Love / Love Again	4:58
10.	"Dearest"	Ayumi Hamasaki, D.A.I	I Am...	5:26

== Oricon sales chart ==
Release	Chart	Peak position	First week sales	Sales total
January 8, 2013	Oricon Daily Albums Chart	1	10,825	33,017
January 8, 2013	Oricon Weekly Albums Chart	1	25,049	33,017
January 8, 2013	Oricon Monthly Albums Chart	20	31,099	33,017
