= Love Again (Ayumi Hamasaki album) =

Studio album by Ayumi Hamasaki
- Released: February 8, 2013
- Recorded: 2012
- Genres: J-pop; dance-pop; pop rock
- Label: Avex Trax
- Producer: Max Matsuura

Ayumi Hamasaki chronology
| A Classical (2013) | Love Again (2013) | Colours (2014) |

Singles from Love Again
- 1. "Love EP" Released: November 8, 2012; 2. "Again EP" Released: December 8, 2012

Professional ratings
Review scores
| Source | Rating |
|---|---|
| AllMusic | 3/5 stars |

Love Again (stylized as LOVE again) is the fourteenth full-length studio album released by Japanese singer Ayumi Hamasaki. Stylistically, the album is a return to the aesthetic of Hamasaki's twelfth album, Love Songs. It was released in Japan on February 8, 2013, in six physical versions: CD Only, CD+DVD, CD+Blu-ray, Playbutton, CD+DVD+Goods, and CD+Blu-ray+Goods.

Love again debuted atop the Oricon charts with first week sales of 56,348 copies, eventually reaching total sales of 88,825 copies by the end of its chart run. The album was certified gold by the Recording Industry Association of Japan for shipments of over 100,000 copies, becoming Hamasaki's last album to do so.

== 15th anniversary ==
Love Again is the fourth of five releases released to celebrate the fifteenth year of Hamasaki's signing to her record label, Avex. Instead of singles, Hamasaki released two mini-albums Love and Again (the first and second installments of her fifteenth anniversary releases). All original tracks from Love and Again are included on the album, as well as "You & Me", a new track from A Summer Best. The album sold 56,348 copies by the end of the first week in Japan.

== Track listing ==
All lyrics are written by Ayumi Hamasaki.

CD
| No. | Title | Music | Arranger(s) | Length |
|---|---|---|---|---|
| 1. | "Wake Me Up" | Philippe-Marc Anquetil, Hiten Bharadia, Bardur Haberg | Tasuku | 4:02 |
| 2. | "Song 4 U" | Hinata Spring, Yuta Nakano | Yuta Nakano | 3:50 |
| 3. | "Missing" | Kazuhiro Hara | Yuta Nakano | 4:57 |
| 4. | "Sakura" | Kunio Tago | Yuta Nakano | 4:33 |
| 5. | "Melody" | Yasuhiko Hoshino | Yuta Nakano | 5:25 |
| 6. | "Task'n'Bass" (instrumental) | Tasuku | Tasuku | 1:57 |
| 7. | "Bye-Bye Darling" | Yasuhiko Hoshino | Tasuku | 4:02 |
| 8. | "Snowy Kiss" | Tetsuya Komuro | Tasuku | 6:07 |
| 9. | "Sweet Scar" | D.A.I. | Yuta Nakano | 4:12 |
| 10. | "Petal" | Kunio Tago | Yuta Nakano | 4:10 |
| 11. | "Glasses" (instrumental) | Yuta Nakano | Yuta Nakano | 1:45 |
| 12. | "Untitled For Her ... Story 2" | Yuta Nakano | Yuta Nakano | 5:22 |
| 13. | "Gloria" | Yasuhiko Hoshino | Yuta Nakano | 4:38 |
| 14. | "Ivy" | Tetsuya Komuro | Yuta Nakano | 4:39 |
| 15. | "You & Me" | Tetsuya Komuro | Tasuku | 5:37 |

DVD/Blu-ray
| No. | Title | Length |
|---|---|---|
| 1. | "Song 4 U" (Video Clip) |
| 2. | "Missing" (Video Clip) |
| 3. | "Wake Me Up" (Video Clip) |
| 4. | "You & Me" (Video Clip) |
| 5. | "Snowy Kiss" (Video Clip) |
| 6. | "Sweet Scar" (Video Clip) |
| 7. | "Melody" (Video Clip) |
| 8. | "Song 4 U" (Making Clip) |
| 9. | "Missing" (Making Clip) |
| 10. | "You & Me" (Making Clip) |
| 11. | "Wake Me Up/Snowy Kiss" (Making Clip #1) |
| 12. | "Wake Me Up/Snowy Kiss" (Making Clip #2) |
| 13. | "Sweet Scar" (Making Clip) |
| 14. | "Melody" (Making Clip) |

== Charts and certifications ==
| Chart | Peak position | Debut sales | Total sales |
|---|---|---|---|
| Oricon Daily Chart | 1 | 28,016 | 110,000 (14 weeks) |
| Oricon Weekly Chart | 1 | 56,348 | 110,000 (14 weeks) |

=== Year-end charts ===
| Chart (2013) | Position |
|---|---|
| Oricon year-end albums | 70 |

=== Certifications ===
| Country | Provider | Certification |
|---|---|---|
| Japan | RIAJ | Gold |
