= Cyber Trance Presents Ayu Trance 2 =

Remix album by Ayumi Hamasaki

Remix album by Ayumi Hamasaki
- Released: September 26, 2002
- Genre: Trance
- Length: 66:17
- Label: Avex Trax

Ayumi Hamasaki chronology
Ayu-mi-x 4 + Selection Acoustic Orchestra Version (2002)	Cyber Trance Presents Ayu Trance 2 (2002)	RMX Works from Ayu-mi-x 5 Non-Stop Mega Mix (2003)

Cyber Trance Presents Ayu Trance 2 is a remix album by Japanese recording artist Ayumi Hamasaki. It was released the same day as Hamasaki's 28th single "Voyage".

== Information ==
The album is a sequel of Cyber Trance Presents Ayu Trance, and the songs of the album are in non-stop format. Half of the songs had been previously unreleased at the time of the release of the album, and it premiered remixes from the album I am... and from the then-unreleased album Rainbow. The other half were songs had been included in the first Ayu Trance album, like the remixes of Above & Beyond, Armin van Buuren, Push and Voodoo & Serano.

The versions used in this album were club/extended versions. Remix versions of "Free & Easy", "I am..." and "Daybreak" have been only included in this album. The radio edit versions of remixes of "Independent", "Hanabi", "July 1st" were later included in Ayu Trance. However, with the exception of the extended club version of the Lange remix of "Hanabi" -which was released only through promotional vinyls at the time of this album's release- all other original extended versions of these remixes remain unreleased.

On November 17, 2021, the album was rereleased as Cyber Trance Presents Ayu Trance 2 -COMPLETE EDITION- on music streaming services to celebrate the 20th anniversary of its release. This edition contains previously unreleased remix versions.

== Track listings ==
=== 2002 version ===
1. Independent (D-Nation Remix)
2. Hanabi (Lange Remix)
3. M (Above & Beyond Typhoon Dub - Vocal Mix)
4. July 1 (Flip & Fill Remix)
5. Dearest (Rank 1 Remix)
6. Free & Easy (Minimalistix Remix)
7. Unite! (Airwave Club Mix)
8. Connected (Ferry Corsten - System F Mix)
9. Fly High (VooDoo & Serano Extended Mix)
10. Audience (Darren Tate 12" Mix)
11. Trauma (JamX & De Leon's DuMonde Dub - Vocal Mix)
12. Boys & Girls (Push 12" Mix)
13. I am ... (Ramon Zenker Remix)
14. Appears (Armin van Buuren Sunset Dub - Vocal Mix)
15. Depend on You (Svenson & Gielen Club Mix)
16. Daybreak (Orion Too Remix)

=== 2021 version ===
1. Independent (D-Nation Remix)
2. Hanabi (Lange Remix)
3. July 1 (Flip & Fill Remix)
4. Dearest (Rank 1 Remix)
5. Free & Easy (Minimalistix Remix)
6. Connected (Ferry Corsten Remix)
7. Connected (Push Remix)
8. I am ... (Ramon Zenker Remix)
9. Daybreak (Orion Too Remix)

== Charts ==
Chart (2002)	Peak position
Japan Oricon Albums Chart	3

- Total sales: 237,800 (Japan)
