= Progress (song) =

Promotional single by Ayumi Hamasaki

from the album Five
- Language: Japanese
- Released: August 31, 2011
- Recorded: 2011
- Genre: Pop, rock
- Length: 5:06
- Label: Avex Trax
- Songwriters: Ayumi Hamasaki; Yuta Nakano
- Producers: Yuta Nakano; Max Matsuura

"Progress" is a song by Japanese musician Ayumi Hamasaki. It was one of the promotional tracks from her third extended play Five, released on August 31, 2011. The song was used as the theme song for the PlayStation 3 role-playing game Tales of Xillia, the thirteenth main entry in the Tales series. The song was a commercial success, certified gold by the RIAJ.

== Background ==
In 2007, Hamasaki began to collaborate with musician Yuta Nakano, on the song "Talkin' 2 Myself" and its B-side "Decision". Nakano composed four songs on her album Guilty (2008), including on the song "Mirror", which was remade as the single "Mirrorcle World". Nakano continued to collaborate with Hamasaki, creating four songs for Next Level (2009), four songs for Rock 'n' Roll Circus (2010), and arranging the majority of her 12th studio album Love Songs, an album that centred on collaborations with veteran music producer Tetsuya Komuro.

The song's involvement with Tales of Xillia was first announced in May 2011. Hamasaki had not often written music for games in her career, however previously written two songs for the game Onimusha: Dawn of Dreams in 2006, her single "Startin'" and her song "Rainy Day" from the album (Miss)understood (2006). In July 2011, Hamasaki's third extended play Five was announced to be released on August 31, featuring five songs with music videos and commercial tie-ups.

In November 2012, a sequel to the game was produced, entitled Tales of Xillia 2. Hamasaki returned to perform the theme song for this game as well: "Song 4 U", which was featured on her extended play Love (2012).

== Writing and production ==
The song featured words written by Hamasaki, with music and arrangement handled by producer Yuta Nakano.

== Promotion and release ==
The song's involvement with Tales of Xillia was first announced in May 2011. As the theme song, the song played an integral part of advertising for the game, and played during the opening sequence for the game.

Hamasaki performed the song on her Power of Music 2011 A tour, held from May to October 2011. At the 62nd NHK Kōhaku Uta Gassen held on December 31, 2011, Hamasaki attended, performing "Progress" live. She performed the song also during her COUNTDOWN LIVE 2014 - 2015 A Cirque de Minuit, and her ARENA TOUR 2015 A Cirque de Minuit.

== Music video ==
A music video was produced for the song, directed by Masashi Muto. It features Hamasaki performing the song in profile against a white background, interspersed with sped up footage of a journey through a city. The camera travels through streets, subway stations and hallways, occasionally slowing to focus on a bystander. While the scenes begin in Tokyo, mid way the view changes to the Japanese countryside, followed by American beach and desert footage. The final bystander the camera view stops at is Hamasaki herself.

== Critical reception ==
Critics were very positive about the song's arrangement. CDJournal praised the song's "dramatic arrangement", noting the "solemn strings intro" which leads into the song's introduction backed by piano and next into a "hard, serious sound" centred on the guitar. Embrace Your Magazine reviewer Kai and Anime Revolution felt similarly, with both reviews noting how well the song's dramatic qualities were suited to Tales of Xillia.

== Charts and certifications ==
=== Charts ===
Chart (2011)	Peak position
Japan Billboard Japan Hot 100	41
Japan RIAJ Digital Track Chart	2

=== Certifications ===
Chart	Amount
RIAJ digital download certification	Gold (100,000)

== Personnel ==
Personnel details were sourced from Five's liner notes booklet.

Musicians and personnel

- Ryota Akizuki – additional guitar
- Ayumi Hamasaki – lyrics, vocals
- Yuko Kajitani – additional violin
- Suzie Katayama & The Strings – strings
- Chiharu Mikuzuki – bass
- Yuta Nakano – arrangement, music, programming, strings arrangement
- David Reitzas – mixing
- Phil X – guitar
- Tom Tamada – additional drums

== Release history ==
Region	Date	Format	Distributing Label
Japan	August 24, 2011	Ringtone	Avex Trax
Japan	August 31, 2011	Digital download	Avex Trax
