= You & Me (Ayumi Hamasaki song) =

- Remix versions' digital download cover

Promotional single by Ayumi Hamasaki

from the album A Summer Best, Love Again
- Language: Japanese
- Released: August 8, 2012
- Recorded: 2011
- Genre: Pop, dance
- Length: 5:36
- Label: Avex Trax
- Songwriters: Ayumi Hamasaki; Tetsuya Komuro
- Producers: Tasuku; Max Matsuura

Official Music Video
- You & Me on YouTube

"You & Me" is a song by Japanese musician Ayumi Hamasaki. It was the leading promotional track from her summer song compilation album A Summer Best, released on August 8, 2012. The song was a commercial success, certified gold by the RIAJ, and became a part of the track list for Hamasaki's 14th studio album, Love Again (2013).

== Background ==
In March 2012, Hamasaki released her 13th studio album Party Queen, led by the song "How Beautiful You Are", a song used as the drama Saigo Kara Nibanme no Koi's theme song.

Hamasaki first recorded a song of Tetsuya Komuro's in 2001, the duet "A Song Is Born" with Komuro's wife Keiko of the band Globe. In 2006, she recorded a cover of the TRF song "Teens" for their album Lif-e-Motions. In 2010, Hamasaki released Love Songs, an album featuring 10 songs produced by Komuro, including the singles "Crossroad", "Virgin Road", "Last Angel" and the eponymous track "Love Song". In late 2011, Hamasaki covered the TRF song "Happening Here", which she performed in December 2011 at her Countdown Live 2011-2012: Hotel Love Songs concerts. The song was included on A Summer Best alongside "You & Me".

== Writing and production ==
The song featured words written by Hamasaki, and music by Japanese music producer Tetsuya Komuro. Long time Hamasaki collaborator Tasuku handled the song's arrangement.

== Promotion and release ==
The song was used in commercials for Japanese company Nissen, fur autumn and winter 2012. The a cappella tracks for the song were released for free on August 14 to SoundCloud, and on September 13, remixes of the song by Remo-con and Shinichi Osawa were released as digital downloads. This was the third time Hamasaki had been remixed by Osawa, after "Startin' (Shinichi Osawa Remix)" from Ayu-mi-x 6: Gold (2008) and "Appears (Shinichi Osawa Remix)" from Ayu-mi-x 7 Version House (2011). DJ Remo-con is the stage name of producer Tetsuya Tamura, who had been producing remixes for Hamasaki since 2001. These two "You & Me" remixes were compiled on CD as a part of Hamasaki's fourth extended play, Love, which was released on November 8, 2012.

The song was first added to her set-list for her Arena Tour 2012 A: Hotel Love Songs tour on July 22, at her performance at the Osaka-jō Hall, and continued to be a part of the set-list until September. The song was also performed at festivals in 2012: first performed on August 8, 2012 at the FNS Uta no Natsu Matsuri, a four-hour Fuji Television music special. The song became a part of her set-lists for Countdown Live 2012–2013, 15th Anniversary Tour: A Best Live (April–July 2013), Countdown Live 2013–2014 and Premium Showcase: Feel the Love (May–July 2014), and has been performed at A-Nation from 2012–2014.

== Music video ==
A music video was produced for the song, directed by Masashi Muto. It features Hamasaki at a beach resort town, alongside her dancer Maroka "Maro" Uchiyama. Scenes feature Uchiyama and Hamasaki at the ocean, the pair playing games at a night carnival, and driving to a supermarket.

== Critical reception ==
CDJournal called "You & Me" an impressive upper tempo song with a "danceable groove tune" and a "piercing bright melody", and praised the final "quiet" section of the song in particular. They noted it was one of the highlights of the A Summer Best compilation.

== Versions ==
- "You & Me" (5:36)
- "You & Me" (from A Classical) (5:27)
- "You & Me (Remo-con rmx – radio edit)" (5:36)
- "You & Me (Remo-con rmx – extended)" (7:29)
- "You & Me (Remo-con rmx – instrumental)" (7:29)
- "You & Me (Shinichi Osawa remix)" (4:56)
- "You & Me (Shinichi Osawa remix instrumental)" (4:56)

== Charts ==
Chart (2012)	Peak position
Japan Billboard Adult Alternative Airplay	83
Japan Billboard Japan Hot 100	33

== Certifications ==
Chart	Amount
RIAJ digital download certification	Gold (100,000)

== Personnel ==
Personnel details were sourced from A Summer Best's liner notes booklet.

Musicians and personnel

- Ayumi Hamasaki – lyrics, vocals, music video cast
- Yumi Kawamura – additional background vocal
- Shingo Kobayashi – acoustic piano
- Tetsuya Komuro – music
- Masashi Muto – music video director
- Yuichi Nagayama – recordist
- Tasuku – arrangement, guitar, programming
- Maroka 'Maro' Uchiyama – music video cast
- Jerry K. White – music video location support
- Naoki Yamada – mixing
- Yujiro Yonetsu – 2nd engineer

== Release history ==
Region	Date	Format	Distributing Label
Japan	August 8, 2012	Ringtone, digital download	Avex Trax
Japan	September 21, 2012	Digital download ("Remo-con rmx - Extended", "Shinichi Osawa Remix")	Avex Trax
