= A Summer Best =

Compilation album by Ayumi Hamasaki
- Released: August 8, 2012
- Recorded: 1998–2012
- Genres: Pop; rock; electronica; synthpop
- Label: Avex Trax
- Producers: Ayumi Hamasaki; Max Matsuura

Ayumi Hamasaki chronology
Party Queen (2012)	A Summer Best (2012)	Love (2012)

Singles from A Summer Best
- 1. "Happening Here" Released: December 21, 2011; 2. "You & Me" Released: August 8, 2012

A Summer Best (stylized as '''''SUMMER BEST) is the 6th compilation album by Japanese singer-songwriter Ayumi Hamasaki released on August 8, 2012. The album contains 24 old songs plus two new tracks - "You & Me" and "Happening Here" - over 2 discs. The album is available in two versions: 2CD and 2CD+DVD.

It is her second compilation album (after A BEST 2 ~BLACK~) to not peak at number one on the Oricon chart.

== Track listing ==
All lyrics are written by Ayumi Hamasaki except "Happening Here", which is written by Tetsuya Komuro and Takahiro Maeda.

CD1: (2CD)
No.	Title	Music	Arranger(s)	Length
1.	"Blue Bird"	D.A.I	HΛL	4:09
2.	"July 1st"	Ayumi Hamasaki, D.A.I (Note: Crea is the pseudonym of Ayumi Hamasaki.)	tasuku	4:22
3.	"Greatful Days"	Bounceback	HΛL	4:40
4.	"Glitter"	Kazuhiro Hara	HΛL	4:52
5.	"Sunrise ~ LOVE is ALL ~"	Hana Nishimura	CMJK	4:49
6.	"Audience"	D.A.I	HΛL	4:08
7.	"Independent"	Ayumi Hamasaki, D.A.I	tasuku	4:56
8.	"Evolution"	Ayumi Hamasaki	HΛL	4:43
9.	"Boys & Girls"	D.A.I	Naoto Suzuki, D.A.I	3:56
10.	"Unite!"	Ayumi Hamasaki	HΛL	5:01
11.	"Inspire"	Tetsuya Yukumi	HΛL	4:34
12.	"Next Level"	D.A.I	HΛL	4:33
13.	"Happening Here"	Tetsuya Komuro	CMJK	4:39

CD2: (2CD)
No.	Title	Music	Arranger(s)	Length
1.	"Hanabi"	Ayumi Hamasaki, D.A.I	CMJK	4:56
2.	"Hanabi ~ Episode II ~"	Ayumi Hamasaki, D.A.I	tasuku	4:56
3.	"Far Away"	Kazuhito Kikuchi, D.A.I	HΛL	5:36
4.	"Monochrome"	HΛL	Naoto Suzuki, D.A.I	4:32
5.	"Theme of A-Nation '03"	Ayumi Hamasaki, D.A.I	D.A.I, Hiroki Mizukami	6:15
6.	"Sunset ~ LOVE is ALL ~"	Hana Nishimura	Yuta Nakano	5:45
7.	"Seasons"	D.A.I	Naoto Suzuki	4:23
8.	"Another Song" (feat. Urata Naoya)	Yuta Nakano	Yuta Nakano	5:20
9.	"Fated"	Shintaro Hagiwara, Akihisa Matsuura	CMJK	5:34
10.	"Moon"	Yasuhiko Hoshino	Yuta Nakano	5:48
11.	"Blossom"	Yasuhiko Hoshino	Yuta Nakano	4:08
12.	"Fairyland"	tasuku	HΛL	5:20
13.	"You & Me"	Tetsuya Komuro	tasuku	5:37

DVD: 2CD+DVD
No.	Title	Length
1.	"Blue Bird" (Video clip)
2.	"July 1st" (Video clip)
3.	"Glitter" (Video clip)
4.	"Grateful Days" (Video clip)
5.	"Sunrise ~ LOVE is ALL ~" (Video clip)
6.	"Independent" (Video clip)
7.	"Boys & Girls" (Video clip)
8.	"Evolution" (Video clip)
9.	"Inspire" (Video clip)
10.	"Unite!" (Video clip)
11.	"Audience" (Video clip)
12.	"Next Level" (Video clip)
13.	"Hanabi" (Video clip)
14.	"Sunset ~ LOVE is ALL ~" (Video clip)
15.	"Monochrome" (Video clip)
16.	"Faiyland" (Video clip)
17.	"Fated" (Video clip)
18.	"Hanabi ~ Episode II ~" (Video clip)
19.	"Seasons" (Video clip)
20.	"Theme of A-Nation'03" (Video clip)
21.	"Blossom" (Video clip)
22.	"Moon" (Video clip)
23.	"Another Song" (Video clip)
24.	"Far Away" (Video clip)
25.	"You & Me" (Video clip)

== Charts ==
Oricon Sales Chart (Japan)

Release	Chart	Peak position	First week sales	Sales total	Chart run
August 8, 2012	Oricon Daily Albums Chart	2	31,803		
August 8, 2012	Oricon Weekly Albums Chart	2	83,363	210,000	14 weeks
August 8, 2012	Oricon Monthly Albums Chart	3	127,013		
August 8, 2012	Oricon Yearly Albums Chart	42	139,567		
