= Thousand Arms =

1998 video game

- Developer: TOSE (Note: Planning and supervision by Red Company.)
- Publisher: Atlus
- Director: Hiroyuki Hataike
- Producer: Makoto Sugiura
- Artist: Yūya Kusaka
- Writer: Junki Takegami
- Platform: PlayStation
- Release: JP: December 17, 1998; NA: October 14, 1999
- Genre: Role-playing video game
- Mode: Single-player

Thousand Arms (Note: Japanese: サウザンドアームズ, Hepburn: Sauzando Āmuzu) is a cross-genre video game developed by TOSE and published by Atlus for the PlayStation in 1998. The game mixes elements of Japanese role-playing video games and dating sim video games.

== Synopsis ==
=== Plot ===
The game takes place on a "steampunk" type of world. The Dark Acolytes, a mysterious organization of cyborgs and robots, is trying to find the five legendary Sacred Flames, and bring chaos to the World in the process. Meis, a womanizing "Spirit Blacksmith" with the ability to make magical weapons, finds himself chosen to find the flames before the Dark Acolytes do. However, to increase the power of his weapons, Meis must have the help of a woman, and must increase his 'intimacy level' with her by going out on dates. Along his journey, he meets a colorful cast of characters, including girls to date and allies to join his party.

=== Characters ===
==== Playable ====
Meis Triumph

The 16-year-old heir to a family of Spirit Blacksmiths, Meis learned from his father how to be a womanizer. Stubborn and lazy, Meis is forced to change his ways against his will, first when the Dark Acolytes force him to leave his comfortable home, and then when the spirits of the Ancient Blacksmiths give him the mission of finding the sacred flames. He is attracted to Sodina, but can't resist hitting on other beautiful women.
In addition to his ability to reforge weapons to increase their power and grant them magical spells or special attacks, Meis can obtain "Elemental Beasts" to use in combat, similar to the "summons" seen in the Final Fantasy games. His weapon is a sword.

Sodina Dawnfried

The younger sister of a great Spirit Blacksmith named Jyabil, Sodina is a beautiful, 15-year-old red-haired girl; however, she's also very brave. After her brother is killed by the Dark Acolytes, she decides to help Meis on his quest. She has feelings for Meis, but finds herself often enraged by his lecherous behaviour. Her weapon of choice is a dagger.

Muza Grifford

A 21-year-old knight and an old friend of Meis, he's brave but not too clever, and tends to freeze when in the presence of pretty girls. He has a very large physique. He later develops feelings for Wyna. His weapon of choice is a claymore, a huge sword that normal people would have a difficult time wielding.

Wyna Grapple

The 17-year-old daughter of the King of the Pirates, Wyna is a boisterous girl who loves fighting; she joins the party just to go on adventures. She wears a bikini as well as an eyepatch, but just for effect, she's not missing any eyes. If you pay attention during dates, you'll see that Wyna's eyepatch changes eyes from time to time. At first she's attracted to Meis because of his strength, but later returns Muza's feelings. Her weapon of choice is a large battle hammer.

Nelsha Stylus

A unique girl whose personality changes when she puts on new outfits, due to the spirits that inhabit them. Nelsha is a shy, 16-year-old nerdy-looking girl who refers to herself in the third person. She dreams of becoming a "Dress Master", a title given to the best clothes designers in the world (similar to Metalia's title of Jewel Master). Her weapon of choice is a magic sewing needle.
In addition, Nelsha can change her costumes in combat, which changes her form completely and gives her different powers.

Kyleen Nelphe

A 16-year-old green-haired female thief who tries to use the party for her own purposes, but ends up befriending and joining them. Her personality is cynical and sarcastic. She seems attracted to Soushi. Her weapon of choice is a rapier, a sword used for fencing.

Soushi Mahoroba

An 18-year-old samurai with a lot of pride, who considers himself a ladykiller as well. His most notable feature is his pink kimono (a garment not usually worn by males). He and Meis can't stand each other at first but eventually come to respect each other. His weapon is a katana called Masamune (a popular name given to katanas in RPGs, named after the blacksmith from feudal Japan).

==== Villains ====
The game's main antagonist is Medeus, The Dark Emperor. He is the ancient ruler of the Clan of Darkness. He transformed his body into a machine in order to live long enough to find the Holy Flames of the Light, which he believes will allow him to become a god. Schmidt, "The Dark Master", serves under him, along with Jeala, who serves him out of unrequited love. Below them are "The Evil Mecha Five" - five powerful cyborg servants of the Emperor, all named after machine parts or tools. Shaft, Bearing, Ratchet, Wire, and Bolt.

==== Meis' dates ====
In addition to the girls on his party, Meis can also date the following women:

Marion, a young inventor and Gadget Master with a childish personality. She lives in the giant train called Mounthand.

Palma Esterte, a priestess obsessed with cleanliness. She can be found in the huge ship called the Langoud.

Kyoka Maharoba, Soushi's sister, a shy and proper Japanese girl who detests her brother's lecherous personality (but is blind to Meis'). She can be found in the town of Boyzby.

Mil Wind, a highly intelligent girl who stalks Meis as a way to research his womanizing personality. She lives in Kant, Meis' hometown. Her name is a pun on "windmill".

Metalia, the "Jewel Master", the oldest of Meis' dates, over 200 years old as said by herself, this woman was a friend of Jyabil's and helps the heroes find the flames. Metalia can be found in the Myscatonia Library.

== Gameplay ==
=== Combat ===
Combat in Thousand Arms is turn based, with up to three party members to be taken into battle at once. However, only the front character is actually able to physically attack the enemy. The other two characters serve in a supporting role, taunting the enemy and utilizing certain items or spells. The enemies have the same limitations. If necessary, characters can be rotated out such that one of the support characters and the lead character exchange position. Since only one character can engage in direct combat with the enemy at a time, this tends to have the overall effect of slowing down combat when compared to games which allow all or most of the party to be fully involved.

=== Dating simulation ===
The key feature in this game which distinguishes it from most other RPGs is its built-in mini-dating simulation. Thousand Arms' dating sim features dating locations in many of its major cities and towns, and a cast of nine women. The dating aspect allows the player to pick dialogue choices. For example, one of Meis' dates asks what he thinks his best trait is during a passionate night out. The player has the choice of several responses, varying from "My eyebrows. I got them from my father." to "My hairy legs." Additionally, the dating occasionally breaks fourth wall, such as when the main character alludes to a night of sex with a female character during a date, she states that "the game isn't rated for that".

The dating aspect also has an actual in-game effect. By successfully wooing each female character, her intimacy level can be slowly raised. As this level rises, it grants her the ability to imbue weapons with increasingly powerful spells and skills. This magical forging, which is possible due to Meis' training as a Spirit Blacksmith, relies on the smith having established such positive female relationships.

To date a girl, the player must visit a statue of the Goddess of Love located on each town and choose from the list of currently available girls. He must then take her to a dating spot in the town. The date itself is a conversation where the player must choose from multiple answers to the girls' questions. Getting the wrong answers might actually decrease the intimacy level or end the date early. The Intimacy Level can also be raised or lowered with gifts, and the statues also allow the playing of optional minigames (each girl has a different one.)

=== Forging weapons ===
Meis can increase the power and abilities of the weapons of any member of his party. To do this, first he must collect invisible "spirits" which are hidden in various spots. Then he must access a forge; there's usually one on each town. Finally he must select a girl and choose which of the abilities that she can provide that he will give to a particular weapon. This uses up the collected spirits. Note that in addition to spells and power boosts, the girls can also grant special powers to certain weapons.

== Development ==
The game makes use of early CGI to provide limited 3D backgrounds. The character sprites are super deformed. More typical anime style pictures are used during conversations. Cutscenes are done in traditional animation.

The game's music was also released as a soundtrack, packaged alongside the game in some instance, or available for purchase by mail. The disc also included digital artwork, biographies, and character voice acting excerpts when explored on a personal computer. The soundtrack also contained J-pop musician Ayumi Hamasaki's fifth single Depend on You as its opening theme.

== Reception ==
Reception

Aggregate score
Aggregator	Score
GameRankings	77%

Review scores
Publication	Score
AllGame	3.5/5
CNET Gamecenter	5/10
Electronic Gaming Monthly	7/10 (Note: In Electronic Gaming Monthly's review of the game, two critics gave it each a score of 7/10, one gave it 7.5/10, and the other gave it 6.5/10.)
Famitsu	28/40
Game Informer	7.75/10
GameFan	(G.N.) 95% (MVS) 92% 90% (Note: In GameFan's viewpoint of the game, three critics gave it each a score of 93, 90, and 88.)
GameSpot	7.6/10
IGN	8.5/10
Next Generation	3/5
Official U.S. PlayStation Magazine	4/5
RPGamer	2.5/5
RPGFan	(Ken) 85/100 (Neal) 80/100

The game received favorable reviews according to the review aggregation website GameRankings. Jeff Lundrigan of NextGen said, "Well made if breezily consequential, Thousand Arms straddles the line between being an enjoyable time-waster and a thoroughly engrossing game – either way, you can't miss". In Japan, Famitsu gave it a score of 28 out of 40. Matt Van Stone of GameFan gave the game universal acclaim, over a month before it was released Stateside.

Christian Nutt of GameSpot likened it to the Sakura Taisen and Lunar series of video games, praising it for "...the combination of solid RPG questing, graphics, dialogue, dubbing, and ambiance really push this game over the edge from standard to special. Game-playing anime fans will get a big kick out of it, and it is the first real example of a decent dating simulation in the US. Any RPG fans who like amusing situations, animated (in both senses of the word) characters, and challenging gameplay will enjoy this title". Francesca Reyes of IGN said that the game "as a whole is a distinctly anime-type RPG, from its character designs to the visual style to the themes that it explores. Quirky, unique, inventive and charming, it may not be the RPG to speak to the masses, but it will definitely appeal to those immersed in the culture of import gaming and the already converted". Jason White of AllGame praised it for being "a lot of fun" and "probably one of the most unique RPG/Dating sims out there. There is a really rich story, cool animation and dating!", but conceded that there may not be the biggest audience for such a game, stating "While dating really makes this game a unique experience, it also has limited appeal to hardcore RPG fans. Unless you really want to date and figure out the whole female mystique while bashing in people's skulls, you won't enjoy this game. Too many of the things that hardcore RPG fans find fun are only available through dating and nothing else". E. Coli of GamePro said in one review, "Thousand Arms brings new elements to the genre, such as the weapon forging and the dating game, while keeping gamers busy with excellent puzzles, a huge world to explore, and tough battles galore. It will definitely make a fine addition to any RPG fan's collection". (Note: GamePro gave the game 4/5 for graphics, two 3.5 scores for sound and control, and 4.5/5 for fun factor in one review.) In another review, however, The Freshman called it "an RPG for someone looking for something different. If you're an anime fan, then you'll definitely want to give this game a shot. Hardcore RPGers might find that it lacks the depth they've come to expect, but others will fall in love with Thousand Arms' charm and humor". (Note: GamePro gave the game three 4/5 scores for graphics, sound, and fun factor, and 3.5/5 for control in another review.)
