= TBC Radio =

- Kingston; Jamaica
- Frequency: 88.5 MHz
- Branding: The Breath of Change

Programming
- Format: Christian radio

Ownership
- Owner: Tarrant Baptist Church

History
- First air date: 12 April 1998

Technical information
- ERP: 500 watts
- Transmitter coordinates: 18.0156°N 76.8079°W

Links
- Webcast: Live stream Listen live
- Website: tbcradio.org

TBC Radio is a Christian radio station in Kingston, Jamaica, broadcasting on 88.5 FM. It is owned by Tarrant Baptist Church.

TBC Radio airs a variety of Christian programs including programs that are locally produced and syndicated programs such as Focus on the Family, Back to the Bible, and Unshackled!, as well as the Children's program Adventures in Odyssey.
