= Nothing from Nothing (EP) =

EP by Ayumi Hamasaki featuring Dohzi-T and DJ Bass
- Released: December 1, 1995
- Genre: Hip hop
- Label: Nippon Columbia

Ayumi Hamasaki albums chronology
Nothing from Nothing (1995)	A Song for ×× (1999)

Singles from Nothing from Nothing
- 1. "Nothing from Nothing" Released: September 21, 1995

Nothing from Nothing was the first mini-album recorded by Ayumi Hamasaki, featuring Dohzi-T and DJ Bass and released on December 1, 1995. After the album failed to chart, her talent agency and record label, Nippon Columbia, dropped her. Musically, Nothing from Nothing is a hip hop album that features Hamasaki rapping on all of the tracks, except "Limit".

== Track listing ==
All lyrics are written by Dohzi-T except "Limit" (written by Ayumi Hamasaki); all music is composed by Kazuo Ishijima.

Single
No.	Title	Lyrics	Music	Length
1.	"Nothing from Nothing"	Dohzi–T	Kazuo Ishijima	6:09
2.	"Paper Doll"	Dohzi–T	Kazuo Ishijima	5:15
3.	"Nothing from Nothing" (Original Karaoke)			5:40

Album
No.	Title	Lyrics	Music	Length
1.	"Nothing from Nothing" (single version)	Dohzi–T	Kazuo Ishijima	6:09
2.	"Limit"	Ayumi Hamasaki	Kazuo Ishijima	6:38
3.	"Paper Doll"	Dohzi–T	Kazuo Ishijima	5:15
4.	"Gut it-pez"	Dohzi–T	Kazuo Ishijima	6:07
5.	"Nothing from Nothing" (album version)	Dohzi–T	Kazuo Ishijima	6:06

Bonus Track
No.	Title	Length
6.	"Nothing from Nothing" (Original Karaoke)	5:40
