= Five (EP) =

EP by Ayumi Hamasaki
- Released: August 31, 2011
- Recorded: 2011
- Genres: Pop; R&B; pop rock
- Length: 29:49 (CD+DVD); 31:53 (CD only); 25:36 (CD only; limited edition)
- Label: Avex Trax
- Producer: Max Matsuura

Ayumi Hamasaki chronology
Love Songs (2010)	Five (2011)	Party Queen (2012)

Five is the second mini-album by Japanese singer Ayumi Hamasaki. It was released on 31 August 2011, in three editions: CD+DVD, CD-Only and a limited CD-Only edition. A Blu-ray version of the mini-album was released on 9 November 2011, making Five the world's first album to be released in Blu-Ray. Hamasaki was the only lyricist on Five, and the songs were composed by multiple composers. The EP gets it title from its track listing, which consists of five tracks.

No physical singles were released from Five, making it Hamasaki's first album without any singles. However, all five songs were used as commercial tie-ins prior to the album's release. Therefore, Five really contained no previously unheard material. Five debuted atop the Oricon charts with first week sales of over 125,000 copies, becoming her eighteenth album to do so. It topped the charts for two consecutive weeks, her first album to do so since (Miss)Understood in 2006, and was her first album to top the Oricon Monthly Chart since Next Level in 2009. Five was certified gold by the Recording Industry Association of Japan, but it became Hamasaki's first album to fail to be certified platinum since her career began. Five sold around 213,000 copies.

== Information ==
Five is Hamasaki's first mini-album since Memorial address, which was released in 2003. This is Hamasaki first album not to have any singles. Its five songs had commercial endorsements prior to the release of the album: "Progress" was used as the theme song of the PlayStation 3 videogame Tales of Xillia; "Another Song" was used as theme song of the TV show SweetTV of channel BeeTV; "Why..." was used in TV commercials of Taiwan campaigns of travel agency H.I.S., as well as in commercials for RecoChoku; "Beloved" was used as the theme song of August of NTV show Sukkiri!!; and "Brillante" was used in TV commercials of Music.jp.

The limited edition of the CD includes an access card to download a character costume for Tales of Xillia. Also, first pressings of the CD+DVD edition included a serial number to access a special website broadcasting making-of material of Ayumi Hamasaki Countdown Live 2010-2011 A: Do It Again.

Many netizens have wondered why this mini-album was named Five, if it was just because the album has only 5 tracks. On the Sweet interview, Hamasaki hinted that there is a hidden word in the title of the mini-album, 'H♡PE', which was figured out by her fans. They predicted that Five was released not only because it has 5 songs, it was also 5 months after the disastrous earthquake and tsunami that hit Japan in March. For the first time, Hamasaki undertook the artwork of the font design herself.

== Track listing ==
All lyrics are written by Ayumi Hamasaki.

CD
No.	Title	Music	Arranger(s)	Length
1.	"Progress"	Yuta Nakano	Yuta Nakano	5:06
2.	"Another Song" (featuring Naoya Urata)	Yuta Nakano	Yuta Nakano	5:21
3.	"Why..." (featuring Juno)	Kazuhiro Hara	Yuta Nakano	3:57
4.	"Beloved"	Yasuhiko Hoshino	Yuta Nakano	5:19
5.	"Brillante"	Timothy Wellard	Yuta Nakano	5:58/10:05 (CD+DVD)

CD+DVD secret track
No.	Title	Music	Arranger(s)	Length
6.	"Why..." (featuring Naoya Urata)	Kazuhiro Hara	Yuta Nakano

CD Only bonus track
No.	Title	Music	Arranger(s)	Length
6.	"Beloved (Orchestra version)"	Yasuhiko Hoshino	Yuta Nakano	6:10

DVD
No.	Title	Length
1.	"Progress" (Video Clip)
2.	"Another Song" (featuring Naoya Urata) (Video Clip)
3.	"Why..." (featuring Juno) (Video Clip)
4.	"Beloved" (Video Clip)
5.	"Brillante" (Video Clip)
6.	"Progress" (Making Clip)
7.	"Another Song" (Making Clip)
8.	"Why..." (Making Clip)
9.	"Beloved" (Making Clip)
10.	"Brillante" (Making Clip)

== Charts ==
Oricon Sales Chart (Japan)

Release	Chart	Peak position	First week sales	Sales total	Chart run
August 31, 2011	Oricon Daily Albums Chart	1	56,258		
August 31, 2011	Oricon Weekly Albums Chart	1	127,024	235,000	20 weeks
August 31, 2011	Oricon Monthly Albums Chart	1	189,551		
August 31, 2011	Oricon Yearly Albums Chart	30	210,000		

G-Music Chart (Taiwan)

Release	Chart	Peak position	Percentage Sales	Chart run
September 2, 2011	Combo Chart	7	1.58%	2 Weeks
September 2, 2011	Japanese Chart	2	17.73%	6 Weeks

=== Certifications ===
Country	Provider	Certification
Japan	RIAJ	Gold
