= Naoya Urata =

Japanese singer, actor and dancer (born 1982)

- 浦田 直也
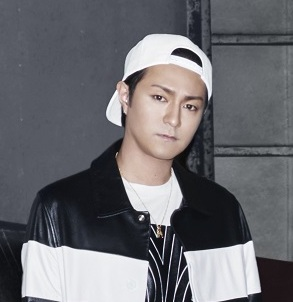
- Urata in 2015
- Born: November 10, 1982 (age 43); Tokyo, Japan
- Occupations: Singer; actor
- Years active: 2002–present
- Musical career
- Genres: R&B; J-pop; Dance-pop
- Instrument: Vocals
- Labels: Avex Trax; cutting edge
- Formerly of: AAA
- Website: uratanaoya.com

Naoya Urata (浦田 直也, Urata Naoya; born November 10, 1982) is a Japanese singer and actor. He is a former member of the group AAA.

== Career ==
Following Urata's arrest in April 2019, he announced he was leaving AAA on December 31, 2019.

== Controversy ==
On April 19, 2019, Urata was arrested for allegedly assaulting a 20-year-old woman after she rejected his offer to buy her a drink. Urata later claimed that he was drunk at the time and did not remember the incident.

== Discography ==
=== Studio albums ===
Title	Album details	Peak	Sales
Title	Album details	JPN	Sales
Turn Over	Released: January 28, 2009; Format: CD, CD+DVD; Label: Cutting Edge	71	
Unlock	Released: April 26, 2017; Format: CD, CD+DVD; Label: Avex Trax	10	
Untitled	Released: November 10, 2021; Format: CD, CD+DVD, CD+Blu-ray; Label: Avex Trax	29	

=== Cover albums ===
Title	Album details	Peak	Sales
Title	Album details	JPN	Sales
Unchanged	Released: December 4, 2013; Format: CD; Label: Avex Trax	27	JPN: 5,100

=== Compilation albums ===
Title	Album details	Peak	Sales
Title	Album details	JPN	Sales
un Best	Released: December 21, 2015; Format: CD, CD+DVD; Label: Avex Trax	20	

=== Singles ===
Title	Year	Peak	Sales
Title	Year	JPN	Sales
"Dream On"	2010	1	JPN: 47,000

== Filmography ==
=== TV series ===
Year	Title	Role	Network	Notes
2008	Feature Century Shakespeare		Kansai TV(KTV)	

=== Movie ===
Year	Title	Role	Network	Notes
2007	Heat Island	Takeshi		

== Radio ==
Year	Title	Network	Notes
2006	Radio 'n Fire	TBC Radio	Regular personality
2008	AAA Urata Naoya no Ike! Urata Naoya	TBC Radio	
