= Again (Ayumi Hamasaki EP) =

EP by Ayumi Hamasaki
- Released: December 8, 2012
- Recorded: 2012
- Genre: Pop
- Label: Avex Trax
- Producer: Max Matsuura

Ayumi Hamasaki chronology
| Love (2012) | Again (2012) | A Classical (2013) |

Again (stylized as again) is the fourth extended play by Japanese recording artist Ayumi Hamasaki from her fourteenth studio album Love Again (2013). The EP contains the songs "Wake Me Up", "Sweet Scar", "Snowy Kiss" and "Ivy", alongside remixes and instrumental versions of the original tracks. Produced by longtime collaborator Max Matsuura, Again is a pop EP.

Again was released as the second part of Hamasaki's fifteenth anniversary celebration on December 8, 2012 by Avex Trax. It received mixed reviews from music critics; some critics commended the songs "safe" composition while some criticized the production and delivery. Charted as a single on the Japanese Oricon Singles Chart, it reached number seven. All tracks from Again received an accompanying music video and was included on the DVD version.

== Background and release ==
In September 2012, Hamasaki and her label Avex Trax confirmed that they would release five new music releases from November 2012 until March 2013 to commemorate Hamasaki's fifteenth year in music business on April 8, 2013. Avex confirmed the releases of two extended plays; Love (November 2012) and Again (December 2012), and announced plans to release the compilation album A Classical and a live DVD Arena Tour 2012: Hotel Love Songs. Love was released first, reaching number four on the Japanese Oricon Singles Chart and was certified gold by the Recording Industry Association of Japan (RIAJ) for exceeding shipments of 100,000 units. Hamasaki announced plans on releasing a new studio album, and revealed that the recordings from both EPs would be included on the album. Again contains four original tracks: "Wake Me Up", "Sweet Scar", "Snowy Kiss" and "Ivy". Again was released on December 8, 2012, through Avex Trax on two formats: a stand-alone CD and a CD and DVD package. The music videos to "Wake Me Up", "Sweet Scar" and "Snowy Kiss" were featured on the DVD version of the EP.

== Composition ==
All lyrics to Again were written by Hamasaki herself, while the album was produced by long-time collaborator Max Matsuura. The album opener, "Wake Me Up", is a "glossy 1980s" electronic rock song that was compared to the work of British group Duran Duran. The second track "Sweet Scar" is a pop ballad that features violin sections, piano riffs and woodwind instruments, which was noted as a musical departure from her signature "big orchestrated strings and stadium drums". The third track "Snowy Kiss" is an uptempo dance-pop song that lasts six minutes long, and "Ivy" has Hamasaki singing in higher octaves with a slower tempo. Again features an acoustic remix of "Missing" and "Melody" that appeared on Love, one remix each for "Wake Me Up" and "Snowy Kiss" and the original instrumentals.

== Reception ==
The songs from Again received mixed reviews. Random J from Asian Junkie reviewed "Sweet Scar" and "Wake Me Up" individually. For "Sweet Scar", he commented "The past four years in J-pop have been dire on the ballad front, but Ayu manages to come through here with "Sweet Scar", exhibiting the only moment of the album where she changes gears from her quotidian norm when it comes to ballads." He concluded on the song by stating "Ayu can deliver a nice ballad without musical theatrics, and that her voice is at its most emotive when she isn't screeching like some demon ho of the underworld." For "Wake Me Up", he highlighted it as an album stand out track, saying that it was a "banger". CDJournal.com reviewed each song individually. For "Wake Me Up" and "Sweet Scar", they praised Hamasaki's vocals for being "powerful" and "strong". For "Snowy Kiss", they praised Hamasaki's songwriting and commended the production, while they commended Hamasaki's subtle vocals on "Ivy".

Charting as a single, Again reached number seven on the Japanese Oricon Singles Chart and lasted ten weeks in the chart. Again sold over 53,000 units in Japan, her lowest charting and selling EP to date and her first EP not to achieve a certification by the Recording Industry Association of Japan (RIAJ). (Note: Sales provided by Oricon database and are rounded to the nearest thousand copies.)

== Track listing ==
All lyrics are written by Ayumi Hamasaki.

CD
| No. | Title | Music | Arranger(s) | Length |
|---|---|---|---|---|
| 1. | "Wake Me Up" (Original Mix) | Hiten Bharadia, Philippe-Marc Anquetil, Bardur Haberg | Tasuku | 4:05 |
| 2. | "Sweet Scar" (Original Mix) | D.A.I. | Yuta Nakano | 4:12 |
| 3. | "Snowy Kiss" (Original Mix) | Tetsuya Komuro | Yuta Nakano | 6:10 |
| 4. | "Ivy" (Original Mix) | Tetsuya Komuro | Yuta Nakano | 4:39 |
| 5. | "Missing" (Orchestra Version) | Kazuhiro Hara | Yuta Nakano | 5:13 |
| 6. | "Melody" (Acoustic Piano Version) | Yasuhiko Hoshino | Shingo Kobayashi | 5:20 |
| 7. | "Wake Me Up" (Remo-con Remix) | Hiten Bharadia, Philippe-Marc Anquetil, Bardur Haberg | Remo-con | 4:54 |
| 8. | "Snowy Kiss" (Shohei Matsumoto Remix) | Tetsuya Komuro | Shohei Matsumoto | 7:02 |
| 9. | "Wake Me Up" (Instrumental) | Hiten Bharadia, Philippe-Marc Anquetil, Bardur Haberg | Tasuku | 4:05 |
| 10. | "Sweet Scar" (Instrumental) | D.A.I. | Yuta Nakano | 4:12 |
| 11. | "Snowy Kiss" (Instrumental) | Tetsuya Komuro | Yuta Nakano | 6:10 |
| 12. | "Ivy" (Instrumental) | Tetsuya Komuro | Yuta Nakano | 4:39 |

DVD
| No. | Title | Length |
|---|---|---|
| 1. | "Wake Me Up" (Video Clip) |
| 2. | "Snowy Kiss" (Video Clip) |
| 3. | "Sweet Scar" (Video Clip) |

== Credits and personnel ==
Song credits

- Ayumi Hamasaki – vocals, background vocals, songwriting
- Max Matsuura – producer
- Hiten Bharadia – composer
- Philippe-Marc Anquetil – composer
- Bárður Háberg – composer
- Dai Nagao – composer
- Tetsuya Komuro – composer
- Kazuhiro Hara – composer
- Yasuhiko Hoshino – composer
- Tasuku – arranger
- Yuta Nakano – arranger
- Shingo Kobayashi – arranger
- Remo-con – arranger, remixer
- Shohei Matsumoto – arranger, remixer

Visual and video credits

- Masashi Muto – director
- Wataru Takeishi – director
- Takuma Noriage – art direction, creative direction
- Ryan Chan – photographer
- Takuma Noriage – design

Credits adapted from the EP's liner notes.

== Charts and certifications ==
=== Charts ===
| Chart (2015) | Peak position |
|---|---|
| Japan Weekly Chart (Oricon) | 7 |

=== Certifications and sales ===
| Region | Certification | Certified units/sales |
|---|---|---|
| Japan | — | 80,000 |
