= China Record Corporation =

Chinese state-owned record company

- Founded: 1949
- Distributor: IODA (USA)
- Genre: Folk music, Guoyue, Chinese opera, Mandopop
- Country of origin: China
- Location: Beijing (main); Chengdu; Shanghai; Shenzhen
- Official website: www.China-CRC.com.cn

China Record Corporation (CRC; Chinese: 中国唱片总公司; pinyin: Zhōngguó Chàngpiàn Zǒngōnggsī) is the Chinese government's oldest and largest record company. CRC's catalog of traditional Chinese ethnic, classical and folk music features over 60,000 releases spanning over 1,000 years of Chinese musical history, and includes the Peking operas and a large collection of children's tunes and pop music. Many of the recordings, which date back to the 1920s and 1930s, are the oldest known recordings in China.

During the Cultural Revolution, production of records was the sole purview of the China Record Corporation.

== See also ==
- List of record labels
