= Love (Ayumi Hamasaki EP) =

EP by Ayumi Hamasaki
- Released: November 8, 2012
- Recorded: 2012
- Genres: Pop, dance-pop, pop rock
- Length: 61:53
- Label: Avex Trax
- Producer: Max Matsuura

Ayumi Hamasaki chronology
A Summer Best (2012)	Love (2012)	Again (2012)

Love (stylized as LOVE) is the third mini-album by Japanese recording artist Ayumi Hamasaki. It was released on 8 November 2012 in three editions: CD+DVD, CD-Only and a limited Tales of Xillia 2 Edition.

The EP's track list is formatted similarly to Hamasaki's singles, including remixes and instrumentals, which was different on how she presented her mini-albums in the past. Love reached #4 on the Oricon charts, selling 64,841 copies in its first week. It ended up selling 94,347 copies, receiving a gold certification by the Recording Industry Association of Japan for shipments of 100,000 copies.

== Information ==
Love is the first from five consecutive monthly releases from Hamasaki to celebrate her 15th anniversary in the music industry. It has three new songs: "Song 4 U", "Missing" and "Melody" as well as remixes of them and remixes of "You & Me", which was released digitally few months earlier.

The first track on the album, "Song 4 U", was used as the theme song for the 2012 video game Tales of Xillia 2.

At first, Hamasaki included a music video for "Melody" for the track list in the DVD was eventually replaced by a music video for "Missing". "Melody"'s music video will then be included on her 14th studio album, Love Again.

Love is Hamasaki first mini-album not to top the oricon charts, debuting at number 4 with sales of just 64,841. It sold a total of 88,435 in 2012, ending up as the 76th best selling album of the year. Hamasaki had stated that these five releases, including Love, are meant for her fans and not about sales and ranking. Love also charted at 7 at Japan Billboard Top Albums. In Taiwan, it charted at #2 at its debut week and rise to #1 in the following week. Her last number one album in Taiwan was Rock 'n' Roll Circus in 2010.

== Track listing ==
All lyrics are written by Ayumi Hamasaki.

CD
No.	Title	Music	Arranger(s)	Length
1.	"Song 4 U" (original mix)	HINATAspring, Yuta Nakano	Yuta Nakano	3:51
2.	"Missing" (original mix)	Kazuhiro Hara	Yuta Nakano	4:58
3.	"Melody" (original mix)	Yasuhiko Hoshino	Yuta Nakano	5:26
4.	"Song 4 U" (orchestra version)	HINATAspring, Yuta Nakano	Yuta Nakano	4:22
5.	"You & Me" (Remo-con rmx - extended)	Tetsuya Komuro	Remo-con	7:28
6.	"You & Me" (Shinichi Osawa remix)	Tetsuya Komuro	Shinichi Osawa	5:01
7.	"Missing" (Dubscribe remix)	Kazuhiro Hara	Dubscribe	5:07
8.	"Melody" (Broken Haze remix)	Yasuhiko Hoshino	Broken Haze	5:58
9.	"Song 4 U" (instrumental)	HINATAspring, Yuta Nakano	Yuta Nakano	3:50
10.	"Missing" (instrumental)	Kazuhiro Hara	Yuta Nakano	4:57
11.	"Melody" (instrumental)	Yasuhiko Hoshino	Yuta Nakano	5:24
12.	"You & Me" (instrumental)	Tetsuya Komuro	Tasuku	5:39

DVD
No.	Title	Length
1.	"Song 4 U" (video clip)
2.	"Missing" (video clip)
3.	"Song 4 U" (making clip)

== Charts and Certifications ==
Oricon Chart

Chart	Peak position	Debut sales	Total sales
Oricon Daily Chart	3	21,743	130,000
Oricon Weekly Chart	4	64,841	130,000
Oricon Monthly Chart	11	86,095	130,000
Oricon Yearly Chart	76	88,345	130,000

G-Music Chart (Taiwan)

Release	Chart	Peak position	Percentage sales
November 8, 2012	Combo Chart	4	1.82%
November 8, 2012	Japanese Chart	1	16.53%

=== Certifications ===
Country	Provider	Certification
Japan	RIAJ	Gold
