= Sunrise/Sunset (Love Is All) =

Single by Ayumi Hamasaki

from the album Rock 'n' Roll Circus
- Released: August 12, 2009
- Recorded: 2009
- Genre: J-pop, pop rock
- Label: Avex Trax
- Songwriters: Ayumi Hamasaki (lyrics); Hana Nishimura (music)
- Producer: Max Matsuura

Ayumi Hamasaki singles chronology
"Rule/Sparkle" (2009)	"Sunrise/Sunset (Love Is All)" (2009)	"You Were.../Ballad" (2009)

Official Music Video
- "Sunrise (Love Is All)" on YouTube

Official Music Video
- "Sunset (Love Is All)" on YouTube

"Sunrise/Sunset (Love Is All)" (stylised as Sunrise/Sunset ～LOVE is ALL～) is Japanese singer Ayumi Hamasaki's forty-sixth (forty-seventh overall) single, released on August 12, 2009. The song "Sunrise: Love is All" is used as the theme song to the 2009 Japanese drama show, Dandy Daddy? In addition, the song "Sunset: Love is All" was used in advertisements for the Panasonic Lumix FX-60 digital camera. The single debuted at #1 on Oricon weekly charts and became her 44th Top 10 single, making her the first artist to have 44 Top 10 singles in Oricon history. The single became Hamasaki's 21st consecutive single to debut at number-one position since her 2002 single "Free & Easy" on the Oricon weekly charts, making her the first solo artist and the first female artist to have 21 consecutive singles to debut at number-one position. It is also her 33rd number-one single on the Oricon weekly charts.

== Music video ==
The music videos for Sunrise and Sunset were filmed on a sightseeing tower at the bay of Chiba prefecture, Kantō. This tower, the Futtsu-Misaki, is a 100-year commemoration structure for the end of Meiji period (1868). Members of TeamAyu (Hamasaki's official fan club) were able to apply to be part of the audience for the PVs. Almost 1000 people applied for participation, and about 300 of those were selected.

- The choreographers for the PVs were Ayumi Hamasaki's dancers Zin for Sunrise and Maro for Sunset. The PVs feature all of Ayumi's dancers and 300 fans.

In the first video, Sunrise, Ayumi is hopping around and laughing; the fans are waving towels; and the male dancers are shouting, dancing, and animating the fans. The entire video shows Ayumi's performance.

The second video, Sunset, is set on the same structure as the first, the morning light having been replaced by a sun setting in the background. This video features only the female dancers and Ayumi. Like the first one, the video shows only Ayumi's 'Sunset' performance.

== Track listing ==
All lyrics are written by Ayumi Hamasaki.

CD
No.	Title	Length
1.	"Sunrise (Love Is All) (Original Mix)"	4:48
2.	"Sunset (Love Is All) (Original Mix)"	5:49
3.	"Fairyland/Glitter/Blue Bird/Greatful Days/July 1st (Mega Mash-Up Mix)"	7:46
4.	"Sunrise (Love Is All) (Instrumental)"	4:48
5.	"Sunset (Love Is All) (Instrumental)"	5:49

DVD
No.	Title	Length
1.	"Sunrise (Love Is All) (Video Clip)"
2.	"Sunset (Love Is All) (Video Clip)"
3.	"Sunrise (Love Is All) (Making Clip)"

== Performances ==
1. August 8, 2009 - CDTV (Sunrise: Love is All)
2. August 9, 2009 - Music Japan (Sunrise: Love is All)
3. August 14, 2009 - Music Station (Sunrise: Love is All)
4. August 14, 2009 - Music Fighter (Sunrise: Love is All)
5. August 15, 2009 - Music Fair (Sunrise/Sunset: Love is All, Boys & Girls)
6. August 17, 2009 - Hey! Hey! Hey! Music Champ

== Charts ==
=== Oricon sales charts ===
Release	Chart	Peak position	First week sales	Sales total
August 12, 2009	Oricon Daily Singles Chart	1		
August 12, 2009	Oricon Weekly Singles Chart	1	75,352	130,000
August 12, 2009	Oricon Monthly Singles Chart	4		
August 12, 2009	Oricon Yearly Singles Chart	50		

=== Billboard Japan ===
Release	Chart	Peak position
August 12, 2009	Billboard Japan Hot 100	2
August 12, 2009	Billboard Japan Hot Singles Sales	2

=== Overseas charts ===
Chart	Peak position
G-Music J-Pop Charts	3
G-Music Combo Charts	10
J-Pop/K-Pop Five Music Record	2
