= Depend on You =

1998 single by Ayumi Hamasaki

Single by Ayumi Hamasaki

from the album A Song for ××
- B-side: "Two of Us"
- Released: December 9, 1998; February 28, 2001; February 28, 2016; March 8, 2004 (Europe)
- Recorded: 1998
- Genre: J-pop
- Length: 4:20
- Label: Avex Trax
- Songwriters: Ayumi Hamasaki (lyrics); Kazuhito Kikuchi, Daisuke Miyaji & Ryosuke Imai (music)
- Producer: Max Matsuura

Ayumi Hamasaki singles chronology
"For My Dear..." (1998)	"Depend on You" (1998)	"Whatever" (1999)

Ayumi Hamasaki singles chronology
"Whatever" (2001)	"Depend on You" (2001)	"For My Dear..." (2001)

Ayumi Hamasaki Europen singles chronology
"M" (2003)	"Depend on You" (2004)	"Naturally" (2004)

Official Music Video
- "Depend on You" on YouTube

"Depend on You" is the fifth single released by Ayumi Hamasaki on December 9, 1998. The single reached number nine on the weekly Oricon chart, becoming her third consecutive top-ten single in Japan. The single contains a B-side, "Two of Us", which was never released on an album. Both songs were featured in the PlayStation RPG Thousand Arms.

== Track listing ==
1. "Depend on You"
2. "Two of Us"
3. "Depend on You" (instrumental)

== Re-release ==
This single was re-released on February 28, 2001, featuring five new tracks. The single was re-released for the fact that it was initially released in 1998 only in the 3" CD format, which by this time had been replaced by the new standard "maxi" CD format. In this case, the single was re-released in 2001 for a wider compatibility.

=== Track listing ===
1. "Depend on You"
2. "Two of Us
3. "Depend on You" (Dub's Electro Remix)
4. "Depend on You" (44XL dub)
5. "Depend on You" (Bodyguard mix)
6. "Two of Us" (PPS Connection mix)
7. "Two of Us" (Touch of Mahogany mix)
8. "Depend on You" (Instrumental)

Depend on You was also remixed and released in Mirrorcle World for her 10th anniversary of chart-topping singles.

== Music video ==
The music video for "Depend on you" was directed by Muto Masashi. It depicts Hamasaki singing while on a "journey" of sorts – a road is shown, and she sings at various natural locales, including a mountain and a pond.

- Assistant Producer: Naohito Watanabe (prime direction)
- Director: Masashi Muto (prime direction)
- Assistant Director: Takahide Ishii (prime direction)
- Production Manager: Asako Tsutsumi (prime direction), Hiroyuki Sawada
- Production Assistant: Shinobu Fukuda, Akiko Nishimura (prime direction)
- Director of Photography: Kenichi Kawabata (La CERISE)
- Light: Takahiro Tatara (IMAGE STUDIO 109)
- Stylist: Koji Matsumoto
- Hair: Tamotsu (Too RUSTIC)
- Make Up: Chu (Too RUSTIC)

Disambiguation

== Live performances ==
- December 8, 1998 – Utaban – Depend on You
- December 10, 1998 – Hit MMM – Depend on You
- December 11, 1998 – Music Station – Depend on You
- December 16, 1998 – Pocket Music – Depend on You
- December 19, 1998 – Countdown TV – Depend on You
- December 21, 1998 – Hey! Hey! Hey! – Depend on You
- December 24, 1998 – Happy Christmas Special – Depend on You
- December 25, 1998 – Music Station – Depend on You
- December 30, 1998 – Super Live – Depend on You
- December 31, 1998 – Countdown TV – Depend on You
- January 23, 1999 – Pop Jam – Depend on You
- March 3, 1999 – Japan Gold Disc Awards – Depend on You
- December 22, 1999 – Fresh Live – Depend on You

== Chart positions ==
Chart (1998)	Peak position	Time in chart	Ref
Japan Oricon^{1}	6	9 weeks	
Chart (2001)	Peak position	Time in chart	
Japan Oricon²	27	3 weeks	

^{1}Original version

²Re-release version

Oricon sales: 131,460 (Original version)

== European version ==
In 2004, "Depend on You" was also released in Europe as a trance single. The CD single was only released in Germany but the digital single was released worldwide.

1. "Depend on You" (Svenson & Gielen radio edit)
2. "Depend on You" (DJ Shog radio edit)
3. "Depend on You" (DJ Shog dub mix)
4. "Depend on You" (Svenson & Gielen club mix)
5. "Depend on You" (Svenson & Gielen instrumental mix)
