= You (Ayumi Hamasaki song) =

Song by Ayumi Hamasaki

Single by Ayumi Hamasaki

from the album A Song for ××
- Released: June 10, 1998
- Recorded: 1998
- Genre: J-pop
- Length: 4:46
- Label: Avex Trax
- Songwriter(s): Yasuhiko Hoshino (music); Ayumi Hamasaki (lyrics)
- Producer(s): Max Matsuura

Ayumi Hamasaki singles chronology
"Poker Face" (1998)	"You" (1998)	"Trust" (1998)

Official Music Video
- "You" on YouTube

"You" is the second single by Ayumi Hamasaki. It was released on June 10, 1998.

== Track listing ==
1. "You"
2. "You" (acoustic version)
3. "You" (instrumental)

"You"

Single by Ayumi Hamasaki
- Released: February 28, 2001; February 28, 2016
- Recorded: 1998
- Genre: J-pop
- Length: 39:05
- Label: Avex Trax
- Songwriter(s): Ayumi Hamasaki

Ayumi Hamasaki singles chronology
"Trust" (2001)	"You" (2001)	"Poker Face" (2001)

== Re-release ==
This single was re-released on February 28, 2001, featuring four new songs.

=== Track listing ===
1. "You"
2. "You" (acoustic version)
3. "Wishing" (Taku's Chemistry mix)
4. "You" (Masters of Funk R&B remix)
5. "You" (Orienta-Rhythm club mix)
6. "You" (Dub's Uplifting mix)
7. "You" (instrumental)

== Live performances ==
- June 6, 1998 - Utaban - You
- June 19, 1998 - Music Station - You
- June 20, 1998 - Pop Jam - You
- December 25, 1998 - Music Station - You
- December 14, 2002 - Ayuready? - You

== Music video ==
The music video for "You" was directed by Takeishi Wataru. The video shows Hamasaki in different colored rooms. In each room something different is happening such as apples falling to the floor, Hamasaki playing a miniature piano, and her eating spaghetti. At the end of the video Hamasaki walks outside revealing a large house on the beach.

== Chart positions ==
Chart (1998)	Peak position	Time in chart
Japan Oricon ^{1}	20	10 weeks
Chart (2001)	Peak position	Time in chart
Japan Oricon ²	25	6 weeks

^{1}Original version

²Re-release version

Certification: Gold

Oricon sales: 78,260 (original version)
