= Poker Face (Ayumi Hamasaki song) =

1998 song

Single by Ayumi Hamasaki

from the album A Song for ××
- B-side: "Friend"
- Released: April 8, 1998
- Genre: J-pop
- Length: 4:41
- Label: Avex Trax
- Composer(s): Yasuhiko Hoshino
- Lyricist(s): Ayumi Hamasaki
- Producer(s): Max Matsuura

Ayumi Hamasaki singles chronology
| "Poker Face" (1998) | "You" (1998) |

Official Music Video
- "Poker Face" on YouTube

"Poker Face" (Japanese: ポーカー・フェイス; stylized as "poker face") is the debut single by Japanese singer Ayumi Hamasaki for her album A Song for ××. It was released under Avex Trax on 8 April 1998. Hamasaki wrote the lyrics and Yasuhiko Hoshino composed the music. The song peaked at number 20 on the Japanese Singles Chart and was certified as Gold by the Recording Industry Association of Japan (RIAJ). The song was re-released in 2001.

== Chart performance ==
"Poker Face" entered at #20 on the charts with 11,520 units sold in its opening week and charted for six weeks. The single sold a total of 43,140 copies. The single was certified Gold by the RIAJ.

== Music video ==
The music video for "Poker Face" was directed by Takeishi Wataru. The video focuses on Hamasaki standing in front of a large tree filled with television monitors that show her in various locations. It also shows her playing with animals.

== Promotion ==
The song was used as the opening theme of a Japanese TV show called "Count Down TV".

== Track listing ==
1. "Poker Face"
2. "Friend"
3. "Poker Face" (Instrumental)
4. "Friend" (Instrumental)

== Re-release ==
"Poker Face"

Single by Ayumi Hamasaki
- Released: February 28, 2001; February 28, 2016
- Length: 42:41
- Label: Avex Trax
- Composer(s): Yasuhiko Hoshino
- Lyricist(s): Ayumi Hamasaki

This single was re-released on February 28, 2001, featuring four new songs. The song re-entered the Japanese Singles Chart and peaked at number 31.

=== Track listing ===
1. "Poker Face"
2. "Friend"
3. "Poker Face" (KM Marble Life Remix)
4. "Poker Face" (Nao'S Attitude Mix)
5. "Poker Face" (D-Z Spiritual Delusion Mix)
6. "Poker Face" (Orienta-Rhythm Club Mix)
7. "Poker Face" (Instrumental)
8. "Friend" (Instrumental)

== Live performances ==
- April 14, 1998 - Nikkan Hitto - Poker Face
- April 20, 1998 - Hey! Hey! Hey! - Poker Face
- April 21, 1998 - Utaban - Poker Face
- April 24, 1998 - Rave - Poker Face
- April 28, 1998 - Music Station - Poker Face

== Chart performance ==
| Chart (1998) | Peak position |
|---|---|
| Japanese Singles Chart (Oricon) | 20 |

| Chart (2001) | Peak position |
|---|---|
| Japanese Singles Chart (Oricon) | 31 |

| Chart (2008) | Peak position |
|---|---|
| Adult Alternative Airplay (Billboard) | 81 |
