= Trust (Ayumi Hamasaki song) =

1998 single by Ayumi Hamasaki

Single by Ayumi Hamasaki

from the album A Song for ××
- Released: August 5, 1998
- Recorded: 1998
- Genre: J-pop
- Length: 4:48
- Label: Avex Trax
- Songwriter(s): Takashi Kimura (music); Ayumi Hamasaki (lyrics)
- Producer(s): Max Matsuura

Ayumi Hamasaki singles chronology
"You" (1998)	"Trust" (1998)	"For My Dear..." (1998)

Official Music Video
- "Trust" on YouTube

"Trust" is the third single released by Ayumi Hamasaki on August 5, 1998. It was her first single to enter the Top Ten of the Oricon weekly charts.

== Track listing ==
1. "Trust"
2. "Trust" (Acoustic Version)
3. "Trust" (Instrumental)

"Trust"

Single by Ayumi Hamasaki
- Released: February 28, 2001; February 28, 2016
- Recorded: 1998
- Length: 34:58
- Label: Avex Trax
- Producer(s): Max Matsuura

Ayumi Hamasaki singles chronology
"For My Dear..." (2001)	"Trust" (2001)	"You" (2001)

== Re-release ==
This single was re-released on February 28, 2001, featuring 4 new songs.

=== Track listing ===
1. "Trust"
2. "Trust" (Acoustic Version)
3. "Powder Snow" (Dee Mix)
4. "Trust" (Dj Soma Grow Sound Mix)
5. "Trust" (Eddy Yamamoto Club Mix)
6. "Trust" (Groove That Soul Mix)
7. "Trust" (Instrumental)

== Live performances ==
- August 7, 1998 – Music Station - Trust
- August 10, 1998 – Hey! Hey! Hey! - Trust
- August 25, 1998 – Utaban - Trust
- September 5, 1998 – Pop Jam - Trust
- November 21, 1998 - All Japan Request Awards - Trust
- December 4, 1998 – Japan Cable Awards - Trust

== Chart positions ==
Chart (1998)	Peak position	Time in chart	Ref
Japan Oricon^{1}	9	10 weeks	
Chart (2001)	Peak position	Time in chart	
Japan Oricon²	29	2 weeks	

^{1}Original version
²Re-release version

Oricon sales: 181,820 (original version)
