= For My Dear... =

1998 single by Ayumi Hamasaki

Single by Ayumi Hamasaki

from the album A Song for ××
- Released: October 7, 1998
- Recorded: 1998
- Genre: J-pop
- Length: 4:33
- Label: Avex Trax
- Songwriter(s): Yasuhiko Hoshino (music); Ayumi Hamasaki (lyrics)
- Producer(s): Max Matsuura

Ayumi Hamasaki singles chronology
"Trust" (1998)	"For My Dear..." (1998)	"Depend on You" (1998)

Official Music Video
- "For My Dear..." on YouTube

"For My Dear..." is the fourth single released by Ayumi Hamasaki on October 7, 1998.

== Track listing ==
1. "For My Dear..."
2. "For My Dear..." (Acoustic Version)
3. "For My Dear..." (Instrumental)

"For My Dear…"

Single by Ayumi Hamasaki
- Released: February 28, 2001; February 28, 2016
- Recorded: 1998
- Genre: J-pop
- Length: 35:51
- Label: Avex Trax
- Songwriter(s): Ayumi Hamasaki
- Producer(s): Max Matsuura

Ayumi Hamasaki singles chronology
"Depend on You" (2001)	"For My Dear…" (2001)	"Trust" (2001)

== Re-release ==
This single was re-released on February 28, 2001, including four new songs.

=== Track listing ===
1. "For My Dear..."
2. "For My Dear..." (Acoustic Version)
3. "A Song for ××" (she shell Reproduction)
4. "Friend II" (Jazzy Jet Mix)
5. "As if…" (dub's L.B.M remix)
6. "For My Dear..." (Inst.)
7. "For My Dear..." (Acoustic Version Inst.)

== Live performances ==
- October 9, 1998 - Super Dream Live - For My Dear...
- October 17, 1998 - Pop Jam - For My Dear...
- October 24, 1998 - Countdown TV - For My Dear...
- October 30, 1998 - Music Station - For My Dear...
- November 9, 1998 - Hey! Hey! Hey! - For My Dear...

== Music video ==
The music video of For My Dear... was directed by Odagami Hiromitsu. The video features Hamasaki sitting in a bar watching people come and go. The video then follows a few of the visitors as they leave. The video also switches to a heavens gate scene where Hamasaki sings.

- Producer: Hasegawa Toru (HAT)
- Director: Odagami Yoko (HAT)
- Production Manager: Sato Naoki (HAT)
- Director of Photography: Sakamoto Seigo
- Light: Nishiyama Yoshiharu
- Stylist: Matsumoto Koji
- Hair: Tamotsu (Too RUSTIC)
- Make Up: Chu (Too RUSTIC)

== Success in the Malaysia ==
Ayumi Hamasaki's For My Dear... was played on Traxx FM., the first Japanese song to do so.

== Chart positions ==
Chart (1998)	Peak position	Time in chart
Japan Oricon^{1}	9	7 weeks
Chart (2001)	Peak position	Time in chart
Japan Oricon²	33	2 weeks

^{1}Original version
²Re-release version

Oricon sales: 74,440 (Original version)
