= Every Little Thing discography =

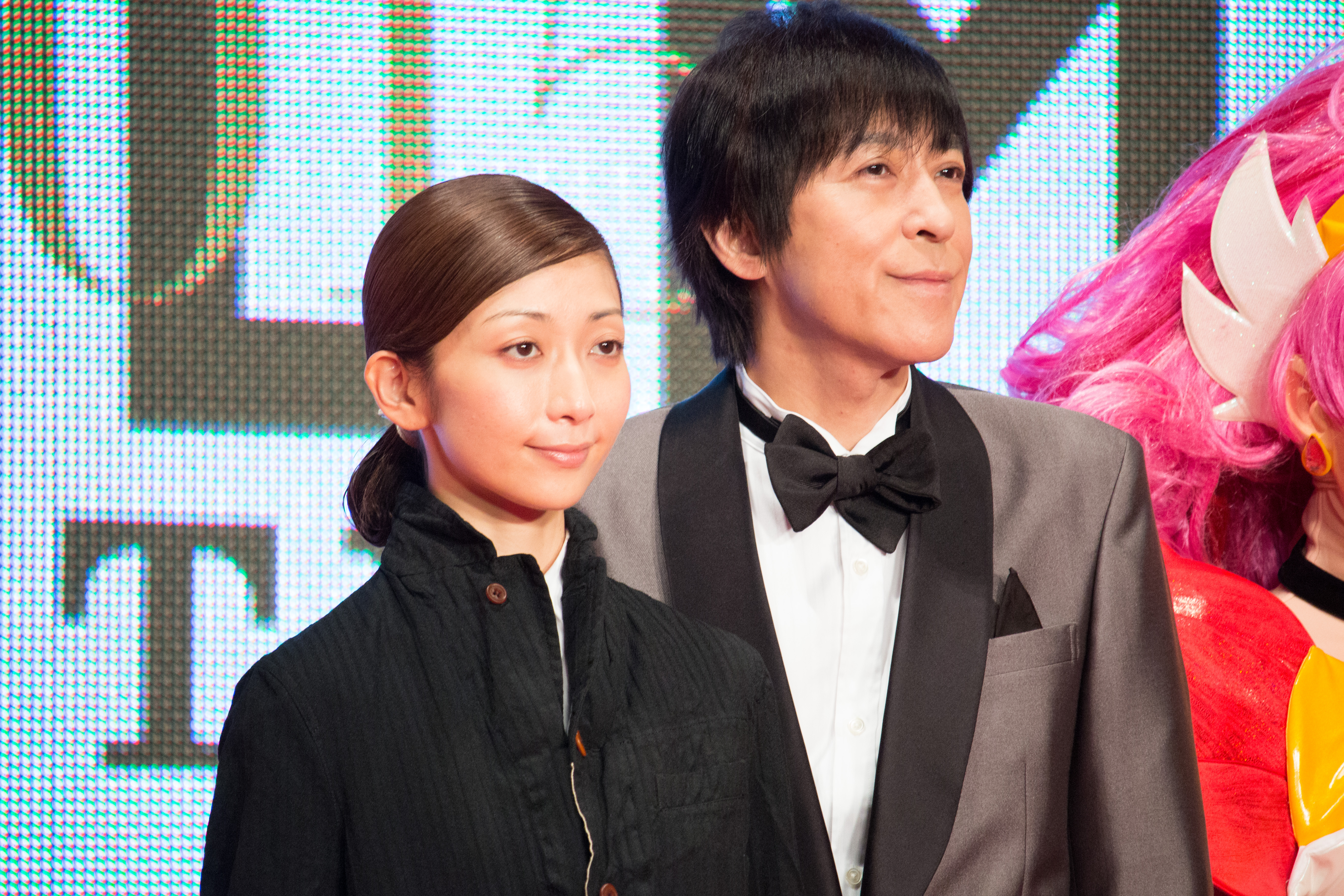
- Every Little Thing in 2015
- Studio albums: 12
- Compilation albums: 7
- Singles: 45
- Video albums: 22
- Remix albums: 2

The discography of Every Little Thing, a J-pop duo (former trio) formed in 1996 by Mitsuru Igarashi (synthesizer, music producer), Kaori Mochida (vocals, songwriting) and Ichiro Ito (guitar, songwriting), consists of twelve studio albums, seven compilation albums, five remix albums, and numerous singles and videos, many of which were commercially successful. The band debuted with their single "Feel My Heart" on August 7, 1996, which peaked at number twenty-four on the Japanese Oricon charts. Their first number one single was "For The Moment", released on June 4, 1997. Their most successful year was 1998, in which they released their 8th single "Time Goes By" which topped the charts and sold more than a million copies. Their second studio album Time to Destination released that year sold more than 3.5 million copies in Japan, their best-selling album to date. Number one singles of the band include "Forever Yours" (1998), "Fragile" (2001), Untitled 4 Ballads (2002) and "Koibumi" (2004).

Since their debut, Mitsuru Igarashi wrote, composed, arranged and produced almost all of their music, but in 2000 he decided to leave the group. Since then, Mochida and Ito started to take more control in their music making process as a band. However, in 2009, Igarashi and Every Little Thing met again and worked together in their album Change.

== Albums ==
=== Studio albums ===
List of albums, with selected chart positions
| Title | Album details | Peak positions | Sales | Certifications |
| Title | Album details | JPN | Sales | Certifications |
|---|---|---|---|---|
| Everlasting | Released: April 9, 1997; Label: Avex Trax; Formats: CD | 1 | 2,000,000 | RIAJ: 2× Million |
| Time to Destination | Released: April 15, 1998; Label: Avex Trax; Formats: CD | 1 | 3,500,000 | RIAJ: 4× Million |
| Eternity | Released: March 15, 2000; Label: Avex Trax; Formats: CD | 1 | 960,000 | RIAJ: Million |
| 4 Force | Released: March 22, 2001; Label: Avex Trax; Formats: CD | 2 | 850,000 | RIAJ: Million |
| Many Pieces | Released: March 19, 2003; Label: Avex Trax; Formats: CD | 1 | 520,000 | RIAJ: 2× Platinum |
| Commonplace | Released: March 10, 2004; Label: Avex Trax; Formats: CD, CD+DVD | 1 | 310,000 | RIAJ: Platinum |
| Crispy Park | Released: August 9, 2006; Label: Avex Trax; Formats: CD, CD+DVD | 1 | 200,000 | RIAJ: Gold |
| Door | Released: March 5, 2008; Label: Avex Trax; Formats: CD, CD+DVD | 2 | 90,000 | RIAJ: Gold |
| Change | Released: March 24, 2010; Label: Avex Trax; Formats: CD, CD+DVD | 8 | 30,000 | — |
| Ordinary | Released: September 21, 2011; Label: Avex Trax; Formats: CD, CD+DVD | 2 | 40,000 | — |
| Fun-Fare | Released: February 19, 2014; Label: Avex Trax; Formats: CD, CD+DVD | 7 | 10,000 | - |
| Tabitabi | Release: September 23, 2015; Label: Avex Trax; Formats: CD | 4 | 28,000 | - |

=== Compilation albums ===
List of albums, with selected chart positions
| Title | Album details | Peak positions | Sales |
| Title | Album details | JPN | Sales |
|---|---|---|---|
| Every Best Single +3 | Released: March 31, 1999; Label: Avex Trax; Formats: CD, DVD-Audio | 1 | 2,500,000 |
| Every Ballad Songs | Released: December 5, 2001; Label: Avex Trax; Formats: CD | 2 | 500,000 |
| Every Best Single 2 | Released: September 10, 2003; Label: Avex Trax; Formats: CD, CD+DVD | 1 | 700,000 |
| Acoustic : Latte | Released: February 16, 2005; Label: Avex Trax; Formats: CD, CD+DVD | 4 | 130,000 |
| 14 Message: Every Ballad Songs 2 | Released: February 14, 2007; Label: Avex Trax; Formats: CD | 2 | 110,000 |
| Every Best Single: Complete | Released: December 23, 2009; Label: Avex Trax; Formats: CD+DVD | 1 | 170,000 |
| Every Best Single 2: More Complete | Released: September 23, 2015; Label: Avex Trax; Formats: CD+DVD+Blu-ray, CD+DVD, CD+Blu-ray | 4 | 28,000 |

=== Remix albums ===
List of albums, with selected chart positions
| Title | Album details | Peak positions | Sales |
| Title | Album details | JPN | Sales |
|---|---|---|---|
| The Remixes | Released: September 17, 1997; Label: Avex Trax; Formats: CD | 2 | 640,000 |
| The Remixes II | Released: November 18, 1998; Label: Avex Trax; Formats: CD | 5 | 300,000 |
| Super Eurobeat Presents Euro Every Little Thing | Released: September 5, 2001; Label: Avex Trax; Formats: CD | 3 | 200,000 |
| The Remixes III: Mix Rice Plantation | Released: February 27, 2002; Label: Avex Trax; Formats: CD | 19 | 35,000 |
| Cyber Trance Presents ELT Trance | Released: February 27, 2002; Label: Avex Trax; Formats: CD | 16 | 60,000 |
| Every Cheering Songs | Released: January 14, 2015; Label: Avex Trax; Formats: CD | 27 | 2,200 |

=== Extended plays ===
| Year | Album | JPN |
|---|---|---|
| 2007 | iTunes Originals: Released: July 25; Label: Avex; Formats: Digital download | — |
| 2011 | Every Little Thing Member Select Best (Mochida/Ito version): Released: April 20; Label: Avex; Formats: Digital download | — |

== Singles ==
List of singles, with selected chart positions
| Title | Year | Peak chart positions | | Sales | Album |
| Title | Year | Oricon Singles Charts | Billboard Japan Hot 100 (Note: The Japan Hot 100 was established in February 2008.) | Sales | Album |
|---|---|---|---|---|---|
| "Feel My Heart" | 1996 | 24 | — | 129,000 | Everlasting |
| "Future World" | 1996 | 20 | — | 110,000 | Everlasting |
| "Dear My Friend" | 1997 | 9 | — | 488,000 | Everlasting |
| "For the Moment" | 1997 | 1 | — | 688,000 | Time to Destination |
| "Deatta Koro no Yō ni" | 1997 | 3 | — | 602,000 | Time to Destination |
| "Shapes of Love/Never Stop!" | 1997 | 3 | — | 526,000 | Time to Destination |
| "Face the Change" | 1998 | 1 | — | 633,000 | Time to Destination |
| "Time Goes By" | 1998 | 2 | — | 1,149,000 | Time to Destination |
| "Forever Yours" | 1998 | 1 | — | 475,000 | Every Best Single +3 |
| "Necessary" | 1998 | 2 | — | 233,000 | Every Best Single +3 |
| "Over and Over" | 1999 | 4 | — | 314,000 | Every Best Single +3 |
| "Someday, Someplace" | 1999 | 4 | — | 183,800 | Every Best Single +3 |
| "Pray/Get into a Groove" | 2000 | 2 | — | 407,000 | Eternity |
| "Sure" | 2000 | 2 | — | 250,000 | Eternity |
| "Rescue Me/Smile Again" | 2000 | 2 | — | 99,000 | Eternity |
| "Ai no Kakera" | 2000 | 2 | — | 206,000 | 4 Force |
| "Fragile/Jirenma" | 2001 | 1 | — | 834,000 | 4 Force |
| "Graceful World" | 2001 | 5 | — | 194,000 | 4 Force |
| "Jump" | 2001 | 7 | — | 107,000 | Many Pieces |
| "Kioku" | 2002 | 4 | — | 136,900 | Many Pieces |
| "Sasayaka na Inori" | 2002 | 5 | — | 77,000 | Many Pieces |
| "Untitled 4 Ballads" | 2002 | 1 | — | 369,000 | Many Pieces |
| "Grip!" | 2003 | 7 | — | 65,000 | Many Pieces |
| "Fundamental Love" | 2003 | 9 | — | 55,900 | Commonplace |
| "Mata Ashita" | 2003 | 3 | — | 180,000 | Commonplace |
| "Soraai" | 2004 | 8 | — | 48,000 | Commonplace |
| "Koibumi/Good Night" | 2004 | 1 | — | 156,000 | Crispy Park |
| "Kimi no Te" | 2005 | 2 | — | 74,000 | Crispy Park |
| "Azure Moon" | 2006 | 12 | — | 24,000 | Crispy Park |
| "Hi-Fi Message" | 2006 | 9 | — | 23,000 | Crispy Park |
| "Swimmy" | 2006 | 16 | — | 21,000 | Crispy Park |
| "Kirameki Hour" | 2007 | 14 | — | 20,000 | Door |
| "Koi o Shiteiru/Fuyu ga Hajimaru yo" | 2007 | 7 | — | 39,000 | Door |
| "Sakurabito" | 2008 | 9 | — | 24,000 | Door |
| "Atarashii Hibi/Ōgon no Tsuki" | 2008 | 10 | — | 30,000 | Every Best Singles: Complete |
| "Dream Goes On" | 2009 | 6 | — | 14,000 | Change |
| "Tsumetai Ame" | 2009 | 15 | — | 7,000 | Change |
| "Change" | 2010 | 16 | — | 7,000 | Change |
| "Star" | 2011 | 6 | — | 20,000 | Ordinary |
| "Moon" | 2011 | 7 | — | 20,000 | Ordinary |
| "Sora/Koe" | 2011 | 12 | — | 10,000 | Ordinary |
| "Ai ga Aru" | 2011 | 17 | 8 | 12,000 | Ordinary |
| "Landscape" | 2011 | 30 | — | 6,000 | Fun-Fare |
| "On And On" | 2013 | 18 | — | 5,000 | Fun-Fare |
| "Harinezumi no Koi" | 2013 | 16 | — | 3,000 | Fun-Fare |
| "Anata To" | 2015 | 43 | — | 2,000 | Tabitabi |
| "Kira Kira/Akari" | 2015 | 41 | — | 1,600 | non-album singles |
| "Mainichi" | 2016 | — | — | | non-album singles |
| "Ride It Out" | 2017 | — | — | | non-album singles |
| "Abite! Hikari" | 2018 | — | — | | non-album singles |

=== Other appearances ===
| Title | Year | Artist | Album |
|---|---|---|---|
| "Brave Story" | 2006 | TRF | Lif-e-Motions |
| "Thx A Lot" | 2010 | A-Nation's Party | — |

== Vinyl sets ==
- The Remixes Analog Box Set (December 19, 1997)
- The Remixes II Analog Set (June 16, 1999)

== Video albums ==
| Year | Album |
|---|---|
| 1998 | The Video Compilation: Released: March 11, 1998 (DVD: March 29, 2000); Label: Avex Trax; Formats: VHS, DVD |
| 1998 | Every Little Thing Concert Tour '98: Released: October 28, 1998 (DVD: March 29, 2000); Label: Avex Trax; Formats: VHS, DVD |
| 2000 | Rescue Me: Released: August 2, 2000; Label: Avex Trax; Formats: VHS |
| 2000 | Every Little Thing Concert Tour Spirit 2000: Released: August 30, 2000; Label: Avex Trax; Formats: VHS, DVD |
| 2001 | Ai no Kakera: Released: January 31, 2001; Label: Avex Trax; Formats: VHS, DVD |
| 2001 | The Video Compilation II: Released: March 7, 2001; Label: Avex Trax; Formats: VHS, DVD |
| 2001 | Fragile/Graceful World: Released: March 28, 2001; Label: Avex Trax; Formats: VHS, DVD |
| 2001 | Concert Tour 2001 4 Force: Released: August 27, 2001; Label: Avex Trax; Formats: VHS, DVD |
| 2002 | The Video Compilation I & II: Released: March 13, 2002; Label: Avex Trax; Formats: DVD |
| 2002 | Best Clips: Released: December 11, 2002; Label: Avex Trax; Formats: DVD |
| 2003 | Nostalgia: Released: January 1, 2003; Label: Avex Trax; Formats: DVD |
| 2003 | The Video Compilation III: Released: April 16, 2003; Label: Avex Trax; Formats: DVD |
| 2003 | Every Little Thing: 2003 Tour Many Pieces: Released: December 3, 2003; Label: Avex Trax; Formats: DVD |
| 2005 | Every Little Thing Commonplace Tour 2004 - 2005: Released: March 25, 2005; Label: Avex Trax; Formats: DVD |
| 2006 | The Video Compilation IV: Released: September 27, 2006; Label: Avex Trax; Formats: DVD |
| 2007 | Every Little Thing Concert Tour 2006-2007: Crispy Park: Released: March 7, 2007; Label: Avex Trax; Formats: DVD |
| 2007 | 10th Anniversary Special Live at Nippon Budokan: Released: August 8, 2007; Label: Avex Trax; Formats: DVD |
| 2008 | Every Little Thing Concert Tour 2008 "Door": Released: September 17, 2008; Label: Avex Trax; Formats: DVD |
| 2009 | Every Little Thing X'mas Concert 2008: Released: March 11, 2009; Label: Avex Trax; Formats: DVD |
| 2010 | Every Little Thing Concert tour 2009-2010 "Meet": Released: August 25, 2010; Label: Avex Trax; Formats: DVD |
| 2012 | Every Little Thing 15th Anniversary Concert Tour 2011-2012 "Ordinary": Released: August 1, 2012; Label: Avex Trax; Formats: DVD, Blu-ray |
| 2013 | Every Little Thing Concert Tour 2013: On a On: Released: September 25, 2013; Label: Avex Trax; Formats: DVD, Blu-ray |
| 2014 | Every Little Thing Concert Tour 2014: Fun-Fare: Released: December 17, 2014; Label: Avex Trax; Formats: DVD, Blu-ray |
| 2016 | Every Little Thing 20th Anniversary Best Hit Tour 2015-2016: Tabitabi: Released: December 14, 2016; Label: Avex Trax; Formats: DVD, Blu-ray |
| 2017 | Every Little Thing 20th Anniversary Live "The Premium Night": Arigatō: Released: February 22, 2017; Label: Avex Trax; Formats: DVD, Blu-ray |

DVD-Audio

- Every Best Single +3 (January 28, 2004)
- Koibumi/Good Night (恋文/Good Night) (December 15, 2004)
