= Tabitabi + Every Best Single 2: More Complete =

2015 studio album by Every Little Thing

Tabitabi

Studio album by Every Little Thing
- Released: September 23, 2015
- Genres: J-pop; synthpop
- Label: Avex Trax
- Producer: Masato Matsuura (exec.)

Every Little Thing chronology
Fun-Fare (2014)	Tabitabi (2015)

Singles from Tabitabi
- 1. "Anata To" Released: April 22, 2015

Every Best Single2: More Complete

Greatest hits album by Every Little Thing
- Released: September 23, 2015
- Genre: J-Pop
- Label: Avex Trax
- Producer: Max Matsuura

Every Little Thing chronology
Every Cheering Songs (2015)	Every Best Single2: More Complete (2015)

Tabitabi + Every Best Single 2: MORE COMPLETE is the twelfth studio album and second singles compilation album by Japanese music duo Every Little Thing. It was released on September 23, 2015 by Avex Trax. It reached number four on the Oricon weekly charts, and number three on the Billboard Japan Top Albums Sales.

== Release ==
This album was released in 5 versions.

- Original album(CD)
- Original+Best album(2CDs)
- Original+Best album(2CDs+DVD)
- Original+Best album(2CDs+Blu-ray)
- Original+Best album(2CDs+DVD+Blu-ray) with photobooks

== Track listing ==
=== Tabitabi ===
No.	Title	Lyrics	Music	Arranger(s)	Length
1.	"My Life"	Blaise Plant, Maynard Plant, Tax	Blaise, Maynard, Tax	Hidafumi Usami^{[a]}	5:09
2.	"Anata To" (あなたと)	Kaori Mochida, Andy Platts, Jodie May Seymour, Masaya Wada	Kaori Mochida, Andy Platts, Jodie May Seymour, Masaya Wada	Andy Platts, Jodie May Seymour, Masaya Wada	3:47
3.	"Sayonara" (さよなら)	Blaise, Maynard, Tax	Blaise, Maynard, Tax	Masafumi Nakao	4:09
4.	"Everything"	Mochida	Kunio Tago	Usami	5:23
5.	"Rainbow" (レインボー)	Chemical Volume	Chemical Volume	Chemical Volume	4:20
6.	"Iikaereba" (いいかえれば)	Mochida, Kim Sangmi, Quina Space	Mochida, Kim Sangmi, Quina Space	Kim Sangmi, Quina Space	3:36
7.	"Phone Jammming (Instrumental)"		Ichiro Ito	Yasunari "Nam-Nam" Nakamura & Ichiro Ito	2:16
8.	"Little Dancer"	Andy	Andy	Andy	4:24
9.	"Best Boyfriend"	Shinnosuke	Shinnosuke	Shinnosuke	5:14
10.	"Konoha" (このは)	Mochida	Minako Kawae	Minako Kawae	4:01
11.	"Shitamachi"	Mochida	Hidehiro Kawai	fox capture plan	3:57
12.	"Tabi Tabi" (旅旅)	Mochida	Kawae	Kawae	4:03

=== Every Best Single 2: More Complete ===
Disc 1
No.	Title	Lyrics	Music	Arranger(s)	Length
1.	"Feel My Heart"	Mitsuru Igarashi	Igarashi	Igarashi	4:25
2.	"Future World"	Igarashi	Igarashi	Igarashi	4:07
3.	"Dear My Friend"	Igarashi	Igarashi	Igarashi	3:50
4.	"For the Moment"	Igarashi	Igarashi	Igarashi	4:33
5.	"Deatta Koro no Yō ni" (出逢った頃のように)	Igarashi	Igarashi	Igarashi	4:24
6.	"Shapes of Love"	Igarashi	Igarashi	Igarashi	4:58
7.	"Never Stop!"	Kaori Mochida	Igarashi	Igarashi	4:09
8.	"Face the Change"	Igarashi	Igarashi	Igarashi	4:21
9.	"Time Goes By"	Igarashi	Igarashi	Igarashi	5:12
10.	"Forever Yours"	Igarashi	Igarashi	Igarashi	4:58
11.	"Necessary"	Igarashi	Igarashi	Igarashi	3:47
12.	"Over and Over"	Igarashi	Igarashi	Igarashi	4:44
13.	"Someday, Someplace"	Igarashi	Igarashi	Igarashi	4:32

Disc 2
No.	Title	Lyrics	Music	Arranger(s)	Length
1.	"Pray"	Igarashi	Igarashi	Igarashi	5:30
2.	"Get Into A Groove"	Igarashi	Igarashi	Igarashi	4:38
3.	"Sure"	Mochida	Every Little Thing	Every Little Thing	4:56
4.	"Rescue Me"	Igarashi	Igarashi	Igarashi	4:21
5.	"Smile Again"	Every Little Thing	Igarashi	Igarashi	4:33
6.	"Ai no Kakera" (愛のカケラ)	Mochida	Kunio Tago	Genya Kuwajima^{[b]}	4:54
7.	"Fragile"	Mochida	Kazuhito Kikuchi	Kuwajima, Kikuchi^{[b]}	4:52
8.	"Jirenma"	Mochida	Ichiro Ito	Kuwajima	4:27
9.	"Graceful World"	Mochida	Y@suo Ohtani	Kuwajima, Ohtani^{[b]}	5:11
10.	"Jump"	Mochida	Mochida	Akira Murata	4:07
11.	"Kioku" (キヲク)	Mochida	Kikuchi	Murata^{[a]}	5:26
12.	"Sasayaka na Inori" (ささやかな祈り)	Mochida	Tago	Expo^{[a]}	4:55

Disc 3
No.	Title	Lyrics	Music	Arranger(s)	Length
1.	"Unspeakable"	Mochida	Kikuchi	Ohtani, Masafumi Nakao^{[b]}	4:24
2.	"Ai no Uta" (愛の謳)	Mochida	Tago	Murata	4:52
3.	"Room" (ルーム)	Mochida	Kikuchi	Nakao, Ohtani^{[b]}	4:33
4.	"Nostalgia"	Mochida	Kikuchi	Tasuku^{[b]}	5:49
5.	"Grip!"	Mochida	Kazuhiro Hara	HΛL	4:51
6.	"Fundamental Love" (ファンダメンタル・ラブ)	Mochida	Tago	Tasuku^{[b]}	4:17
7.	"Mata Ashita" (また あした)	Mochida	Hideyuki Obata	Tomoji Sogawa^{[a]}	4:58
8.	"Ichinichi no Hajimari ni..." (一日の始まりに...)	Mochida	Hikari	Hikari^{[a]}	4:42
9.	"Shiawase no Fūkei" (しあわせの風景)	Mochida	Kikuchi	Nakao^{[b]}	5:06
10.	"Soraai" (ソラアイ)	Mochida	Hikari	Hikari^{[b]}	5:13
11.	"Koibumi" (恋文)	Mochida	Hikari	Hikari^{[a]}	5:01
12.	"Good Night"	Mochida	Hikari	Hikari^{[b]}	4:57

Disc 4
No.	Title	Lyrics	Music	Arranger(s)	Length
1.	"Kimi no Te" (きみの て)	Mochida	Hikari	Hikari^{[a]}	4:50
2.	"Azure Moon"	Mochida	Hikari	Hikari^{[a]}	5:24
3.	"Hi-Fi Message" (ハイファイ メッセージ)	Mochida	Hikari	Hikari^{[a]}	5:29
4.	"Swimmy" (スイミー)	Mochida	Daichi Hayakawa	Yasunari "Nam-Nam" Nakamura^{[a]}	4:59
5.	"Kirameki Hour" (キラメキアワー)	Mochida	Tago	Masafumi "Massy" Hayashi^{[a]}	4:35
6.	"Koi o Shiteiru" (恋をしている)	Mochida	Kikuchi	Nakamura^{[a]}	5:23
7.	"Fuyu ga Hajimaru yo" (冬がはじまるよ) (feat. Noriyuki Makihara)	Noriyuki Makihara	Makihara	Hayashi^{[a]}	4:33
8.	"Sakurabito" (サクラビト)	Mochida	Tago	Sogawa^{[a]}	5:00
9.	"Atarashii Hibi" (あたらしい日々)	Mochida	Eriko Yoshiki	Nakamura^{[a]}	4:16
10.	"Ōgon no Tsuki" (黄金の月)	Mochida	Mochida	Seiji Kameda^{[a]}	4:56
11.	"Dream Goes On"	Mochida	Igarashi	Igarashi^{[a]}	4:29
12.	"Tsumetai Ame" (冷たい雨)	Mochida	Igarashi	Igarashi^{[a]}	4:42

Disc 5
No.	Title	Lyrics	Music	Arranger(s)	Length
1.	"Change"	Mochida	Igarashi	Igarashi^{[a]}	4:49
2.	"STAR"	Mochida	Hikari	Hikari^{[a]}	4:59
3.	"MOON"	Mochida	Daichi Suzuki	Hikari^{[a]}	4:27
4.	"Sora" (宙 -そら-)	Mochida	Kikuchi	Masafumi Nakao, Every Little Thing^{[a]}	5:16
5.	"Koe" (響 -こえ-)	Mochida	Kikuchi	Sogawa, Every Little Thing^{[a]}	4:45
6.	"Ai ga Aru" (アイガアル)	Mochida	Hikari	Hikari, Every Little Thing^{[a]}	4:05
7.	"Landscape"	Mochida	Hikari	Hikari, Every Little Thing^{[a]}	4:22
8.	"On And On"	Mochida	Hikari	Hikari, Every Little Thing^{[a]}	4:13
9.	"Harinezumi no Koi" (ハリネズミの恋)	Mochida	Tago	Murata, Every Little Thing^{[a]}	3:30
10.	"Start"	Mochida	Hikari	Hikari, Every Little Thing^{[a]}	4:00
11.	"Run For"	Mochida	Junichi Hoshino		3:45

== Charts ==
Chart (2015)	Peak position
Japan (Oricon Weekly Albums Chart)	4
Japan (Billboard Top Albums Sales)	3
