= Every Best Single: Complete =

Greatest hits album by Every Little Thing
- Released: December 23, 2009
- Genre: J-pop
- Label: Avex Trax
- Producer: Max Matsuura

Every Little Thing chronology
Door (2008)	Every Best Single: Complete (2009)	Change (2010)

Every Best Single: Complete is a singles compilation by the Japanese duo Every Little Thing, released on December 23, 2009, through Avex Trax.

== Background ==
A set of four CDs and two DVDs, this album is the first to include all their singles from their debut to that time, and also the first time the band includes all their music videos in one DVD release. An encore press of the album was released on March 3, 2010.

The only new song in the album is a remix of the band's 1998 hit "Time Goes By" made by Kenji "Kj" Furuya of Dragon Ash.

== Chart performance ==
The album peaked at number four on the Oricon Weekly Album Charts, it stayed in the charts for 24 weeks and was the 43rd best-selling album of 2010 in Japan.

== Track listing ==
Disc 1
No.	Title	Lyrics	Music	Arranger(s)	Length
1.	"Feel My Heart"	Mitsuru Igarashi	Igarashi	Igarashi	4:25
2.	"Future World"	Igarashi	Igarashi	Igarashi	4:07
3.	"Dear My Friend"	Igarashi	Igarashi	Igarashi	3:50
4.	"For the Moment"	Igarashi	Igarashi	Igarashi	4:33
5.	"Deatta Koro no Yō ni" (出逢った頃のように)	Igarashi	Igarashi	Igarashi	4:24
6.	"Shapes of Love"	Igarashi	Igarashi	Igarashi	4:58
7.	"Never Stop!"	Kaori Mochida	Igarashi	Igarashi	4:09
8.	"Face the Change"	Igarashi	Igarashi	Igarashi	4:21
9.	"Time Goes By"	Igarashi	Igarashi	Igarashi	5:12
10.	"Forever Yours"	Igarashi	Igarashi	Igarashi	4:58
11.	"Necessary"	Igarashi	Igarashi	Igarashi	3:47
12.	"Over and Over"	Igarashi	Igarashi	Igarashi	4:44
13.	"Someday, Someplace"	Igarashi	Igarashi	Igarashi	4:32

Disc 2
No.	Title	Lyrics	Music	Arranger(s)	Length
1.	"Pray"	Igarashi	Igarashi	Igarashi	5:30
2.	"Get Into A Groove"	Igarashi	Igarashi	Igarashi	4:38
3.	"Sure"	Mochida	Every Little Thing	Every Little Thing	4:56
4.	"Rescue Me"	Igarashi	Igarashi	Igarashi	4:21
5.	"Smile Again"	Every Little Thing	Igarashi	Igarashi	4:33
6.	"Ai no Kakera" (愛のカケラ)	Mochida	Kunio Tago	Genya Kuwajima^{[b]}	4:54
7.	"Fragile"	Mochida	Kazuhito Kikuchi	Kuwajima, Kikuchi^{[b]}	4:52
8.	"Jirenma"	Mochida	Ichiro Ito	Kuwajima	4:27
9.	"Graceful World"	Mochida	Y@suo Ohtani	Kuwajima, Ohtani^{[b]}	5:11
10.	"Jump"	Mochida	Mochida	Akira Murata	4:07
11.	"Kioku" (キヲク)	Mochida	Kikuchi	Murata^{[a]}	5:26
12.	"Sasayaka na Inori" (ささやかな祈り)	Mochida	Tago	Expo^{[a]}	4:55

Disc 3
No.	Title	Lyrics	Music	Arranger(s)	Length
1.	"Unspeakable"	Mochida	Kikuchi	Ohtani, Masafumi Nakao^{[b]}	4:24
2.	"Ai no Uta" (愛の謳)	Mochida	Tago	Murata	4:52
3.	"Room" (ルーム)	Mochida	Kikuchi	Nakao, Ohtani^{[b]}	4:33
4.	"Nostalgia"	Mochida	Kikuchi	Tasuku^{[b]}	5:49
5.	"Grip!"	Mochida	Kazuhiro Hara	HΛL	4:51
6.	"Fundamental Love" (ファンダメンタル・ラブ)	Mochida	Tago	Tasuku^{[b]}	4:17
7.	"Mata Ashita" (また あした)	Mochida	Hideyuki Obata	Tomoji Sogawa^{[a]}	4:58
8.	"Ichinichi no Hajimari ni..." (一日の始まりに...)	Mochida	Hikari	Hikari^{[a]}	4:42
9.	"Shiawase no Fūkei" (しあわせの風景)	Mochida	Kikuchi	Nakao^{[b]}	5:06
10.	"Soraai" (ソラアイ)	Mochida	Hikari	Hikari^{[b]}	5:13
11.	"Koibumi" (恋文)	Mochida	Hikari	Hikari^{[a]}	5:01
12.	"Good Night"	Mochida	Hikari	Hikari^{[b]}	4:57

Disc 4
No.	Title	Lyrics	Music	Arranger(s)	Length
1.	"Kimi no Te" (きみの て)	Mochida	Hikari	Hikari^{[a]}	4:50
2.	"Azure Moon"	Mochida	Hikari	Hikari^{[a]}	5:24
3.	"Hi-Fi Message" (ハイファイ メッセージ)	Mochida	Hikari	Hikari^{[a]}	5:29
4.	"Swimmy" (スイミー)	Mochida	Daichi Hayakawa	Yasunari "Nam-Nam" Nakamura^{[a]}	4:59
5.	"Kirameki Hour" (キラメキアワー)	Mochida	Tago	Masafumi "Massy" Hayashi^{[a]}	4:35
6.	"Koi o Shiteiru" (恋をしている)	Mochida	Kikuchi	Nakamura^{[a]}	5:23
7.	"Fuyu ga Hajimaru yo" (冬がはじまるよ) (feat. Noriyuki Makihara)	Noriyuki Makihara	Makihara	Hayashi^{[a]}	4:33
8.	"Sakurabito" (サクラビト)	Mochida	Tago	Sogawa^{[a]}	5:00
9.	"Atarashii Hibi" (あたらしい日々)	Mochida	Eriko Yoshiki	Nakamura^{[a]}	4:16
10.	"Ōgon no Tsuki" (黄金の月)	Mochida	Mochida	Seiji Kameda^{[a]}	4:56
11.	"Dream Goes On"	Mochida	Igarashi	Igarashi^{[a]}	4:29
12.	"Tsumetai Ame" (冷たい雨)	Mochida	Igarashi	Igarashi^{[a]}	4:42
13.	"Time Goes By (As Time Goes By)" (KJ Mix)	Igarashi	Igarashi	Kj	5:27

DVD 1
No.	Title	Length
1.	"Feel My Heart"
2.	"Future World"
3.	"Dear My Friend"
4.	"For the Moment"
5.	"Deatta Koro no Yō ni" (出逢った頃のように)
6.	"Shapes of Love"
7.	"Time Goes By"
8.	"Forever Yours" (Short ver.)
9.	"Necessary"
10.	"Over and Over"
11.	"Someday, Someplace"
12.	"Pray"
13.	"Sure"
14.	"Rescue Me"
15.	"Ai no Kakera" (愛のカケラ)
16.	"Fragile"
17.	"Graceful World"
18.	"Jump"
19.	"Kiwoku" (キヲク)

DVD 2
No.	Title	Length
1.	"Sasayaka na Inori" (ささやかな祈り)
2.	"Unspeakable"
3.	"Nostalgia"
4.	"Grip!"
5.	"Fundamental Love" (ファンダメンタル・ラブ)
6.	"Mata Ashita" (また あした)
7.	"Soraai" (ソラアイ)
8.	"Koibumi" (恋文)
9.	"Good Night"
10.	"Kimi no Te" (きみの て)
11.	"Azure Moon"
12.	"Hi-Fi Message" (ハイファイ メッセージ)
13.	"Swimmy" (スイミー)
14.	"Kirameki Hour" (キラメキアワー)
15.	"Koi o Shiteiru" (恋をしている)
16.	"Sakurabito" (サクラビト)
17.	"Atarashii Hibi" (あたらしい日々)
18.	"Dream Goes On"
19.	"Tsumetai Ame" (冷たい雨) (Music Clip ver.)
20.	"Behind The "Meet" Volume 00"

Notes

- ^{^a} co-arranged by Every Little Thing
- ^{^b} co-arranged by Ichiro Ito

== Personnel ==
- Directed By – Satoshi Shirota
- Executive Producer – Max Matsuura
- Mastered By – Yasuji Maeda
- String arrangements – Tatsuya Murayama

== Charts ==
Release	Chart	Peak position	Sales total
December 23, 2009	Oricon Weekly Albums Chart	4	173,351 copies sold
