= Acoustic: Latte =

Studio album by Every Little Thing
- Released: February 16, 2005
- Genres: J-pop, acoustic
- Length: 61:17
- Label: Avex Trax
- Producer: Max Matsuura (exec.)

Every Little Thing chronology
Commonplace (2004)	Acoustic: Latte (2005)	Crispy Park (2006)

Acoustic: Latte is a compilation album by the Japanese pop rock group Every Little Thing, released on February 16, 2005. It peaked at number 4 on the Oricon weekly albums chart.

CD== Track listing ==
No.	Title	Lyrics	Music	Arranger(s)	Length
1.	"Forever Yours"	Mitsuru Igarashi	Igarashi	Yasunari Nakamura	4:56
2.	"Water(s)"	Kaori Mochida	Daichi Hayakawa	Nakamura	3:41
3.	"Nostalgia"	Mochida	Kazuhito Kikuchi	Nakamura^{[a]}	5:59
4.	"Ai no Kakera" (愛のカケラ)	Mochida	Kunio Tago	Ichiro Ito, Kaoru Kato	5:23
5.	"Time Goes By"	Igarashi	Igarashi	Nakamura^{[a]}	5:53
6.	"Sasayaka na Inori" (ささやかな祈り)	Mochida	Tago	Masafumi Hayashi	5:01
7.	"Shiawase no Fūkei" (しあわせの風景)	Mochida	Kikuchi	Ito	4:32
8.	"Fragile"	Mochida	Kikuchi	Nakamura^{[a]}	6:07
9.	"Azayaka na Mono" (鮮やかなもの)	Mochida	Tago	Nakamura^{[a]}	4:19
10.	"Necessary"	Igarashi	Igarashi	Nakamura	4:46
11.	"Ai no Uta" (愛の謳)	Mochida	Tago	Hayashi	5:55
12.	"Over and Over"	Igarashi	Igarashi	Hayashi	4:55

Limited edition DVD
No.	Title	Length
1.	"Recording Scene"
2.	"Special Interview"
3.	"Every Little Thing Commonplace Tour 2004-2005 Digest"

Notes

- ^{^a} Additional arrangement by Shinji Tanahashi.

== Charts ==
Release	Chart	Peak position	Sales total	Chart run
February 16, 2005	Oricon Daily Albums Chart			
February 16, 2005	Oricon Weekly Albums Chart	4	136,553 copies sold	12 weeks
February 16, 2005	Oricon Yearly Albums Chart			
