= 14 Message: Every Ballad Songs 2 =

- Cover to the standard edition of the album

Greatest hits album by Every Little Thing
- Released: February 14, 2007
- Genre: J-pop
- Label: AVEX Trax

Every Little Thing chronology
Crispy Park (2006)	14 Message: Every Ballad Songs 2 (2007)	Door (2008)

CD + Photobook
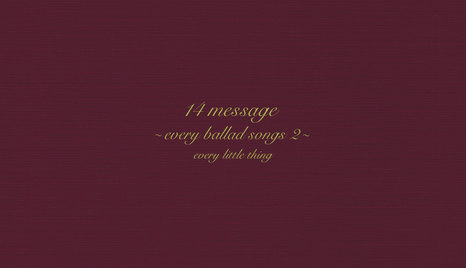
- The cover of the 14 Message: Every Ballad Songs 2 Limited version.

14 Message: Every Ballad Songs 2 is the fourth best of album by the Japanese pop group Every Little Thing, released on February 14, 2007.

== Track listing ==
All lyrics are written by Kaori Mochida.

CD
No.	Title	Music	Arranger(s)	Length
1.	"Unspeakable"	Kazuhito Kikuchi	Y@suo Ohtani, Masafumi Nakao^{[b]}	4:22
2.	"Kioku" (キヲク)	Kikuchi	Akira Murata^{[a]}	5:25
3.	"Ame no Naru Yoru, Shizuku wo Kimi ni" (雨の鳴る夜、しずくを君に)	Kunio Tago	Tomoji Sogawa^{[a]}	5:04
4.	"Soraai" (ソラアイ)	Hikari	Hikari^{[b]}	5:12
5.	"Nostalgia"	Kikuchi	Tasuku^{[b]}	5:49
6.	"Shiawase no Fūkei" (しあわせの風景)	Kikuchi	Nakao^{[b]}	5:05
7.	"Azure Moon"	Hikari	Hikari^{[a]}	5:24
8.	"Room" (ルーム)	Kikuchi	Ohtani, Nakao^{[b]}	5:03
9.	"Koibumi" (恋文)	Hikari	Hikari^{[a]}	5:02
10.	"Samidare" (五月雨)	Kunio Tago	Nakao^{[b]}	5:13
11.	"Kaerimichi" (帰り道)	Tetsuhiko	Sogawa^{[b]}	5:24
12.	"Good Night"	Hikari	Hikari^{[b]}	4:58
13.	"Mata Ashita" (また あした)	Hideyuki Obata	Sogawa^{[a]}	5:00
14.	"Ai no Uta" (愛の謳)	Tago	Murata^{[a]}	4:52

Notes

- ^{^a} co-arranged by Every Little Thing
- ^{^b} co-arranged by Ichiro Ito

== Charts ==
Release	Chart	Peak position
February 14, 2007	Oricon Daily Albums Chart	1
February 14, 2007	Oricon Weekly Albums Chart	2
February 14, 2007	Taiwan J-Pop Chart	5
