= Cyber Trance presents ELT Trance =

Remix album by Every Little Thing
- Released: February 27, 2002
- Genres: J-pop; trance
- Length: 63:04
- Label: Avex Trance

Every Little Thing chronology
| Every Ballad Songs (2001) | Cyber Trance presents ELT Trance (2002) | Many Pieces (2003) |

Cyber Trance presents ELT Trance is the first trance music remix album by Japanese duo Every Little Thing. It was released simultaneously with the house remixes compilation The Remixes III: Mix Rice Plantation on February 27, 2002, by Avex Trance. The album contains remixes of tracks from their first four studio albums from Everlasting to 4 Force.

All the remixes included in the album are edit versions. As of 2014, the original extended or alternate versions of the tracks remain unreleased, except for Airwave's "Fragile", Svenson & Gielen's "Dear My Friend" extended club versions, and DJ Balloon's "Shapes of Love (Dub Mix)" and "Rescue Me (JamX & De Leon's DuMonde Instrumental Mix)", which were included in Avex's miscellaneous compilations.

== Track listing ==
| No. | Title | Remixer(s) | Length |
|---|---|---|---|
| 1. | "Future World" (Mike Koglin Remix) | Mike Koglin | 3:48 |
| 2. | "Someday, Someplace" (Dave 202 & Phil Green remix) | Dave 202; Phil Green | 4:06 |
| 3. | "Fragile" (Airwave Remix) | Airwave | 4:36 |
| 4. | "Face the Change" (Dirt Devils vs. Above & Beyond Remix) | Dirt Devils; Above & Beyond | 3:38 |
| 5. | "Rescue Me" (JamX & De Leon's DuMonde remix) | DuMonde; JamX; De Leon | 4:55 |
| 6. | "Forever Yours" (VooDoo & Serano Remix) | VooDoo & Serano | 3:49 |
| 7. | "Time Goes By" (Darren Tate Remix) | Darren Tate | 4:51 |
| 8. | "Deatta Koro no Yō ni" (出逢った頃のように) (Micro Tools known as Plastic Angel Remix) | Plastic Angel | 4:43 |
| 9. | "Pray" (Quo Vadis Remix) | Quo Vadis | 4:26 |
| 10. | "For the Moment" (System F Remix) | Ferry Corsten | 3:17 |
| 11. | "Shapes of Love" (DJ Balloon Remix) | DJ Balloon | 4:08 |
| 12. | "Ai no Kakera" (愛のカケラ) (Vincent de Moor remix) | Vincent de Moor | 5:03 |
| 13. | "Dear My Friend" (Svenson & Gielen Remix) | Svenson & Gielen | 5:03 |
| 14. | "Feel My Heart" (Moogwai Remix) | Moogwai | 3:49 |
| 15. | "Over and Over" (Chris Coco Remix) | Chris Coco | 4:34 |
| Total length: | | | 63:04 |

== Personnel ==
- Audio mastering: Hiroyuki Hosaka
- A&R: Nobby Uno
- Assistant Direction: Hidetomo Yoneda, Tomohiro Kinukawa
- Coordination In Europe: Satoshi Uetake
- Coordination: Akiko Inoue, Cooney Kotani, Naoko Miura
- Executive Supervisor: Shinji Hayashi
- Special Coordination: Tom Yoda
- Supervisor: Hidemi Arasaki, Katsuro Oshita, Shig Fujita

== Charts ==
| Chart (2002) | Peak position |
|---|---|
| Japan Oricon | 16 |
