= Change (Every Little Thing album) =

Studio album by Every Little Thing
- Released: March 24, 2010
- Genres: J-pop; synthpop
- Length: 50:07
- Label: Avex Trax
- Producer: Masato Matsuura (exec.)

Every Little Thing chronology
Every Best Singles: Complete (2009)	Change (2010)	Ordinary (2011)

Singles from Change
- 1. "Dream Goes On" Released: September 23, 2009; 2. "Tsumetai Ame" Released: November 18, 2009; 3. "Change" Released: February 24, 2010

Change is the ninth album of the Japanese pop rock group Every Little Thing, released on March 24, 2010.

== Background information ==
The band's 36th single "Dream Goes On", was released on September 23, 2009, and marked a highlight as the return of Mitsuru Igarashi working with the band after 9 years. Igarashi had major involvement in the recording of the album; he composed most of its songs, and co-arranged all songs along with Mochida and Ito (minus the instrumentals). As for lyrics, he also wrote "Spearmint", which was previously included as a b-side of "Dream Goes On".

== Track listing ==
CD
No.	Title	Lyrics	Music	Arranger(s)	Length
1.	"Change"	Kaori Mochida	Mitsuru Igarashi	Igarashi^{[a]}	4:49
2.	"Aoi Kirameki" (青い煌めき; Blue gleam)	Igarashi	Igarashi	Igarashi^{[a]}	4:28
3.	"Spearmint"	Igarashi	Igarashi	Igarashi^{[a]}	4:37
4.	"Wasureenu Hito" (忘れえぬ人; Unforgettable person)	Mochida	Kazuhito Kikuchi	Yuta Nakano^{[a]}	5:14
5.	"Jūnikagetsu" (12ヶ月; 12 months)	Igarashi	Kikuchi	Nakano^{[a]}	5:02
6.	"Heart Rate Of The City" (Instrumental)		Ichiro Ito	Yasunari Nakamura^{[b]}	1:05
7.	"Mayonaka no Highway" (真夜中のハイウェイ, Midnight highway)	Mochida	Igarashi	Igarashi^{[a]}	4:47
8.	"Dream Goes On"	Mochida	Igarashi	Igarashi^{[a]}	4:29
9.	"Sketchbook" (スケッチブック)	Igarashi	Igarashi	Igarashi^{[a]}	4:10
10.	"Snowscape" (Instrumental)		Ito	Nakamura^{[b]}	2:05
11.	"Ren" (蓮 -れん-; Lotus)	Mochida	Igarashi	Igarashi^{[a]}	4:41
12.	"Tsumetai Ame" (冷たい雨; Cold rain) (Album version)	Mochida	Igarashi	Igarashi^{[a]}, String & Woodwind instrument arrangement: Ittetsu Gen	4:40

DVD
No.	Title	Length
1.	"Dream Goes On" (Music Video)	4:50
2.	"Dream Goes On" (Off Shot)	3:56
3.	"Tsumetai Ame -Music Clip ver.-" (Music Video)	3:49
4.	"Change" (Music Video)	4:32
5.	"Change" (Off Shot)	3:54
6.	"Silent Night" (from Premium Xmas Concert 2009)	2:20
7.	"Koi wo Shiteiru" (from Premium Xmas Concert 2009)	4:23
8.	"Swimmy" (from Premium Xmas Concert 2009)	3:23
9.	"Behind The "Meet" Volume 01"

Notes

- ^{^a} co-arranged by Every Little Thing
- ^{^b} co-arranged by Ichiro Ito

== Charts ==
Release	Chart	Peak position	Sales total
March 24, 2010	Oricon Daily Albums Chart	2	
March 24, 2010	Oricon Weekly Albums Chart	8	31,406 copies sold
