= Commonplace (album) =

Studio album by Every Little Thing
- Released: March 10, 2004
- Genres: J-pop; soft rock; pop rock
- Length: 50:36
- Label: Avex Trax
- Producer: Masato "Max" Matsuura (exec.)

Every Little Thing chronology
Every Best Single 2 (2003)	Commonplace (2004)	Acoustic : Latte (2005)

Singles from Commonplace
- 1. "Fundamental Love" Released: July 30, 2003; 2. "Mata Ashita" Released: November 12, 2003; 3. "Ichinichi no Hajimari ni..." Released: November 12, 2003; 4. "Shiawase no Fūkei" Released: November 12, 2003; 5. "Soraai" Released: February 25, 2004

Commonplace is the sixth album of the Japanese band Every Little Thing, released on March 10, 2004 by Avex Trax. It peaked at number 1 on the Oricon Albums Chart.

== Background ==
The album contains mainly soft rock and acoustic sounds. All the lyrics were written by Kaori Mochida, except for the song "Country Road", which is the duo's first song that sang completely in English. Gary Newby of British band The Railway Children wrote the English lyrics for "Country Road".

The album was released in a regular CD only version and a limited edition with a bonus DVD. The multimedia material includes behind the scenes shots from the album cover photo shoot, and live footage from an acoustic Christmas concert performed in 2003.

== Track listing ==
All lyrics are written by Kaori Mochida, except track 5 (translated into English by Gary Newby) and secret track in track 12 (written by Ichiro Ito).

CD
No.	Title	Music	Arranger(s)	Length
1.	"Soraai" (ソラアイ; Weather)	Hikari	Hikari^{[b]}	05:11
2.	"Fundamental Love" (ファンダメンタル・ラブ)	Kunio Tago	Tasuku^{[b]}	04:18
3.	"Water(s)"	Daichi Hayakawa	Akira Murata^{[b]}	03:59
4.	"Shiawase no Fūkei" (しあわせの風景; Scenery of Happiness)	Kazuhito Kikuchi	Masafumi Nakao^{[b]}	05:07
5.	"Country Road"	Ichiro Ito	Murata^{[b]}	04:42
6.	"Ichinichi no Hajimari ni..." (一日の始まりに...; At the beginning of the day...)	Hikari	Hikari^{[a]}	04:43
7.	"Life Cycle"	Hikari	Hikari^{[b]}	04:05
8.	"Ura Urara" (うらうらら)	Kaori Mochida	Murata^{[a]}	04:09
9.	"Mata Ashita" (また あした; See you tomorrow)	Hideyuki Obata	Tomoji Sogawa^{[a]}	05:00
10.	"Interluido - Meridiana" (Instrumental)	Ichiro Ito	Yasunari Nakamura^{[b]}	01:39
11.	"Samidare" (五月雨, Early summer rain) (includes secret track "Sleepy Time Dog")	Tago	Nakao^{[b]}	07:49

DVD
No.	Title	Length
1.	"Commonplace" (Photo Session Scene)
2.	"Time Goes By" (20031224 version)

Notes

- ^{^a} co-arranged by Every Little Thing
- ^{^b} co-arranged by Ichiro Ito

== Charts ==
Release	Chart	Peak position	Sales total
March 3, 2004	Oricon Daily Albums Chart	1	
March 3, 2004	Oricon Weekly Albums Chart	1	313,647 copies sold
