= Ordinary (album) =

Studio album by Every Little Thing
- Released: September 21, 2011
- Recorded: 2011
- Genre: J-pop; synthpop
- Length: 58:38
- Label: Avex Trax
- Producer: Masato Matsuura (exec.)

Every Little Thing chronology
Change (2010)	Ordinary (2011)	Fun-Fare (2014)

Singles from Ordinary
- 1. "Star" Released: February 23, 2011; 2. "Moon" Released: February 23, 2011; 3. "Sora/Koe" Released: July 13, 2011; 4. "Ai ga Aru" Released: August 24, 2011

Ordinary is the tenth studio album by Japanese music duo Every Little Thing. It was released on September 21, 2011, by Avex Trax.

== Background ==
To celebrate the 15th anniversary of the band in the music industry, the album was released in three formats: CD, DVD+DVD and a special CD+DVD edition.

The album includes the single "Sora/Koe", which was used as theme songs for the 2011 Pokémon movie: Black—Victini and Reshiram/White—Victini and Zekrom. The last single from the album, entitled "Ai ga Aru", was used as theme song for TV drama Full Throttle Girl (Zenkai Girl). Also, for promotional purposes the songs "Tomorrow", "Ordinary" and "Begin" were used in adverts for H.I.S., Kracie and The Japan Jewellery Association, respectively.

== Track listing ==
All lyrics are written by Kaori Mochida

CD
No.	Title	Music	Arranger(s)	Length
1.	"Ai ga Aru" (アイガアル)	Hikari	Hikari^{[a]}	4:03
2.	"Tomorrow"	Hikari	Hikari^{[a]}	4:08
3.	"Sora" (宙 -そら-)	Kazuhito Kikuchi	Masafumi Nakao^{[a]}	5:14
4.	"Kūhaku" (空白)	Shinjiro Inoue	Shinjiro Inoue^{[a]}	5:53
5.	"Moon"	Daisuke Suzuki	Yuta Nakano^{[a]}	4:24
6.	"Wonder Love"	Hirofumi Hibino	Masafumi Hayashi^{[a]}	4:05
7.	"Star"	Hikari	Hikari^{[a]}	4:57
8.	"Asian Beauty" (Instrumental)	Ichiro Ito	Masafumi Nakao^{[b]}	1:47
9.	"Koe" (響 -こえ-)	Kazuhito Kikuchi	Tomoji Sogawa^{[a]}	4:44
10.	"Arigatō wa Sono Tame ni Aru" (ありがとうはそのためにある)	Takuya Watanabe	Akira Murata^{[a]}	4:16
11.	"Ordinary"	Kazuhito Kikuchi	Masafumi Nakao^{[a]}	5:14
12.	"Pray For East" (Instrumental)	Ichiro Ito	Masafumi Nakao^{[b]}	2:38
13.	"Begin"	Yasuo Sano	Masafumi Nakao^{[a]}	6:38

DVD (standard edition)
No.	Title	Length
1.	"Star" (Music video)
2.	"Moon" (Music video)
3.	"Sora" (Music video - Original version)
4.	"Ai ga Aru" (Music video - Album version)
5.	"Sora" (Offshoot)
6.	"Ai ga Aru" (Offshoot)
7.	"Begin" (Offshoot)

DVD (15th Anniversary Special Edition)
No.	Title	Length
1.	"Star" (Music video)
2.	"Moon" (Music video)
3.	"Sora" (Music video - Original version)
4.	"Ai ga Aru" (Music video - Album version)
5.	"15th Anniversary Special History Movie"

Notes

- ^{^a} co-arranged by Every Little Thing
- ^{^b} co-arranged by Ichiro Ito

== Charts ==
Release	Chart	Peak position	Sales total
September 21, 2011	Oricon Weekly Albums Chart	2	37,580 copies sold
