= 4 Force =

Studio album by Every Little Thing
- Released: March 22, 2001
- Genre: Pop rock, J-pop
- Length: 51:40
- Label: Avex Trax
- Producer: Every Little Thing

Every Little Thing chronology
Eternity (2000)	4 Force (2001)	Super Eurobeat presents Euro Every Little Thing (2001)

Singles from 4 Force
- 1. "Ai no Kakera (愛のカケラ)" Released: October 18, 2000; 2. "Fragile/Jirenma" Released: January 1, 2001; 3. "Graceful World" Released: February 21, 2001

4 Force is the fourth album from the Japanese pop rock group Every Little Thing, released on March 22, 2001.

This is the first album from Every Little Thing without their former keyboardist, Mitsuru Igarashi, who left in April 2000 to produce songs of other artists, like Dream and the now disbanded day after tomorrow. In his wake, vocalist Kaori Mochida took over lyric writing, while guitarist Ichirō Itō and a host of additional musicians handled music composition and arrangement.

== Track listing ==
All lyrics are written by Kaori Mochida.

CD
No.	Title	Music	Arranger(s)	Length
1.	"Graceful World"	Yasuo Ohtani	Yasuo Ohtani, Genya Kuwajima
2.	"Jirenma" (Album Mix)	Ichiro Ito	Ichiro Ito, Genya Kuwajima
3.	"Ai no Kakera (愛のカケラ, ; Fragment of Love)"	Kunio Tago	Ichiro Ito, Genya Kuwajima
4.	"Good For Nothing"	Kaori Mochida	Genya Kuwajima
5.	"Azayaka na Mono (鮮やかなもの)"	Kunio Tago	Genya Kuwajima
6.	"Sweetaholic Girl"	Kaori Mochida	Genya Kuwajima
7.	"Home Sweet Home"	Kazuhiro Hara	Genya Kuwajima, Yasuhiko Hoshino
8.	"Fragile"	Kazuhito Kikuchi	Ichiro Ito, Genya Kuwajima, Kazuhito Kikuchi
9.	"No Limit"	D.A.I	Akira Murata
10.	"Force of Heart"	Ichiro Ito	Genya Kuwajima
11.	"One"	D.A.I	Genya Kuwajima

== Charts ==
Release	Chart	Peak position	Sales total
22 March 2001	Oricon Weekly Albums Chart	2	440,520
22 March 2001	Oricon Yearly Albums Chart	26	847,000
