= Ainori =

Television program

- logo
- あいのり
- Narrated by: Yūji Machi
- Country of origin: Japan
- Original language: Japanese

Production
- Production company: Fuji Television

Original release
- Network: FNS (Fuji TV)
- Release: October 11, 1999 – March 23, 2009

Ainori (あいのり), literally "love ride" but can also be read "ride together" or "car pool", is a popular television program that runs Monday evenings from 11 pm in Japan on Fuji TV. It debuted on October 11, 1999. The show originally ended on March 23, 2009 but returned under the name "Ainori 2" on December 25, 2010, running through April 30, 2011.

Ainori was revived by Fuji TV and Netflix beginning with Asian Journey, which was first broadcast on the streaming platform in November 2017 and on Fuji TV in January 2018. Both media outlets also aired the second season of Asian Journey as well as the first season of African Journey, which was available on Netflix in late 2019 and on Fuji TV in early 2020.

== Description ==
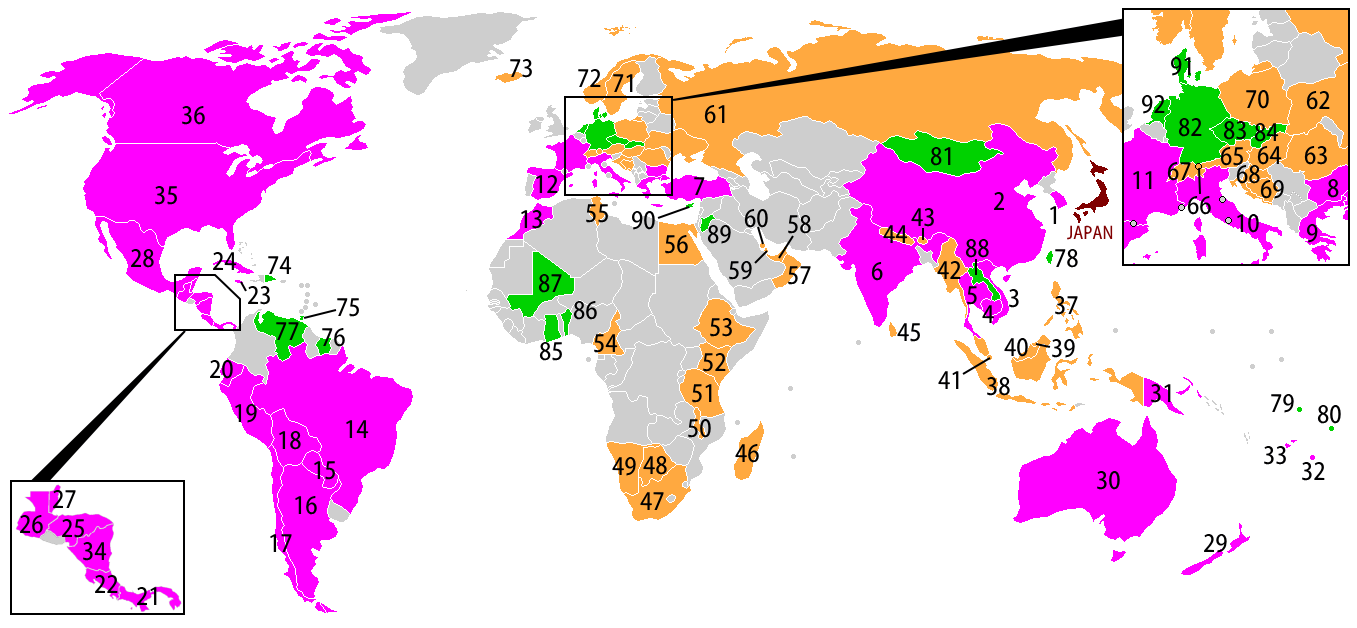
Countries visited on Ainori

Ainori is a reality program where seven young men and women travel the world riding a pink bus nicknamed the "Love Wagon". The program is reminiscent of a travelogue; as of December 2008, the show has followed the bus across 90 countries as participants explore both famous tourist attractions and more off-the-beaten-path places. The participants are led across each country by a native who serves as tour guide, bus driver, and friend. Upon reaching the border with another country, the bus stops and participants head out to their next destination country to meet their new tour guide and get into their new bus.

The show's twist is that the participants are each young, single people whose goal is to find love with another participant and return to Japan as a couple. When a participant has decided they like someone else, they ask the driver for a ticket back to Japan. They then declare their love to the object of their affection, and ask that the two return to Japan together. After a night's consideration, the person who received the love declaration can either answer with a kiss, after which both participants leave the bus for Japan. Otherwise, the jilted participant is left to return to Japan alone. Besides the love declaration, participants are forbidden from talking openly about their love interests with other participants, but inform the TV audience of their feelings through diaries and confessions to the camera (shot when no other participants are present).

After people leave the bus, new people are added to the program, to keep the total at 7 members. They are seen on the side of the road with a painted cardboard sign (appearing to be hitchhikers) and brought aboard after a self-introduction.

The First Lap Around the World ended in May, 2003, and the Second Lap ended in March, 2007. After that, the bus visits the countries which has never been visited on the show, without the route. The 400th episode was aired on May 5, 2008.

As of March, 2009, 44 couples have found love through the program, and there have been 8 marriages (though one couple has divorced). On March 1, 2005, the first "Ainori Baby" was born, and as of mid-2008 there have been 4 babies born in total. Although typically the couples are "born" on their world trip, in the summer of 2006, two separate couples (Goki/Outlaw and MIE/Susan) were formed after the participants returned to Japan and realized their feelings for each other there, and in February 2007, an "Ainori news special" told the story of another couple (Hide/Kayo) who got together after returning to Japan.

To help prevent relationships between the staff and the participants, only staff members who are married or are already involved are chosen to work on the show. Songs such as ELT's "Fragile", Glay's "Way of Difference", and I WiSH's "ashita e no tobira" are used as the main theme music

== Countries visited ==
=== The First Lap ===
#	Country	Air date	Participants		Couples
#	Country	Air date	men	women	Couples
0	Japan	Oct 11 1999 (#1)	Hory, Takaya, Kazu, Kin-chan		
1	South Korea	Oct 11 1999 (#1) - Nov 15 1999 (#6)	Hory, Takaya, Kazu, Kin-chan	Okan, Midori, Ai	Takaya ♥ Okan (1st)
2	China	Nov 15 1999 (#6) - Jan 17 2000 (#13)	Hory, Kin-chan, Shingo, Inotchi, Fuku, Jun	Midori, Ai, Tomo, Mio	Hory ♥ Ai (2nd)
3	Vietnam	Jan 17 2000 (#13) - Feb 28 2000 (#19)	Kin-chan, Inotchi, Fuku, Jun, Shū	Midori, Tomo, Mio, Kyōko	Inotchi ♥ Tomo (3rd)
4	Cambodia	Feb 28 2000 (#19) - Mar 13 2000 (#21)	Kin-chan, Jun, Tā-kun, Satoshi	Kyōko, Mie, Wakana	Jun ♥ Kyōko (4th)
5	Thailand	Mar 20 2000 (#22) - May 8, 2000 (#27)	Kin-chan, Tā-kun, Satoshi, Yūji	Mie, Wakana, Sanae	Kin-chan ♥ Midori (5th)^{*2}
6	India	May 15, 2000 (#28) - Jun 26 2000 (#34)	Sen-chan, Hisashi, GYO, Sunatchi, Haru	Mariko, Miyuki, Tanabē, Yuki	Hisashi ♥ Mariko (6th)^{*3}
7	Turkey	Jun 26 2000 (#34) - Jul 24 2000 (#38)	Sen-chan, GYO, Haru, Yassan	Miyuki, Tanabē, Yuki	GYO ♥ Miyuki (7th)
8	Bulgaria	Jul 24 2000 (#38) - Aug 07 2000 (#40)	Sen-chan, Haru, Yassan, Ken'ichi	Tanabē, Yuki, Devi	Haru ♥ Yuki (8th)
9	Greece	Aug 07 2000 (#40) - Aug 28 2000 (#43)	Sen-chan, Yassan, Ken'ichi	Tanabē, Devi	
10	Italy	Aug 28 2000 (#43) - Sep 25 2000 (#47)	Sen-chan, Ken'ichi, Fujiwara-kun, Gō, Paolo^{*1}	Devi, Nao, Chinatsu	
11	France	Sep 25 2000 (#47) - Nov 13 2000 (#53)	Sen-chan, Ken'ichi, Fujiwara-kun, Gō, Seki-chan	Devi, Nao, Chinatsu, Eri	Sen-chan ♥ Devi (9th); Fujiwara-kun ♥ Nao (10th)
12	Spain	Nov 13 2000 (#53) - Dec 18 2000 (#58)	Ken'ichi, Gō, Seki-chan, Tsune, Takashi	Chinatsu, Eri, Yūko, Hitomi	
13	Morocco	Dec 18 2000 (#58) - Jan 15 2001 (#61)	Gō, Seki-chan, Tsune, Takashi	Eri, Yūko, Hitomi	Gō ♥ Eri (11th)
14	Brazil	Jan 22 2001 (#62) - Feb 26 2001 (#66)	Seki-chan, Takashi, Ken, Sasayan	Yūko, Hitomi, Ogu	Sasayan ♥ Yūko (12th)
15	Paraguay	Feb 26 2001 (#66)	Seki-chan, Takashi, Ken	Hitomi, Ogu	
16	Argentina	Mar 05 2001 (#67) - Apr 03 2001 (#71)	Seki-chan, Takashi, Ken, Naoya	Hitomi, Ogu, Keiko	Ken ♥ Keiko (13th)
17	Chile	Apr 03 2001 (#71) - Apr 30 2001 (#75)	Seki-chan, Takashi, Naoya	Hitomi, Ogu, Ringo	Takashi ♥ Ogu (14th)
18	Bolivia	Apr 30 2001 (#75) - May 21, 2001 (#78)	Seki-chan, Naoya, Daisuke, Match-bō(Yamasaki)	Ringo, Yū, Tsutchy	
19	Peru	May 21, 2001 (#78) - Jul 02 2001 (#84)	Seki-chan, Naoya, Daisuke, Match-bō, Yōsei	Ringo, Yū, Tsutchy, Natchan	
20	Ecuador	Jul 02 2001 (#84) - Aug 13 2001 (#90)	Seki-chan, Naoya, Daisuke, Yōsei	Yū, Tsutchy, Natchan	
21	Panama	Aug 13 2001 (#90) - Sep 24 2001 (#95)	Seki-chan, Daisuke, Yōsei, Yasu	Natchan, Akky, Yūka	Yōsei ♥ Akky (15th)
22	Costa Rica	Oct 02 2001 (#96)	Seki-chan, Daisuke, Yasu, Reggae	Natchan, Yūka	Daisuke ♥ Natchan (16th)
23	Jamaica	Oct 02 2001 (#96) - Nov 05 2001 (#100)	Seki-chan, Yasu, Reggae, Tobi	Yūka, Ai, Vivi	Seki-chan ♥ Yūka (17th)
24	Cuba	Nov 12 2001 (#101) - Dec 17 2001 (#106)	Yasu, Reggae, Tobi, Yoshi-chan	Vivi, Mizuho, Yukinē	
25	Honduras	Dec 17 2001 (#106) - Jan 07 2002 (#108)	Reggae, Tobi, Yoshi-chan, Take	Vivi, Mizuho, Yukinē	
26	Guatemala	Jan 07 2002 (#108) - Feb 18 2002 (#114)	Reggae, Tobi, Yoshi-chan, Take	Vivi, Mizuho, Yukinē	Tobi ♥ Vivi (18th)
27	Belize	Feb 18 2002 (#114) - Mar 11 2002 (#116)	Reggae, Yoshi-chan, TAKA	Mizuho, Yukinē, Mika	
28	Mexico	Mar 11 2002 (#116) - Jun 24 2002 (#128)	Reggae, Yoshi-chan, TAKA, Tiger	Yukinē, Mika, Megu	Tiger ♥ Megu (19th); TAKA ♥ Mika (20th)
29	New Zealand	Jul 01 2002 (#129) - Aug 05 2002 (#134)	Nan-chan, Kōta, Keisuke, Tomokun	Osugi, Yuri, Wakana	
30	Australia	Aug 05 2002 (#134) - Oct 14 2002 (#143)	Nan-chan, Kōta, Keisuke, Daijō	Osugi, Yuri, Wakana, Yukachin	Keisuke ♥ Osugi (21st); Daijō ♥ Yuri (22nd)
31	Papua New Guinea	Oct 21 2002 (#144) - Nov 18 2002 (#148)	Nan-chan, Kōta, Tetsu, Tsunayoshi	Yukachin, Miho, Reika	
32	Tonga	Nov 25 2002 (#149) - Dec 02 2002 (#150)	Nan-chan, Kōta, Tetsu, Kazu-kun	Yukachin, Miho, Reika	
33	Fiji	Dec 02 2002 (#150) - Dec 23 2002 (#153)	Nan-chan, Kōta, Tetsu, Kazu-kun	Yukachin, Miho, Reika	
34	Nicaragua	Dec 29 2002 (#154) - Feb 03 2003 (#159)	Kōta, Tetsu, Kazu-kun	Yukachin, Miho, Reika	Kōta ♥ Miho (23rd)
35	United States	Feb 03 2003 (#159) - Apr 21 2003 (#168)	Kazu-kun, Miyaken, Takurō, Asa-chan, Dobokun	Yukachin, Saki, Marippe, Gachapin	Kazu-kun ♥ Yukachin (24th); Takurō ♥ Marippe (25th)
36	Canada	Apr 21 2003 (#168) - May 19, 2003 (#172)	Miyaken, Asa-chan, Dobokun, Tazy	Saki, Gachapin, Mikan	Dobokun ♥ Saki (26th)

- *1 : Paolo is a native person who participants met in the youth hostel in Italy. He could speak Japanese because he had stayed in Japan for one year.
- *2 : Once Midori had been jilted by Kin-chan, and been back to Japan from Vietnam. After that, she received a letter from him, and visited Thailand to meet him again there.
- *3 : Once Hisashi had been jilted by Mariko, and been back to Japan. But Mariko gave up the trip to meet Hisashi again in Japan.

=== The Second Lap ===
#	Country	Air date	Participants		Couples
#	Country	Air date	men	women	Couples
37	Philippines	May 26, 2003 (#173) - Jun 30 2003 (#178)	Miyaken, Asa-chan, Tazy, DAI	Gachapin, Mikan, Yukky, Michelle^{*1}	
38	Indonesia	Jun 30 2003 (#178) - Jul 28 2003 (#182)	Asa-chan, Tazy, DAI, Boxer	Gachapin, Yukky, Eiko, Sakura	
39	Brunei	Jul 28 2003 (#182) - Aug 04 2003 (#183)	Asa-chan, DAI, Boxer, Shima	Gachapin, Eiko, Sakura	
40	Malaysia	Aug 04 2003 (#183) - Aug 11 2003 (#184) & Aug 25 2003 (#186)	Asa-chan, DAI, Boxer, Shima	Gachapin, Eiko, Sakura	
41	Singapore	Aug 11 2003 (#184) - Aug 18 2003 (#185)	Asa-chan, DAI, Boxer, Shima	Gachapin, Eiko, Sakura	DAI ♥ Gachapin (27th)
42	Myanmar	Sep 01 2003 (#187) - Oct 13 2003 (#192)	Asa-chan, Boxer, Shima, Sōta, Hassy	Eiko, Sakura, Rii	
43	Bhutan	Oct 20 2003 (#193) - Dec 01 2003 (#198)	Sōta, Hassy, Hayato	Sakura, Rii, Yūmin	
44	Nepal	Dec 01 2003 (#198) - Jan 12 2004 (#203)	Asa-chan, Hassy, Hayato, Kōei	Rii, Yūmin, Kaji	
45	Sri Lanka	Jan 12 2004 (#203) - Feb 16 2004 (#208)	Asa-chan, Hassy, Hayato, Kōei	Yūmin, Kaji, Miki	
46	Madagascar	Feb 23 2004 (#209) - Apr 01 2004 (#214)	Asa-chan, Hayato, Kōei, Haolong	Yūmin, Kaji, Miki	
47	South Africa	Apr 01 2004 (#214) - May 17, 2004 (#220)	Hayato, Kōei, Haolong, Hakase	Yūmin, Kaji, Miki, Juri	Hayato ♥ Yūmin (28th); Kōei ♥ Miki (29th); Dominic (Driver) ♥ Kaji (30th)
48	Botswana	May 17, 2004 (#220) - Jun 07 2004 (#223)	Haolong, Hakase, Takky, Ryō	Juri, Yuka, Numatchi	
49	Namibia	Jun 14 2004 (#224) - Jul 19 2004 (#229)	Hakase, Takky, Ryō, Junpei	Juri, Yuka, Numatchi	Ryō ♥ Juri (31st)
50	Malawi	Jul 19 2004 (#229) - Aug 30 2004 (#235)	Takky, Junpei, Yū-kun, Hide	Yuka, Numatchi, Seriha	
51	Tanzania	Sep 06 2004 (#236) - Oct 18 2004 (#241)	Junpei, Yū-kun, Hide, Itchy	Numatchi, Seriha, Kayo, Pendo^{*1}	
52	Kenya	Oct 18 2004 (#241) - Nov 22 2004 (#246)	Junpei, Yū-kun, Hide, Itchy	Seriha, Kayo, Ōse	
53	Ethiopia	Nov 22 2004 (#246) - Jan 27 2005 (#252)	Junpei, Yū-kun, Hide, Itchy, Haisha	Seriha, Ōse, Salt	Itchy ♥ Seriha (32nd)
54	Cameroon	Jan 10 2005 (#252) - Feb 14 2005 (#257)	Junpei, Yū-kun, Hide, Bukurō	Ōse, Salt, Riko	
55	Tunisia	Feb 14 2005 (#257) - Apr 11 2005 (#263)	Yū-kun, Hide, Bukurō, Kōji	Ōse, Salt, Riko	Yū-kun ♥ Riko (33rd)
56	Egypt	Apr 11 2005 (#263) - May 16, 2005 (#268)	Hide, Bukurō, Kōji, Arashi	Ōse, Mikarin, Omami	Bukurō ♥ Ōse (34th)
57	Oman	May 16, 2005 (#268) - Jun 13 2005 (#272)	Hide, Kōji, Arashi, Susan	Mikarin, Omami, Takano	
58	United Arab Emirates	Jun 13 2005 (#272) - Jul 18 2005 (#277)	Hide, Kōji, Arashi, Susan	Mikarin, Takano, Natchi	
59	Qatar	Jul 25 2005 (#278) - Aug 01 2005 (#279)	Hide, Arashi, Susan, tk	Mikarin, Takano	
60	Bahrain	Aug 01 2005 (#279) - Sep 05 2005 (#284)	Hide, Arashi, Susan, tk	Mikarin, Omami, Takano	
61	Russia	Sep 12 2005 (#285) - Oct 17 2005 (#288)	Hide, Arashi, Susan, tk	MIE, Ume-chan, Aya	
62	Ukraine	Oct 17 2005 (#288) - Nov 28 2005 (#294)	Hide, Arashi, Susan, tk	MIE, Ume-chan, Aya	
63	Romania	Nov 28 2005 (#294) - Jan 16 2006 (#299)	Hide, Arashi, Susan, Alec	MIE, Ume-chan, Aya	Arashi ♥ Aya (35th)
64	Hungary	Jan 16 2006 (#299) - Mar 06 2006 (#305)	Susan, Alec, Tagami-kun, Outlaw	MIE, Izumi, Hisayon, Andy^{*1}	
65	Austria	Mar 13 2006 (#306) - Apr 24 2006 (#310)	Susan, Alec, Tagami-kun, Outlaw	Izumi, Hisayon, Goki	
66	Liechtenstein	Apr 24 2006 (#310)	Susan, Tagami-kun, Outlaw	Izumi, Hisayon, Goki	
67	Switzerland	Apr 24 2006 (#310) - Jun 19 2006 (#318)	Susan, Tagami-kun, Outlaw, Sōri	Izumi, Hisayon, Goki	Outlaw ♥ Goki^{*2} Susan ♥ MIE (36th)^{*3}
68	Croatia	Jul 03 2006 (#320) - Jul 24 2006 (#323)	Tagami-kun, Sōri, Tachi, Uekki	Hisayon, Chaki, Yankumi	
69	Bosnia and Herzegovina	Jul 31 2006 (#324) - Aug 28 2006 (#328)	Sōri, Tachi, Uekki, Yokomī	Hisayon, Chaki, Yankumi	
70	Poland	Sep 04 2006 (#329) - Oct 23 2006 (#334)	Tachi, Uekki, Yokomī, San-chan	Chaki, Yankumi, Junko	Tachi ♥ Junko (37th)
71	Sweden	Oct 30 2006 (#335) - Dec 04 2006 (#340)	Uekki, Yokomī, San-chan, ISSY	Chaki, Yankumi, Nagisa	Uekki ♥ Chaki (38th)
72	Norway	Dec 11 2006 (#341) - Jan 29 2007 (#346)	Yokomī, San-chan, ISSY, Gla-san	Yankumi, Nagisa, Bambi	
73	Iceland	Feb 12 2007 (#348) - Mar 19 2007 (#352)	San-chan, ISSY, Gla-san, Moriken	Nagisa, Bambi, Miyanē	ISSY ♥ Nagisa (39th)

- *1 : Michele, Pendo, and Andy are native persons. Michele was a special participant as the commemoration of the Second Lap. Pendo and Andy took part in the trip during a single episode.
- *2 : In the episode #315, Outlaw gave up the trip because of the mistake by the staff, and Goki also did. But in the episode #317, they reported that they had met again in Japan and had started to love each other. Although they are not counted as an official couple of the program.
- *3 : Once MIE had been jilted by Susan, and been back to Japan from Hungary. But in Switzerland Susan gave up the trip and returned to Japan to meet her again.

=== The Indefinite Travel (after the Second Lap) ===
#	Country	Air date	Participants		Couples
#	Country	Air date	men	women	Couples
74	Dominican Republic	Apr 09 2007 (#353) - May 7, 2007 (#357)	San-chan, Gla-san, Moriken, Oga	Bambi, Miyanē, Hiroe	
75	Trinidad and Tobago	May 21, 2007 (#359) - May 28 2007 (#360)	San-chan, Gla-san, Moriken, Oga	Miyanē, Hiroe, Neko	
76	Suriname	Jun 04 2007 (#361) - Jun 18 2007 (#363)	San-chan, Gla-san, Moriken, Oga	Miyanē, Hiroe, Neko	
77	Venezuela	Jun 18 2007 (#363) - Jul 30 2007 (#368)	Gla-san, Moriken, Oga, Hiderinko	Miyanē, Hiroe, Neko	
78	Taiwan	Aug 06 2007 (#369) - Sep 03 2007 (#373)	Gla-san, Moriken, Teppei, Pochi	Hiroe, Neko, Kuu	
79	Tuvalu	Sep 03 2007 (#373) - Sep 17 2007 (#375)	Moriken, Teppei, Pochi	Neko, Kuu, Chaba	
80	Samoa	Sep 24 2007 (#376) - Oct 22 2007 (#378)	Moriken, Teppei, Pochi, Carbonara	Neko, Kuu, Chaba	Moriken ♥ Kuu (40th)
81	Mongolia	Oct 29 2007 (#379) - Nov 26 2007 (#383)	Teppei, Carbonara, Danny	Neko, Chaba, Remi	
82	Germany	Dec 03 2007 (#384) - Mar 10 2008 (#394)	Carbonara, Danny, Miya-kun, Ryō, Seiji	Remi, Momo, Kuro	Ryō ♥ Remi (41st)
83	Czech Republic	Mar 10 2008 (#395) - Apr 14 2008 (#398)	Danny, Miya-kun, Seiji, Umi	Momo, Kuro, Yokko	
84	Slovakia	Apr 14 2008 (#398)	Danny, Miya-kun, Seiji, Umi	Momo, Kuro, Yokko	
85	Ghana	Apr 21 2008 (#399) - May 26, 2008 (#403)	Miya-kun, Seiji, Umi, Kōsuke	Momo, Kuro, Yokko	
86	Benin	May 26, 2008 (#403) - Jul 28 2008 (#412)	Miya-kun, Umi, Kōsuke, Shrek	Momo, Kuro, Yokko	
87	Mali	Aug 04 2008 (#413) - Aug 25 2008 (#416)	Umi, Kōsuke, Shrek	Momo, Yokko, Yamaji	
88	Laos	Sep 02 2008 (#417) - Nov 03 2008 (#424)	Kōsuke, Shrek, Umeo, Gōya	Momo, Yokko, Yamaji	Kōsuke ♥ Yokko (42nd)
89	Jordan	Nov 03 2008 (#424) - Dec 15 2008 (#430)	Shrek, Umeo, Gōya, Tadatchi	Momo, Yamaji, Māmin	Umeo ♥ Momo (43rd)
90	Cyprus	Dec 22 2008 (#431) - Feb 9 2009 (#436)	Shrek, Gōya, Tadatchi, Wrestler (Ryouji Sai)	Yamaji, Māmin, Hime	
91	Denmark	Feb 9 2009 (#436) - Mar 23 2009 (#441)	Shrek, Gōya, Tadatchi, Wrestler	Māmin, Hime, Garlic	Gōya ♥ Hime (44th)
92	Netherlands	Mar 23 2009 (#441)	Shrek, Tadatchi, Wrestler, Shun	Māmin, Garlic, Shihonosuke	

=== Ainori 2 ===
#	Country	Air date	Participants		Couples
#	Country	Air date	men	women	Couples
01	Bangladesh	Dec 25 2010 (#001) - Apr 30 2011 (#010)	Denji, Kawahei, Kobacchi, Gorilla, Keeper, Takkan	Asami, Yamaji, Chamu, Yui, Hakamai	Kobacchi ♥ Asami (45th); Kawahei ♥ Chamu (46th)

=== Ainori: Asian Journey (Netflix) ===
#	Country	Air date	Participants		Couples
#	Country	Air date	men	women	Couples
01	Vietnam	Nov 26 2017 (#001) - Apr 22 2018 (#022)	Yuchan, Wedding, Hatomune, Taka	Yumechin, Depparin, Asuka	
02	Myanmar	Nov 26 2017 (#001) - Apr 22 2018 (#022)	Yuchan, Wedding, Hatomune, ShyBoy	Yumechin, Depparin, Asuka	
03	Taiwan	Nov 26 2017 (#001) - Apr 22 2018 (#022)	Yuchan, Wedding, Hatomune, ShyBoy, Akira (later)	Depparin, Asuka, Kasuga	
04	Thailand	Nov 26 2017 (#001) - Apr 22 2018 (#022)	Yuchan, ShyBoy, Akira, Tom	Asuka, Kasuga, Kanya	Yuchan & Asuka (1st)
05	Malaysia	Nov 26 2017 (#001) - Apr 22 2018 (#022)	ShyBoy, Akira, Tom, Shacho	Kasuga, Kanya, Yuchan	ShyBoy & Kasuga (2nd)
06	Singapore	Nov 26 2017 (#001) - Apr 22 2018 (#022)	Akira, Tom, Shacho	Kanya, Yuchan	

Ainori: Asian Journey Season 2 (Netflix)

#	Country	Participants		Couples
#	Country	men	women	Couples
07	India - Mumbaj, bengaluru, Kochi, kovalam	Tom, Miyanma, Dr Morimori, Isamuchan	Yuchan, Moa, Depparin	no match
08	Nepal - Katmand, Dźanakpuru	Hidekun, Tom, Miyanma, Dr Morimori	Yuchan, Moa, Depparin	Yuchan&Miyanma (1st in season, 4th in program)
09	Uzbekistan - Tashkent, Samarkanda	Hidekun, Tom, Dr Morimori, Al	Moa, Depparin, Sakurako	Dr Morimori&Moa (2nd in season, 5th in program)
10	(Kazakhstan) Kazachstan - Astan	Hidekun, Tom , Al, Junki	Mya, Depparin, Sakurako	No match
11	Kyrgyzstan	Hidekun, Tom, Junki, Taizo	Mya, Depparin, Sakurako	Depparin&Junki (3rd in season, 6th in program)

=== Ainori: African Journey (Netflix) ===
#	Country	Participants		Couples
#	Country	Men	Women	Couples
01	Kenya	Shu-mai, U-zi, O-ji, Haribo	Su-su, Husky, Kou	No match
02	Uganda	Shu-Mai. O-ji, Haribo, Hide	Su-su, Husky, Kou	Su-su & Haribo (1st in season, 1st in program)
03	Rwanda	Shu-Mai, O-ji, Hide, Joykun	Husky, Kou, Yuina	No match
04	Tanzania	Shu-Mai, Hide, Joykun, Genove	Husky, Yuina, Aonyan	Genove & Aonyan (2nd in season, 2nd in program) Joykun & Husky (3rd in season, 3rd in program)

== Fundraising ==
Since April 2004, the program started the fundraising campaign called Ainori Bokin (Ainori Fundraising). This is a donation for poor countries visited in the program. The money has been mainly used for children living in these countries, and the schools called Ainori Gakko (Ainori School) have been built.

== Commentators ==
- Masami Hisamoto – October 11, 1999 – 2006
- Koji Imada – October 11, 1999 – 2006
- Haruhiko Katō – October 11, 1999 – March 20, 2006
- Eiji Wentz – April 10, 2006 – 2011
- Becky – October 2017 – present
- Mayuko Kawakita – October 2017 – 2018
- Audrey – October 2017 – 2018
- Shimon Okura – October 2017 – 2018
- Asako Ito – November 2018 – July 2019
- Natsuna Watanabe – November 2018 – July 2019
- Karina Maruyama – January 2020 – present
- Ryo Kato – January 2020 – present
- Kouhei Takeda – January 2020 – present

== International versions ==
=== Vietnam ===
The Vietnamese version is called "Hành trình kết nối những trái tim" ("Journey to match hearts"), or "Love bus", was broadcast in December 2008, becoming a high rated show of Ho Chi Minh City and Hanoi Television. It is originally aired every Tuesday at 10PM.
