= Fun-Fare =

Studio album by Every Little Thing
- Released: February 19, 2014
- Genre: J-pop; synthpop
- Label: Avex Trax
- Producer: Masato Matsuura (exec.)

Every Little Thing chronology
Ordinary (2011)	Fun-Fare (2014)	Every Cheering Songs (2015)

Singles from Fun-Fare
- 1. "Landscape" Released: December 7, 2011; 2. "On and On" Released: February 20, 2013; 3. "Harinezumi no Koi" Released: April 10, 2013; 4. "Aquamarine no Mama de Ite" Released: August 24, 2013; 5. "Take Me Tell Me" Released: April 22, 2015

Fun-Fare is the eleventh studio album by Japanese music duo Every Little Thing. It was released on February 19, 2014, by Avex Trax.

== Background ==
This is the band's first album in two and a half years, and includes singles from "Landscape", which was used in TV commercials for Toyota Isis and released as single in late 2011, to "Aquamarine no Mama de Ite", originally a cover from Carlos Toshiki & Omega Tribe and used as theme song of Fuji TV drama Dakishimetai! Forever, released digitally in August 2013.

"Start", which was used on TV Tokyo coverage of the 2014 Winter Olympics, was released digitally on February 5, 2014.

== Chart performance ==
In its first week, Fun-Fare charted at number seven on the Oricon charts, selling 9,891 copies. On its second week it fell abruptly to the 50th position on the charts, selling 2,141 copies (a total of 12,032 copies sold).

== Track listing ==
CD
No.	Title	Lyrics	Music	Arranger(s)	Length
1.	"BFF"	Kaori Mochida, Jan Rooymans, Jochem Fluitsma, Andy Platts	Rooymans, Fluitsma, Platts	Rooymans, Fluitsma, Platts	2:58
2.	"Take Me Tell Me"	Mochida	Hikari	Hikari^{[a]}	4:35
3.	"On and On"	Mochida	Hikari	Hikari^{[a]}	4:12
4.	"Harinezumi no Koi" (ハリネズミの恋)	Mochida	Kunio Tago	Akira Murata^{[a]}	3:29
5.	"Start"	Mochida	Hikari	Hikari^{[a]}	3:59
6.	"Lien"	Mochida	Eiji Kawai	Shinjiro Inoue^{[a]}	5:12
7.	"Mighty Boys" (Instrumental)		Ichiro Ito	Yasunari Nakamura^{[b]}	2:19
8.	"Sympathy"	Mochida	Atsushi Suemitsu	Masafumi Hayashi^{[a]}	4:13
9.	"Aquamarine no Mama de Ite" (アクアマリンのままでいて)	Masao Urino	Tsunehiro Izumi	Yasuharu Konishi	3:56
10.	"Landscape"	Mochida	Hikari	Hikari^{[a]}	4:21
11.	"Lovers" (Instrumental)		Ito	Nakamura^{[b]}	1:40
12.	"Kimi to" (キミト)	Mochida	Kawai	Kawai^{[a]}	4:00

DVD
No.	Title	Length
1.	"Landscape" (Music video)
2.	"On and On" (Music video)
3.	"Harinezumi no Koi" (Music video)
4.	"Start" (Music video)
5.	"Start" (Music video - Making movie)

Notes

- ^{^a} co-arranged by Every Little Thing
- ^{^b} co-arranged by Ichiro Ito

== Charts ==
Release	Chart	Peak position	Sales total
February 19, 2014	Oricon Weekly Albums Chart	7	14,343 copies sold
