= Moka (album) =

Studio album by Kaori Mochida
- Released: August 12, 2009
- Genre: J-pop
- Label: Avex Trax

Moka is the debut solo album from Japanese singer Kaori Mochida. It was released on August 12, 2009.

== Track listing ==
CD
Catalog number	Track	Title	Translation
AVCD-23901	1	Hajimari to wa (はじまりとは, It begins)	
AVCD-23901	2	Drop	
AVCD-23901	3	Tao (タオ)	
AVCD-23901	4	weather	
AVCD-23901	5	Ame no Waltz (雨のワルツ, The Waltz in the Rain)	
AVCD-23901	6	ABC	
AVCD-23901	7	Real and Imagined	
AVCD-23901	8	Please Me (プリーズ ミー)	
AVCD-23901	9	Shizuka na Yoru (静かな夜, Silent Night)	
AVCD-23901	10	Kimi no Kureta Sekai (君のくれた世界, The World You Gave Me)	
AVCD-23901	11	Nemure Nemuru (ねむれ ねむる, Sleep Sleeping)	
AVCD-23901	12	Every day Love	

DVD
Catalog number	Track	Title
AVCD-23901	1	Tao (Video clip)
AVCD-23901	2	Ame no Waltz & Shizuka na Yoru video clip OFF-SHOT & "Moka" Photo Shoot OFF-SHOT

== Charts ==
Chart	Peak position	Sales	Time in chart
Oricon Weekly Albums	#9	11,431	N/A
