= Crispy Park =

Studio album by Every Little Thing
- Released: August 9, 2006
- Genres: J-pop; pop rock; synthpop
- Length: 57:33
- Label: Avex Trax

Every Little Thing chronology
Acoustic : Latte (2005)	Crispy Park (2006)	14 Message: Every Ballad Songs 2 (2007)

Singles from Crispy Park
- 1. "Koibumi/Good Night" Released: December 15, 2004; 2. "Kimi no Te" Released: October 26, 2005; 3. "Azure Moon" Released: March 15, 2006; 4. "Hi-Fi Message" Released: June 14, 2006; 5. "Swimmy" Released: August 30, 2006

Crispy Park is the seventh album by the Japanese pop rock group Every Little Thing, released on August 9, 2006. The album reached number one on the Oricon albums chart.

A limited first edition release of the album, with alternative album cover art, contained a photo book and DVD of bonus footage to commemorate the group's tenth anniversary.

== Track listing ==
All lyrics are written by Kaori Mochida.

CD
No.	Title	Music	Arranger(s)	Length
1.	"Hi-Fi Message" (ハイファイ メッセージ)	Hikari	Hikari^{[a]}	5:31
2.	"Swimmy" (スイミー)	Daichi Hayakawa	Yasunari Nakamura^{[a]}	4:59
3.	"Kazemachi Kokoro Moyō" (風待ち心もよう)	Hikari	Masafumi Hayashi^{[a]}	3:58
4.	"Ame no Naru Yoru, Shizuku wo Kimi ni" (雨の鳴る夜、しずくを君に)	Kunio Tago	Tomoji Sogawa^{[a]}	5:05
5.	"Koibumi" (恋文)	Hikari	Hikari^{[a]}	5:01
6.	"Scarlet" (スカーレット)	Kaori Mochida	Akira Murata^{[a]}	5:51
7.	"Sweet Emergency" (Instrumental)	Ichiro Ito	Nakamura^{[b]}	1:39
8.	"Asu no Kokoro" (あすの心)	Yuta Nakano	Yanagiman^{[a]}	5:03
9.	"Kimi no Te" (きみの て)	Hikari	Hikari^{[a]}	4:51
10.	"Izure mo Romantic" (いずれもROMANTIC)	Ito	Nakamura^{[b]}	3:20
11.	"Azure Moon"	Hikari	Hikari^{[a]}	5:24
12.	"I Met You" (Instrumental)	Ito	Nakamura^{[b]}	1:59
13.	"Good Night"	Hikari	Hikari^{[b]}	5:01

DVD
No.	Title	Length
1.	"Hi-Fi Message Photo shoot Off-Shot"
2.	"Crispy Park Photo shoot Off-Shot"
3.	"Nostalgia" (X'mas Acoustic Live at Urakami Tenshudō: Ai no Uta^{[c]})
4.	"Water(s)" (X'mas Acoustic Live at Urakami Tenshudō: Ai no Uta)
5.	"Soraai" (X'mas Acoustic Live at Urakami Tenshudō: Ai no Uta)
6.	"Samidare" (X'mas Acoustic Live at Urakami Tenshudō: Ai no Uta)
7.	"Ai no Uta" (X'mas Acoustic Live at Urakami Tenshudō: Ai no Uta)

Notes

- ^{^a} co-arranged by Every Little Thing
- ^{^b} co-arranged by Ichiro Ito
- ^{^c} Christmas concert held at the Urakami Cathedral on December 11, 2005.

== Charts ==
Release	Chart	Peak position	Sales total
August 9, 2006	Oricon Weekly Albums Chart	1	209,316 copies sold
