= Fundamental Love =

Single by Every Little Thing

from the album commonplace
- Released: July 30, 2003
- Genre: J-pop
- Length: 10:16 ("Fundamental Love" and "nostalgia" only)
- Label: avex trax
- Songwriter: Kaori Mochida

Every Little Thing singles chronology
"Grip!" (2003)	"Fundamental Love" (2003)	"Mata Ashita" (2003)

"Fundamental Love" (ファンダメンタル・ラブ) is the 25th single by the Japanese J-pop group Every Little Thing, released on July 30, 2003.

== Track listing ==
1. Fundamental Love (ファンダメンタル・ラブ) (Words - Kaori Mochida / music - Kunio Tago)
2. nostalgia (2003614 version) (Words - Kaori Mochida / music - Kazuhito Kikuchi)
3. Fundamental Love (ファンダメンタル・ラブ) (instrumental)

== Charts ==
Chart (2003)	Peak position
Japan Oricon Singles Chart	9
