= Atarashii Hibi/Ōgon no Tsuki =

Single by Every Little Thing
- Released: August 27, 2008
- Genre: J-pop
- Label: Avex Trax
- Composer: Eriko Yoshiki
- Lyricist: Kaori Mochida

Every Little Thing singles chronology
"Sakurabito" (2008)	"Atarashii Hibi/Ōgon no Tsuki" (2008)	"Dream Goes On" (2009)

"Atarashii Hibi/Ōgon no Tsuki" (あたらしい日々/黄金の月; "New Days/Golden Moon") is the 35th single by the Japanese pop group Every Little Thing, released on August 27, 2008. It was used as the theme song for the drama Shibatora and charted on the Billboard Japan Hot 100, peaking at 7.

== Track listing ==
1. Atarashii Hibi (あたらしい日々)
  (Words - Kaori Mochida / Music - Eriko Yoshiki)
2. Ogon no Tsuki (黄金の月)
  (Words & Music - Kaori Mochida)
3. Atarashii Hibi(Instrumental) (あたらしい日々(Instrumental))
4. Ogon no Tsuki(Instrumental) (黄金の月(Instrumental))
