= Soraai =

Single by Every Little Thing

from the album Commonplace
- Released: February 25, 2004
- Genre: J-pop
- Length: 11:20 ("Soraai" and "Stray Cat" only)
- Label: avex trax
- Songwriter: Kaori Mochida

Every Little Thing singles chronology
"Mata Ashita" (2003)	"Soraai" (2004)	"Koibumi/Good Night" (2004)

"Soraai" (ソラアイ) is the 27th single by the Japanese J-pop group Every Little Thing, released on February 25, 2004.

== Track listing ==
1. Soraai (ソラアイ) (Words - Kaori Mochida / music - HIKARI)
2. Stray cat (20031223 version) (Words - Kaori Mochida / music - Kazuhiro Hara)
3. Soraai (ソラアイ) (instrumental)

== Charts ==
Chart (2004)	Peak position
Japan Oricon singles chart	8
