= Jump (Every Little Thing song) =

2001 single by Every Little Thing

Single by Every Little Thing

from the album Many Pieces
- Released: October 17, 2001
- Genre: J-pop
- Length: 4:06 ("Jump" only)
- Label: avex trax
- Songwriter(s): Kaori Mochida

Every Little Thing singles chronology
"Graceful World" (2001)	"Jump" (2001)	"Kioku" (2002)

"Jump" is a song by the Japanese J-pop group Every Little Thing, released as their 20th single on October 17, 2001. It is their first song composed by Kaori Mochida.

== Track listing ==
1. Jump (Words & music - Kaori Mochida)
2. Jump (Cubismo Graphico mix)
3. Jump (iInstrumental)

== Charts ==
Chart (2001)	Peak position
Japan Oricon Singles Chart	7
