= 10th Anniversary Special Live at Nippon Budokan =

10th Anniversary Live at Nippon Budokan

Live album by Every Little Thing
- Released: August 8, 2007
- Recorded: March 6–7, 2007
- Venue: Nippon Budokan
- Genre: J-Pop
- Label: Avex Trax
- Producer: Max Matsuura

Every Little Thing chronology
Concert Tour 2006-2007: Crispy Park (2007)	10th Anniversary Live at Nippon Budokan (2007)	Concert Tour 2008 "Door" (2008)

10th Anniversary Live at Nippon Budokan is a live DVD by Japanese duo Every Little Thing, released August 8, 2007, by Avex Trax. The footage was recorded during a 2-day concert at the Nippon Budokan, March 6–7, 2007, in celebration of their tenth anniversary in the music industry, and includes behind-the-scenes clips documenting the making of the concert.

== Track listing ==
No.	Title	Length
1.	"Opening SE"
2.	"Feel My Heart"
3.	"Future World"
4.	"Jump"
5.	"Daisy" (デージー)
6.	"Unspeakable"
7.	"Face the Change"
8.	"For the Moment"
9.	"Kioku" (Memory (キヲク))
10.	"Medley" ("Necessary", "Forever Yours", "Rescue Me")
11.	"Sweet Emergency" (Instrumental)
12.	"Ambivalence"
13.	"Fragile"
14.	"Time Goes By"
15.	"Free Walkin'"
16.	"Shapes of Love"
17.	"Mata Ashita" (See You Tomorrow (また あした))
18.	"Deatta Koro no Yō ni" (Just Like When We First Met (出逢った頃のように))
19.	"Hi-Fi Message" (ハイファイ メッセージ)
20.	"Dear My Friend"
21.	"Behind The Scenes" (Bonus Track)
