= Graceful World =

Single by Every Little Thing

from the album 4 Force
- Released: February 21, 2001; 24 years ago
- Genre: J-pop
- Length: 5:04 ("Graceful World" only)
- Label: avex trax
- Songwriter(s): Kaori Mochida

Every Little Thing singles chronology
"Fragile/Jirenma" (2001)	"Graceful World" (2001)	"Jump" (2001)

"Graceful World" is a song by the Japanese J-pop group Every Little Thing, released as their nineteenth single on February 21, 2001. It was used as the theme song for the TV drama Big Wing.

== Track listing ==
1. Graceful World (Words - Kaori Mochida / music - Yasuo Ohtani)
2. Graceful World (2 Fat GTR mix)
3. Graceful World (Amazing mix)
4. Graceful World (instrumental)

== Charts ==
Chart (2001)	Peak position
Japan Oricon	5
