= Hi-Fi Message =

Single by Every Little Thing

from the album Crispy Park
- Released: June 14, 2006
- Genre: J-pop
- Label: Avex Trax
- Songwriter: Kaori Mochida

Every Little Thing singles chronology
"Azure Moon" (2006)	"Hi-Fi Message" (2006)	"Swimmy" (2006)

"Hi-Fi Message" (ハイファイ メッセージ) is the 31st single by the Japanese J-pop group Every Little Thing, released on June 14, 2006.

== Track listing ==
1. Hi-Fi Message (ハイファイ メッセージ) (Words - Kaori Mochida / music - HIKARI)
2. Baby Love (Words & music - Lamont Dozier & Brian Holland & Eddie Holland)
3. Hi-Fi Message (Instrumental) (ハイファイ メッセージ (instrumental))

== Charts ==
Chart (2006)	Peak position
Japan Oricon Singles Chart	9
