= Kioku (Every Little Thing song) =

Single by Every Little Thing

from the album Many Pieces
- Released: May 15, 2002
- Genre: J-pop
- Length: 9:37 ("Kioku'" and "Time Trip" only)
- Label: avex trax
- Composer: Kazuhito Kikuchi
- Lyricist: Kaori Mochida
- Producer: Max Matsuura

Every Little Thing singles chronology
"Jump" (2001)	"Kioku" (2002)	"Sasayaka na Inori" (2002)

"Kioku" (キヲク) is a song by the J-pop group Every Little Thing, released as their 21st single on May 15, 2002. It was used as the theme song of the TBS drama Shiawase no Shippo.

== Track listing ==
1. Kioku (キヲク) (Words - Kaori Mochida / music - Kazuhito Kikuchi)
2. Time Trip boku ga boku de aru tame ni (僕が僕であるために) (Words & music - Kaori Mochida)
3. Kioku (キヲク) (Cbsmgrfc Fatback mix)
4. Time Trip 僕が僕であるために (Sunaga't Experience du jazz)
5. Kioku (キヲク) (instrumental)
6. Time Trip 僕が僕であるために (instrumental)

== Charts ==
Chart (2002)	Peak position
Japan Oricon Singles Chart	4
