= Future World (Every Little Thing song) =

Single by Every Little Thing

from the album Everlasting
- Released: October 23, 1996
- Genre: J-Pop
- Length: 17:01
- Label: avex trax
- Songwriter(s): Mitsuru Igarashi
- Producer(s): Mitsuru Igarashi

Every Little Thing singles chronology
| "Feel My Heart" (1996) | "Future World" (1996) | "Dear My Friend" (1997) |

"Future World" is a song by the Japanese J-pop group Every Little Thing, released as their second single on October 23, 1996.

== Track listing ==
1. Future World — 4:05 (Words & music - Mitsuru Igarashi)
2. Season — 4:26 (Words & music - Mitsuru Igarashi)
3. Future World (instrumental) — 4:04
4. Season (instrumental) — 4:25

== Chart positions ==
| Chart (1996) | Peak position |
|---|---|
| Japan Oricon Singles Chart | 20 |
