= Someday, Someplace =

"Someday,Someplace"

Single by Every Little Thing

from the album Every Best Single +3
- Released: March 3, 1999
- Genre: J-pop
- Length: 4:31 (Someday,Someplace only)
- Label: avex trax
- Songwriter(s): Mitsuru Igarashi

Every Little Thing singles chronology
| "Over and Over" (1999) | "Someday,Someplace" (1999) | "Over and Over / ELT Songs from L.A." (1999) |

"Someday, Someplace" is a song by the Japanese J-pop group Every Little Thing, released as their twelfth single on March 3, 1999.

== Track listing ==
1. Someday, Someplace (Words & music - Mitsuru Igarashi)
2. Someday, Someplace (Hal's remix)
3. Someday, Someplace (instrumental)

== Charts ==
| Chart (1999) | Peak position |
|---|---|
| Japan Oricon | 4 |
