= Swimmy =

Single by Every Little Thing

from the album Crispy Park
- Released: August 30, 2006
- Genre: J-pop
- Length: ???
- Label: Avex Trax
- Songwriter: Kaori Mochida

Every Little Thing singles chronology
"Hi-Fi Message" (2006)	"Swimmy" (2006)	"Kirameki Hour" (2007)

"Swimmy" (スイミー) is the 32nd single by the Japanese J-pop group Every Little Thing, released on August 30, 2006. It was the theme song of the drama Kekkon Dekinai Otoko.

== Track listing ==
1. Swimmy (スイミー) (Words - Kaori Mochida / music - Daichi Hayakawa)
2. Swimmy (Akakage's Sweetest Beach) (スイミー(Akakage's Sweetest Beach))
3. Swimmy (instrumental) (スイミー(instrumental))

== Charts ==
Chart (2006)	Peak position
Japan Oricon singles chart	16
