= Sora/Koe =

Single by Every Little Thing

from the album ORDINARY
- Released: July 13, 2011
- Recorded: 2011
- Genre: J-pop
- Label: Avex Trax

Every Little Thing singles chronology
"Moon" (2011)	"Sora/Koe" (2011)	"Ai ga Aru" (2011)

"Sora/Koe" (宙 -そら-/響 -こえ-; lit. Air/Voice) is the 42nd single of the Japanese pop group Every Little Thing, released on July 13, 2011. The single contains two songs: "Sora" and its B-side, "Koe". Both songs are used as the ending theme for the Pokémon movie Victini and the Black Hero: Zekrom and Victini and the White Hero: Reshiram.

== Track listing ==
=== CD ===
1. Sora (宙 -そら-; Air)
  (Words - Kaori Mochida / Music - Kazuhito Kikuchi)
2. Koe (響 -こえ-; Voice)
  (Words - Kaori Mochida / Music - Kazuhito Kikuchi)
3. Sora (Instrumental) (宙 -そら- (Instrumental); Air (Instrumental))
4. Koe (Instrumental) (響 -こえ- (Instrumental); Voice (Instrumental))

=== DVD ===
1. Sora (Video Clip(Original Version)) (宙 -そら- (Video Clip(Original Version)); Air (Video Clip(Original Version)))
2. Sora (Video Clip(Pokemon Version)) (宙 -そら- (Video Clip(Pokemon Version)); Air (Video Clip(Pokemon Version)))
