= Azure Moon =

Single by Every Little Thing

from the album Crispy Park
- Released: March 15, 2006
- Genre: J-pop
- Label: Avex Trax
- Composer: HIKARI
- Lyricist: Kaori Mochida

Every Little Thing singles chronology
"Kimi no Te" (2005)	"Azure Moon" (2006)	"Hi-Fi Message" (2006)

The song "Azure Moon" is Every Little Thing's 29th single released by the Avex Trax label. "Azure Moon" was a ballad single that also included a special acoustic version of their 2004 single "Soraai" for Every Little Thing's concert "Every Little Thing X'mas Acoustic Live at Uragami Tenshudou: Ai no Uta", which took place at Nagasaki on December 11, 2005. The single peaked in 12th place on its first week at the charts and sold 17,212 copies.

== Track listing ==
1. Azure Moon (Words - Kaori Mochida / music - HIKARI)
2. Soraai (ソラアイ) (20051211 version) (Words - Kaori Mochida / music - HIKARI)
3. Azure Moon (Instrumental)

== Charts ==
Oricon sales chart (Japan)

Release	Chart	Peak position	Sales total
March 15, 2006	Oricon Daily Singles Chart	6	
March 15, 2006	Oricon Weekly Singles Chart	12	17,212 copies sold
