= Dear My Friend (Every Little Thing song) =

Single by Every Little Thing

from the album Everlasting
- Released: January 22, 1997
- Genre: J-pop
- Length: 14:58
- Label: avex trax
- Songwriter: Mitsuru Igarashi
- Producer: Mitsuru Igarashi

Every Little Thing singles chronology
"Future World" (1996)	"Dear My Friend" (1997)	"For the Moment" (1997)

"Dear My Friend" is a song by the Japanese J-pop group Every Little Thing, released as their third single on January 22, 1997.

== Track listing ==
1. Dear My Friend — 3:48 (Words & music - Mitsuru Igarashi)
2. Dear My Friend (U.K. mix) — 7:21
3. Dear My Friend (instrumental) — 3:47

== Charts ==
Chart (1997)	Peak position
Japan Oricon	9
