= Koibumi/Good Night =

Single by Every Little Thing

from the album Crispy Park
- Released: December 15, 2004
- Genre: J-pop
- Length: 9:56 ("Koibumi" and "Good Night" only)
- Label: avex trax
- Songwriter: Kaori Mochida

Every Little Thing singles chronology
"Soraai" (2003)	"Koibumi/Good Night" (2004)	"Kimi no Te" (2005)

"Koibumi (恋文, lit. Love Letter)/Good Night" is the 28th single by the Japanese J-pop group Every Little Thing, released on December 15, 2004, and their sixth single to reach the top position at the Oricon chart.

Koibumi is used for one of the commercials of Nobel's Hachimisu Kinkan Nodo Ame candy and the movie Love Letter from Heaven while "Good Night" is used as the opening theme song of the PlayStation 2 Game, Tales of Rebirth. It peaked at first place in the Oricon Sales Chart for 18 straight weeks.

== Reception ==
RPGFan wrote: "I liked the single, and it gave me a good impression of ELT’s music, but I don’t consider it a must-have. Get it if you are a fan of the band or the Tales of Rebirth theme from the game, but in my mind, neither song was great."

== Track listing ==
1. Koibumi (恋文) (Words - Kaori Mochida / music - HIKARI)
2. Good Night (Words - Kaori Mochida / music - HIKARI)
3. Koibumi (恋文) (instrumental)
4. Good Night (instrumental)

== Charts ==
Chart (2004)	Peak position
Japan Oricon Singles Chart	1
