= Many Pieces =

Studio album by Every Little Thing
- Released: March 19, 2003
- Recorded: 2001, 2002
- Genres: J-pop; pop rock; synthpop
- Length: 67:19
- Label: Avex Trax
- Producer: Max Matsuura (exec.)

Every Little Thing chronology
Cyber Trance Presents ELT Trance (2002)	Many Pieces (2003)	Every Best Single 2 (2003)

Singles from Many Pieces
- 1. "Jump" Released: October 17, 2001; 2. "Kioku" Released: May 15, 2002; 3. "Sasayaka na Inori" Released: August 16, 2002; 4. "Untitled 4 Ballads" Released: December 18, 2002; 5. "Grip!" Released: March 12, 2003

Many Pieces is the fifth album of the Japanese pop rock group Every Little Thing (ELT), released on March 19, 2003. The album peaked at number 1 on the Oricon charts. The track "Grip!" was used in the anime series Inuyasha as the fourth opening theme.

== Track listing ==
All lyrics are written by Mochida Kaori.

CD
No.	Title	Music	Arranger(s)	Length
1.	"Jump" (Jumping Mix)	Mochida Kaori	Akira Murata	4:06
2.	"Flavor"	Kunio Tago	Masafumi Nakao^{[b]}	5:27
3.	"Stray Cat"	Kazuhiro Hara	Expo	4:40
4.	"Ambivalence"	Tago	Murata^{[a]}	4:33
5.	"Sasayaka na Inori" (ささやかな祈り; A modest prayer)	Tago	Expo^{[a]}	4:56
6.	"Nostalgia"	Kazuhito Kikuchi	Tasuku^{[b]}	5:50
7.	"..." (･･･。; ten ten ten maru) (Instrumental)	D.A.I	Ichiro Ito	1:40
8.	"Kiwoku" (キヲク; Memory)	Kikuchi	Murata^{[a]}	5:27
9.	"Tie-Dye"	Tago	Tasuku^{[b]}	4:40
10.	"Grip!"	Hara	HΛL	4:50
11.	"Self Reliance"	Tago	Tasuku^{[b]}	4:11
12.	"Unspeakable"	Kikuchi	Yasuo Ohtani, Nakao^{[b]}	4:24
13.	"Ai no Uta" (愛の謳; Love song) (includes hidden track "Free Walkin'")	Tago	Murata	12:35

Notes

- ^{^a} co-arranged by Every Little Thing
- ^{^b} co-arranged by Ichiro Ito

== Charts ==
Release	Chart	Peak position	Sales total
March 19, 2003	Oricon Daily Albums Chart	1	
March 19, 2003	Oricon Weekly Albums Chart	1	526,542 copies sold
