= Mata Ashita =

Single by Every Little Thing

from the album Commonplace
- Released: November 12, 2003
- Genre: J-pop
- Length: 14:43 ("Mata Ashita", "Ichinichi no Hajimari" and "Shiawase no Fuukei" only)
- Label: avex trax
- Songwriter: Kaori Mochida

Every Little Thing singles chronology
"Fundamental Love" (2003)	"Mata Ashita" (2003)	"Soraai" (2004)

"Mata Ashita" (また あした) is the 26th single by the Japanese J-pop group Every Little Thing, released on November 12, 2003. It was used as the theme song for the drama Pure Love III.

== Track listing ==
1. Mata Ashita (また あした) (Words - Kaori Mochida / music - Hideyuki Obata)
2. Ichinichi no Hajimari ni... (一日の始まりに．．．) (Words - Kaori Mochida / music - HIKARI)
3. Shiawase no Fuukei (しあわせの風景) (Words - Kaori Mochida / music - Kazuhito Kikuchi)
4. Mata Ashita (また あした) (instrumental)
5. Ichinichi no Hajimari ni... (一日の始まりに．．．) (instrumental)
6. Shiawase no Fuukei (しあわせの風景) (instrumental)

== Charts ==
Chart (2003)	Peak position
Japan Oricon Singles Chart	3
