= Door (Every Little Thing album) =

Studio album by Every Little Thing
- Released: March 5, 2008
- Genre: J-pop; pop rock; synthpop
- Length: 54:04
- Label: Avex Trax
- Producer: {Masato Matsuura (exec.)

Every Little Thing chronology
14 Message: Every Ballad Songs 2 (2007)	Door (2008)	Every Best Singles: Complete (2009)

Singles from Door
- 1. "Kirameki Hour" Released: August 8, 2007; 2. "Koi o Shiteiru/Fuyu ga Hajimaru yo" Released: October 31, 2007; 3. "Sakurabito" Released: February 13, 2008

Door is the eighth album by the Japanese pop rock group Every Little Thing, released on March 5, 2008.

== Critical reception ==
Door
Review scores
Source	Rating
AllMusic	3/5 stars

Adam Greenberg from AllMusic stated "Every Little Thing went on an explanatory route for Door. Door is somewhat scattered, touching on basic pop, rock, ambient electronica, reggae, and much more, but never quite trying the various threads together in a convincing way."

== Track listing ==
All lyrics are written by Kaori Mochida (except track 7 written by Noriyuki Makihara).

CD
No.	Title	Music	Arranger(s)	Length
1.	"Gate #8" (Instrumental)	Ichiro Ito	Yasunari Nakamura^{[b]}	1:27
2.	"Masaka no Telepathy" (まさかのTelepathy)	Daisuke Kato	Nakamura^{[a]}	4:31
3.	"Kirameki Hour" (キラメキアワー) (Door Version)	Kunio Tago	Masafumi Hayashi^{[a]}	4:34
4.	"Paris no Musume" (パリの娘)	Hikari	Hikari^{[a]}	4:39
5.	"Sakurabito" (サクラビト)	Tago	Tomoji Sogawa^{[a]}	5:02
6.	"Wonder Land"	Daichi Hayakawa	Nakamura^{[a]}	4:21
7.	"Fuyu ga Hajimaru yo" (冬がはじまるよ) (feat. Noriyuki Makihara))	Noriyuki Makihara	Hayashi^{[a]}	4:57
8.	"B.L.V.D." (Instrumental)	Ito	Nakamura^{[b]}	1:47
9.	"Neroli"	Tago	Hayashi^{[a]}	4:44
10.	"Kara Kara" (カラカラ)	Takashi Iioka	Hayashi^{[a]}	4:06
11.	"Koi wo Shiteiru" (恋をしている)	Kazuhito Kikuchi	Nakamura^{[a]}	5:23
12.	"Gladiolus"	Yoko Kuzuya	Hayashi^{[a]}	5:23
13.	"Ophelia Act 2" (オフェリア_Act2)	Iioka	Nakamura^{[a]}	3:20

DVD
No.	Title	Length
1.	"Kirameki Hour" (Video clip)
2.	"Koi wo Shiteiru" (Video clip)
3.	"Video Clip & Photo Shoot & Recording Off-Shot" ("Kirameki Hour", "Koi wo Shiteiru", "Sakurabito" and "Door")
4.	"Koi wo Shiteiru" (from X'mas Live at Ikspiar)
5.	"Sakurabito" (Video clip - Mochida Solo version)
6.	"Sakurabito" (Video clip - Ito Solo version)
7.	"Channel-a special program «Every Little Thing: Sorezore no Kyujitsu»" (Channel-a 特別編「Every Little Thing ~それぞれの休日~」)

Notes

- ^{^a} co-arranged by Every Little Thing
- ^{^b} co-arranged by Ichiro Ito

== Charts ==
Release	Chart	Peak position	Sales total
March 2008	Oricon Daily Albums Chart	1	
March 2008	Oricon Weekly Albums Chart	2	89,894 copies sold
