= Kimi no Te =

Single by Every Little Thing

from the album Crispy Park
- Released: October 26, 2005
- Genre: J-pop
- Length: 9:32 ("Kimi no Te" and "Kaerimichi" only)
- Label: avex trax
- Songwriter: Kaori Mochida

Every Little Thing singles chronology
"Koibumi/Good Night" (2004)	"Kimi no Te" (2005)	"Azure Moon" (2006)

"Kimi no Te" (きみのて) is the 29th single by the J-pop group Every Little Thing, which was released on October 26, 2005.

== Track listing ==
1. Kimi no Te (きみのて; Your Hand) (Words - Kaori Mochida / music - HIKARI)
2. Kaeri Michi (帰り道; The Way Back) (Words - Kaori Mochida / music - tetsuhiko & Tomoji Sogawa)
3. Kimi no Te (instrumental)
4. Kaerimichi (instrumental)

== Charts ==
Oricon sales chart (Japan)

Release	Chart	Peak position	Sales total
October 26, 2005	Oricon Weekly Singles Chart	2	74,857
