= Feel My Heart =

Single by Every Little Thing

from the album Everlasting
- Released: August 7, 1996
- Genre: J-pop
- Length: 19:41 min
- Label: Avex Trax
- Songwriter(s): Mitsuru Igarashi
- Producer(s): Mitsuru Igarashi

Every Little Thing singles chronology
"Feel My Heart" (1996)	"Future World" (1996)

"Feel My Heart" is the debut single by the Japanese J-pop group Every Little Thing, released on August 7, 1996. The track was remixed by the Swiss trance producer, Moogwai, in 2002.

== Track listing ==
1. Feel My Heart — 4:22 (Words & music - Mitsuru Igarashi)
2. Feel My Heart (Daverodgers Euro mix) — 4:33
3. Feel My Heart (Club mix) — 6:24
4. Feel My Heart (instrumental) — 4:22

== Charts ==
Chart (1996)	Peak position
Japan Oricon	24

== See also ==
- Avex Network
