= Untitled 4 Ballads =

EP by Every Little Thing
- Released: December 18, 2002
- Genre: J-pop
- Length: 19:29
- Label: Avex Trax
- Producer: Max Matsuura

Every Little Thing chronology
The Remixes III: Mix Rice Plantation / Cyber Trance presents ELT Trance (2002)	Untitled 4 Ballads (2002)	Many Pieces (2003)

Untitled 4 Ballads (stylized as UNTITLED 4 ballads) is an extended play recorded by the Japanese J-pop group Every Little Thing, released on December 18, 2002, as their twenty-third single. It was their fifth single to top the Oricon chart.

"Nostalgia" was used as the theme song for the drama Okaasan to Issho.

== Track listing ==
1. "Unspeakable" (Words - Kaori Mochida / music - Kazuhito Kikuchi)
2. "Ai no Uta (愛の謳)" (Song of Love)" (Words - Kaori Mochida / music - Kunio Tago)
3. "Ruumu (ルーム, rūmu)" (Room)" (Words - Kaori Mochida / music - Kazuhito Kikuchi)
4. "Nostalgia" (Words - Kaori Mochida / music - Kazuhito Kikuchi)
5. "Unspeakable" (instrumental)
6. "Ai no Uta (愛の謳)" (instrumental)
7. "Ruumu (ルーム)" (instrumental)
8. "Nostalgia" (instrumental)

== Chart positions ==
Chart (2002)	Peak position
Japan Oricon Singles Chart	1
