= Fragile (Every Little Thing song) =

Single by Every Little Thing

from the album 4 Force
- B-side: "Jirenma"
- Released: January 1, 2001
- Recorded: August 2–10, 2000
- Genre: J-pop
- Length: 4:52
- Label: Avex Trax
- Composer: Kazuhito Kikuchi
- Lyricist: Kaori Mochida
- Producer: Max Matsuura

Every Little Thing singles chronology
| "Ai no Kakera" (2000) | "Fragile" / "Jirenma" (2001) | "Graceful World" (2001) |

"Fragile" is a single by the J-pop group Every Little Thing, released as their eighteenth single on January 1, 2001. It was their fourth single to top the Oricon chart.

"Fragile" is the theme music of Fuji Television's Ainori, broadcast between October 2000 and September 2001. It is also the theme music of original video animation Fragtime, an anime adaption produced by Tear Studio and based on the manga of the same title. It was also used as the fourth insert song for the romance anime Tsuki ga Kirei (2017), covered by Nao Tōyama. Its cover version by Rie Takahashi was used as the third ending theme music for Teasing Master Takagi-san: The Movie (2022). The single was released with "Jirenma", used as the ending theme song for Initial D Third Stage.

== Track listing ==
1. Fragile (Words - Kaori Mochida / music - Kazuhito Kikuchi)
2. Jirenma (Words - Kaori Mochida / music - Ichiro Ito)
3. Jirenma (FPM Young Soul mix)
4. Fragile (instrumental)
5. Jirenma (instrumental)

== Charts ==
| Chart (2001) | Peak position |
|---|---|
| Japan Oricon | 1 |

== Remixes ==
- "White Roses Remix" by Laurent Newfield: Super Eurobeat Presents Euro Every Little Thing
- "Eurobeat Mix" by Laurent Newfield: J-Euro Non-Stop Best
