= Ai no Kakera =

2000 single by Every Little Thing

Single by Every Little Thing

from the album 4 Force
- Released: October 18, 2000
- Genre: J-pop
- Length: 4:55 (Ai no Kakera only)
- Label: avex trax
- Songwriter(s): Kaori Mochida

Every Little Thing singles chronology
"Rescue Me/Smile Again" (2000)	"Ai no Kakera" (2000)	"Fragile/Jirenma" (2001)

"Ai no Kakera" (愛のカケラ), literally "Love's Fragment", is a song by the J-pop duo Every Little Thing, released as their seventeenth single on October 18, 2000.

== Track listing ==
1. Ai no Kakera (愛のカケラ) (Words - Kaori Mochida / music - Kunio Tago)
2. Ai no Kakera (愛のカケラ) (Steppin' Hard Enough mix)
3. Ai no Kakera (愛のカケラ) (Cat Walk mix)
4. Ai no Kakera (愛のカケラ) (instrumental)

== Charts ==
Chart (2000)	Peak position
Japan Oricon	2
