= Time Goes By =

1998 single by Every Little Thing

Single by Every Little Thing

from the album Time to Destination
- Language: Japanese, English
- Released: February 11, 1998
- Genre: J-pop
- Length: 5:11
- Label: Avex Trax
- Songwriter(s): Mitsuru Igarashi

Every Little Thing singles chronology
"Face the Change" (1998)	"Time Goes By" (1998)	"Forever Yours" (1998)

Music video
- "Time goes by" on YouTube

"Time Goes By" is a song by the Japanese J-pop group Every Little Thing. It was released as their eighth single on February 11, 1998. The song was used as the theme song for the Japanese drama Amai Kekkon. It charted in Oricon singles chart for 18 weeks, reaching the peak at second place. The single was sold over one million records, in turn receiving Million Seller certification from Recording Industry Association of Japan.

== Track listing ==
(According to Oricon)

1. Time Goes By
2. Time Goes By (Bad Attitude mix)
3. Time Goes By (instrumental)

== Charts ==
=== Weekly charts ===
Weekly chart performance for "Time Goes By"
Chart (1998)	Peak position
Japan (Oricon)	2

== Cover versions ==
- Hideaki Tokunaga covered the song on his 2007 album Vocalist 3.
- Eric Martin covered the song in English on his 2008 album Mr. Vocalist.
- Juju covered the song on her 2010 album Request.
- Naoya Urata covered the song on his 2013 cover album Unchanged.
