= Kazuhito Kikuchi =

Japanese composer (born 1977)

Kazuhito Kikuchi 菊池 一仁
- Born: 15 October 1977 (age 48); Tokyo, Japan
- Genre: J-pop
- Occupation: Composer
- Years active: 2000s–present
- Formerly of: Breath

Kazuhito Kikuchi (菊池 一仁, Kikuchi Kazuhito; born 15 October 1977 in Tokyo) is a Japanese composer. From 2001 to 2005, he was a member of the J-pop duo Breath.

He has been one of the main composers for Ayumi Hamasaki and has also written songs for Koda Kumi, Every Little Thing, Ami Suzuki, and others.

He won the Best Composer Award at the Japan Record Awards in 2001 for the single "Fragile" by Every Little Thing. In 2002, his song "Kioku" sung by Every Little Thing received a Gold Award at the Japan Record Awards.

He was the composer for the Chinese singer Alan Dawa Dolma.

In 2021 he founded, and was the producer and composer for, the Japanese girl group et-and-. The group disbanded in 2025.
