= Ichiro Ito =

Japanese guitarist

Ichiro Ito 伊藤 一朗
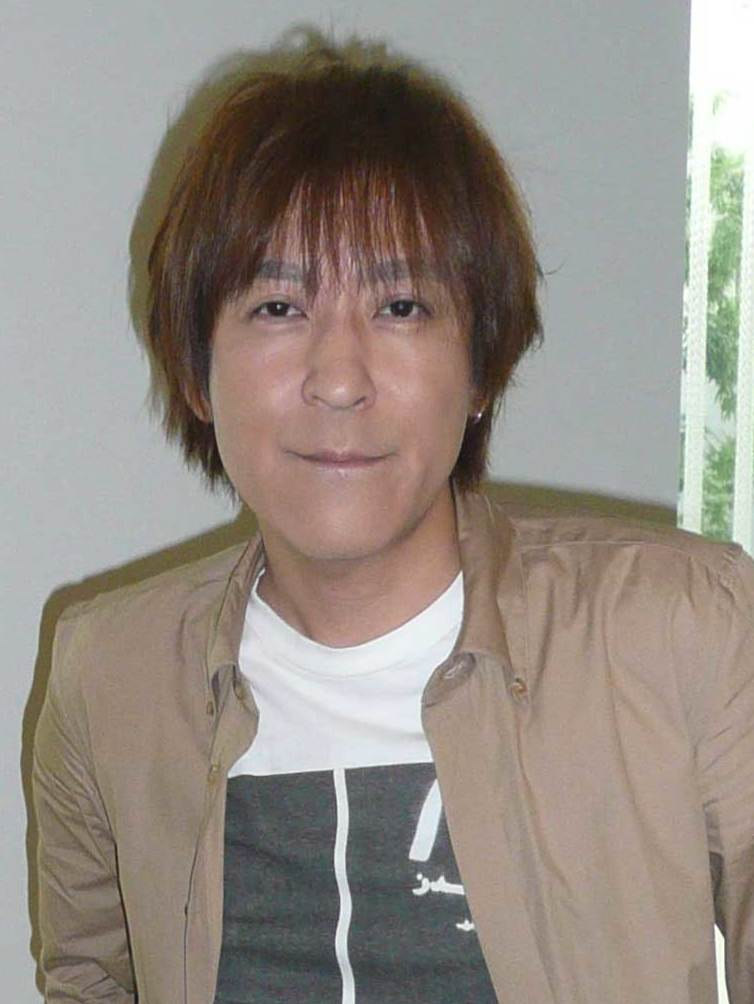
- Ito in 2008

Background information
- Born: 10 November 1967 (age 58); Yokosuka, Kanagawa
- Genres: Rock, pop
- Instrument: Guitar
- Years active: 1996–present
- Label: Avex Trax
- Member of: Every Little Thing
- Website: www.avexnet.or.jp/itoichiro/index.html

Ichiro Ito (伊藤 一朗, Itō Ichirō; born 10 November 1967) is a guitarist in the Japanese rock band Every Little Thing. Ito also works in composition and, sometimes, arrangement of some of Every Little Thing's songs.

== Solo discography ==
=== Albums ===
- Diversity (2009)

== Other programs ==
Ito Ichiro has made regular guest cast appearances in Gaki no Tsukai's annual 24 hour batsu games. He often portrays himself as a soft-spoken guy in the annual event and is often subjected to being pinched in the nose or ear by a Kuwagata Beetle, known as Stag Beetle in English.
