= Mitsuru Igarashi =

Japanese musician (born 1969)

- Born: 17 May 1969 (age 55); Tokyo
- Genres: Japanese Pop
- Occupation(s): Keyboardist, record producer
- Labels: Avex Trax
- Formerly of: Every Little Thing
- Website: iggy326.syncl.jp

Mitsuru Igarashi (五十嵐 充, Igarashi Mitsuru, born 17 May 1969 in Tokyo) is the former keyboardist and songwriter of Japanese pop group Every Little Thing. He founded the band in early 1996 with his old friend Ichirō Itō and then 18-year-old singer Kaori Mochida. He left Every Little Thing in April 2000 after releasing the third album, Eternity. Since leaving the band, he started producing music for the band Day After Tomorrow which disbanded in 2005. Currently he plays keyboards and is a songmaker and producer in band Rushmore. He was also involved in composing and writing song lyrics for Every Little Thing's ninth album, Change.
