= Every Little Thing (band) =

Japanese musical duo

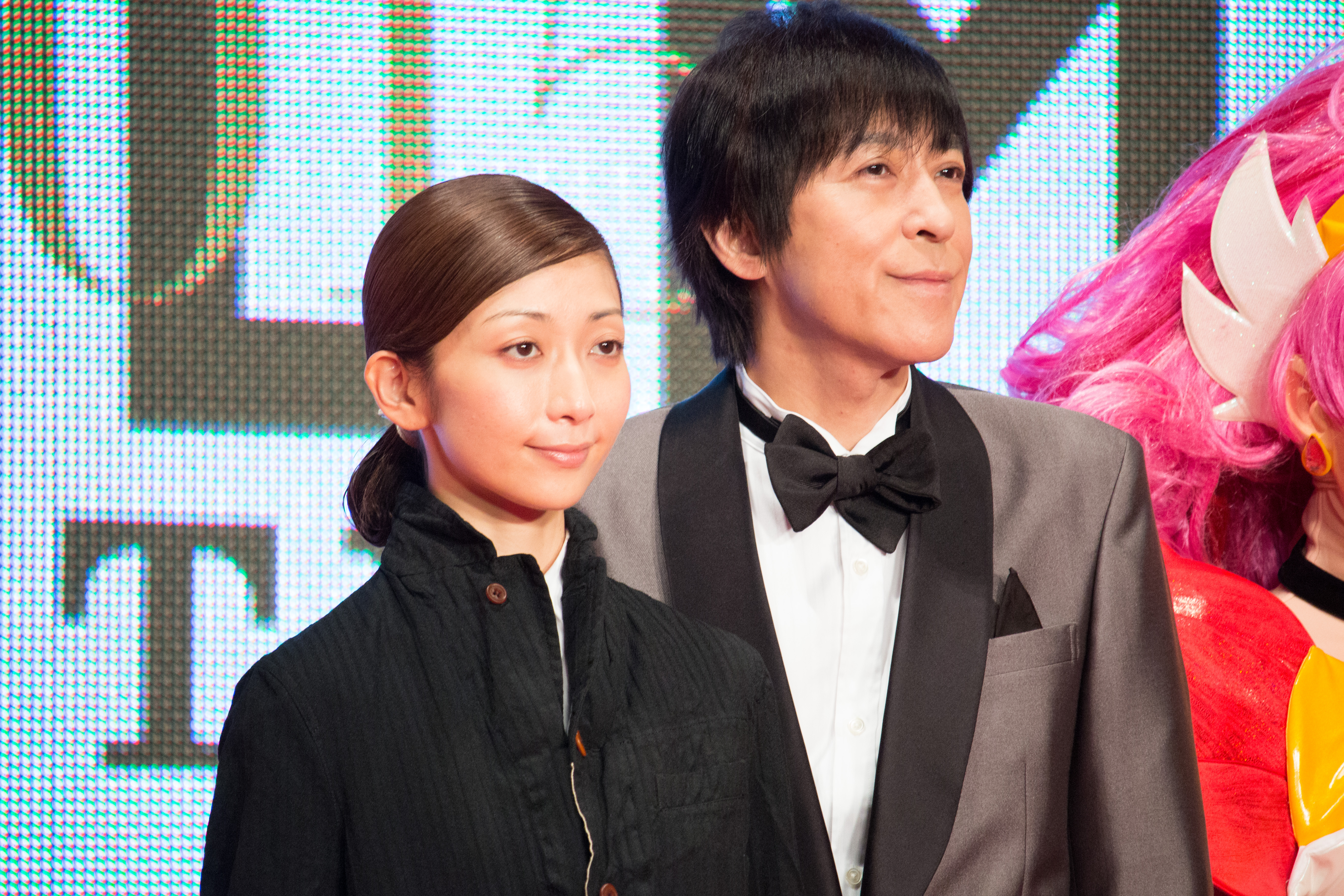
- Every Little Thing at the Tokyo International Film Festival 2015. Kaori Mochida (left) and Ichiro Ito.

Background information
- Origin: Tokyo, Japan
- Genres: Pop rock; soft rock; synthpop
- Years active: 1996–present
- Label: Avex Trax
- Members: Kaori Mochida; Ichiro Ito
- Past members: Mitsuru Igarashi
- Website: www.avexnet.or.jp/elt/

Every Little Thing (also known as ELT by their fans) is a pop/soft rock duo from Japan who debuted in August 1996 with the release of their first single called "Feel My Heart". Their name is usually written in English, and only rarely in katakana. They gained massive popularity in the late 1990s and early 2000s. As of 2013, Every Little Thing has sold over 23 million copies of singles and albums throughout Japan. Their second studio album, Time to Destination, is the best-selling album of the band with over 3.5 million copies sold, and became the 10th best-selling album of all time in Japan.

Every Little Thing was originally a trio but became a duo in 2000 with Kaori Mochida as the singer and Ichiro Ito as the guitarist. Mitsuru Igarashi, former composer for the band, left ELT following the release of their third original album, Eternity.

== Biography ==
=== Early careers ===
Ito began playing guitar in local bands around the US Yokota Air Base in Fussa, Tokyo, performing cover versions of songs by rock acts like Van Halen to local sailors. He initially intended to play drums.

Mochida made her debut as a baby in an advertisement for diapers as her mom hoped she would enter the entertainment business. In 1991, at the age of 13, she joined the eight-member girl group The Kuro Buta All-Stars. Though not successful, the experience convinced her to record a two track demo, featuring the two songs, "Mouichido" (The Kuro Buta All-Stars) and a cover song from 1970s/1980s singer-songwriter Mariya Takeuchi.

She sent the demo to Avex Trax, where Mitsuru Igarashi was a producer looking for a girl for a new duo with him as the keyboardist. Impressed by her strong yet sweet voice, Igarashi asked her to join as a duo, and then asked his guitarist friend Ichiro Ito, then working as a studio receptionist, to help on the first single "Feel My Heart", created by Igarashi. Ito, over ten years Mochida's senior, has said that when first meeting the young Mochida wearing gyaru style thick platform boots, he didn't even know how to strike up conversation.

=== Debut and success ===
The band released their debut single "Feel My Heart" on August 7, 1996. The single peaked at number 24 on the Oricon charts. Their first studio album, called Everlasting was a big success, selling nearly two million copies in Japan, and marking ELT as a popular group with a bright future. The band reached number 1 at the Oricon charts for the first time with their fourth single, "For the Moment."

Their second studio album, entitled Time to Destination, was released on April 15, 1998, and it became one of the best-selling albums of that year, with over 3.5 million copies sold. The album ended up being the band's best-selling album, as well as the 10th best-selling album of all time in Japan. This album also included their best-selling single, "Time Goes By", which reached nearly 1.15 million copies sold.

=== Departure of Igarashi and change in sound ===
Upon the release of the third studio album, Eternity, released in March 2000, Mitsuru Igarashi suddenly decided to leave the band. Ito later said that the decision was dropped on them without warning, right before a tour, and it forced them to change their sound. The remaining duo decided to tour acoustically for the next two years in order to find their feet, but also enjoyed more creative freedom over the songs. The single "Rescue me" was the last that Igarashi participated in and with the release of their 16th single, "Ai no Kakera" in October 2000, ELT transitioned their style from Igarashi's signature synthesized pop-rock sound to a more acoustic soft-rock sound. Their single "Fragile" released on New Year's Day 2001 became ELT's second biggest hit ever, vindicating their new direction, selling approximately 829,580 copies; its c/w song "Jirenma" was one of the ending songs for the anime movie Initial D Third Stage. their fourth album and first as a duo, 4 Force, was released on March 22, 2001. The album was their first not to top the Japanese Oricon charts, but still managed to sell more than a million copies and was awarded as "Album of the Year" at the Japan Gold Disc Awards.

In 2003 the band released their fifth album, Many Pieces, which topped the Oricon charts. The album had five promotional singles prior to its release, including "Jump", the first attempt of Mochida in music composing, Untitled: 4 Ballads, their number one EP which got platinum status in Japan, and also "Grip!", which was used as an opening theme of anime television series InuYasha.

In November 2004 the duo released their single "Koibumi" that was a surprise for many, because it performed comparatively well on the charts, selling more than many of their previous singles. In 2005 they released only one single, the soft rock song "Kimi no Te", and the acoustic compilation album Acoustic : Latte.

During Every Little Thing's 2004–2005 Commonplace Tour, Mochida suffered from bronchitis which further affected her singing style during the tour as well as on their 7th album, Crispy Park, released on August 9, 2006 (their 10th anniversary day). Mochida’s singing style has changed slightly on every album, going from a clear, soothing voice to a high and cuter voice. A 2006–2007 concert tour followed their tenth anniversary album release. Their 31st single, "Swimmy", theme song for the drama series Kekkon Dekinai Otoko, was released in October 2006.

=== Tenth anniversary and solo endeavours ===
For celebrating their tenth anniversary, Every Little Thing held a two-day special live at the Nippon Budokan on March 6 and 7, 2006. Their 2008 album Door released on March 5, 2008 peaked at number 2 on the Oricon charts. Mochida has said of the album, that "I used to sing without thinking. But now I convey thoughts that are hard to explain when I communicate with people in my daily life. It's harder than before; but we reap much more joy."

On November 20, 2008, it was announced that Mochida would be starting a solo career in 2009, but both she and Itoh would continue as a duo. In this period both members released solo material. Mochida released her first solo album, Moka on August 12, 2009, and also participated briefly in the special unit Caocao, along with Takao Tajima, member of Original Love. On August 5, 2009, Ito released a mini-album on his own titled Diversity, which featured vocals of Idoling!!!, Ayuse Kozue, and others.

In 2009, after nine years of departed ways, Every Little Thing began working again with former band member Mitsuru Igarashi. Igarashi composed and produced several songs on the band's ninth album Change, released in March 2010, including its three promotional singles: "Dream Goes On", "Tsumetai Ame" and the album title song.

In July, 2011, the band released their 41st single "Sora/Koe". Both songs were used as theme songs of the 2011 Pokémon movie. On September 21, 2011, the band released their tenth album, Ordinary, which debuted at number 2 on the Oricon charts.

In 2013 they toured promoting their "On N On" single, which portrays a timeline of their performance history.

== Members ==
=== Current members ===
- Kaori Mochida – vocalist, songwriter
- Ichiro Ito – guitarist, composer, arranger

=== Former member ===
- Mitsuru Igarashi – keyboardist, producer, songwriter (1996–2000)

=== Support members ===
- Genya Kuwajima – keyboardist (1996–2001)
- Keiichi "K-1" Kodo – drummer (1996–2001)
- Takeshi Asada – bassist (1996–2001)
- Kaoru Kato – guitarist (1996–2007)
- Tsunehiko Yashiro – keyboardist (2000–2001)
- Masafumi "Massy" Hayashi – keyboardist (2001–2014)
- Taka Yamaguchi – drummer (2001–2012)
- Tanahashi "UNA" Nobuhito – band manipulation, live arrangement (2001–2004)
- Satoshi "Anthony" Yamada – bassist (2002–2005)
- Yasunari "Nam-Nam" Nakamura – band manipulation, live arrangement (2004–2011)
- Naoki Kasahara – bassist (2005–present)
- Tomoji Sogawa – band manipulation, live arrangement (2011–2014)
- Koji Matsukawa – drummer (2013–2014)
- Taisei Iwasaki – keyboardist, guitarist, live arrangement (2015–present)
- Makoto Tanaka – keyboardist (2015–present)
- Ken Higeshiro – drummer (2015–present)
- Megumi Yamaguchi – Chorus (2015–present)
- Fire Horns – Wind (2015–present)

== Discography ==
- Everlasting (1997)
- Time to Destination (1998)
- Eternity (2000)
- 4 Force (2001)
- Many Pieces (2003)
- Commonplace (2004)
- Crispy Park (2006)
- Door (2008)
- Change (2010)
- Ordinary (2011)
- Fun-Fare (2014)
- Tabitabi (2015)

== Concerts and tours ==
- May 31, 1998 - August 4, 1998: Concert Tour'98 Time to Destination
- April 1, 2000 - June 3, 2000: Concert Tour Spirit 2000
- May 19, 2001 - July 22, 2001: Concert Tour 2001 4 Force
- December 30–31, 2001: Count Down Live 2001-2002 HORSE
- December 19, 2002: 2002 Christmas Special Concert
- May 10, 2003 - July 8, 2003: 2003 Tour Many Pieces
- December 23–24, 2003: X'mas Acoustic Live 2003
- October 17, 2004 - April 8, 2005: Commonplace Tour 2004 - 2005
- X'mas Acoustic Live at Urakami Tenshudō(Urakami Cathedral) ~Ai no Uta~ (浦上天主堂〜愛の謳〜)
- October 7, 2006 - January 25, 2007: Concert Tour 2006 - 2007 Crispy Park
- March 6–7, 2007: Every Little Thing 10th Anniversary Special Live at Nippon Budokan
- April 12, 2008 - June 15, 2008: Concert Tour 2008 Door
- December 7–8&11, 2008: Every Little Thing X'mas Concert 2008
- December 23–24, 2009: Every Little Thing Premium Christmas Concert 2009
- October 22, 2009 - March 28, 2010: Concert Tour 2009 - 2010 Meet
- December 7, 2010 - December 23, 2010: Premium Christmas Concert Tour 2010
- October 1, 2011 - April 1, 2012: Every Little Thing 15th Anniversary Concert Tour 2011 - 2012 "Ordinary"
- February 18–19, 2012: Every Little Thing 15th Anniversary Premium 2 days ~naEverLasTing 2012~
- January 26, 2013 - June 15, 2013: Every Little Thing Concert Tour 2013 -On And On-
- February 22, 2014 - July 6, 2014: Every Little Thing Concert Tour 2014 -Fun Fare-
- October 17, 2015 - April 2, 2016: Every Little Thing 20th Anniversary Best Hit Tour 2015 - 2016 ~Tabitabi~

== See also ==
- List of best-selling music artists in Japan
