= Kaori Mochida =

Kaori Mochida 持田 香織
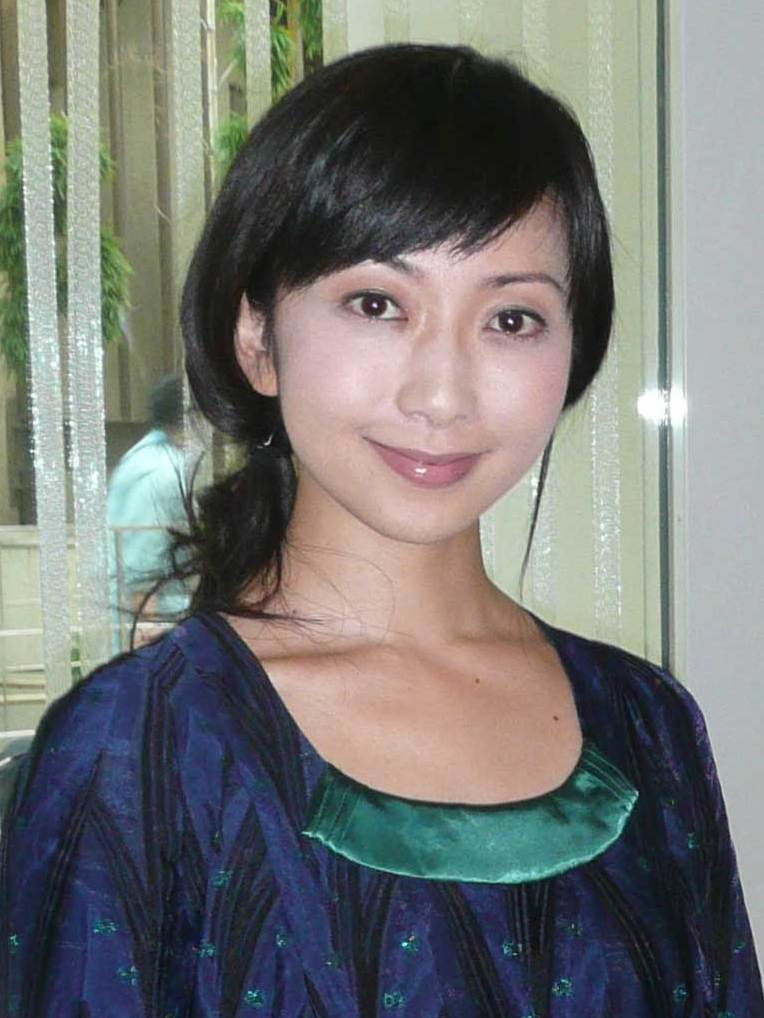
- Mochida in 2008

Background information
- Also known as: Mocchi
- Born: March 24, 1978 (age 48); Tokyo, Japan
- Genres: Japanese pop
- Occupations: Singer; songwriter
- Instrument: Vocals
- Years active: 1985–present
- Label: Avex Trax
- Member of: Every Little Thing
- Website: www.avexnet.or.jp/mochida

Kaori Mochida (持田 香織, Mochida Kaori; born March 24, 1978) is the lead singer of Japanese pop group Every Little Thing.

== Biography ==
Mochida began her career as a child actress, appearing in magazines and TV commercials. She then became a member of the second generation of idol group The Kuro Buta All-Stars, and entered the entertainment world as "持田かおり" (Kaori Mochida, with Kaori written in hiragana). Shortly after, she released her first single as a solo artist, titled "Mō Ichido" in November 1993. She didn't decide to become a singer professionally until she was in high school.

=== 1995—2001: Every Little Thing debut ===
In 1995, she met Mitsuru Igarashi, and signed to the Avex label. At first she was meant to debut as a solo artist, but as Max Matsuura suggested, she then formed a duo with Igarashi, and then a trio when Ichiro Ito was incorporated as a guitarist. They debuted in 1996 with "Feel My Heart". Following her debut with Every Little Thing, Mochida became a popular fashion icon in Japan, and started to appear in TV commercials for a wide variety of beauty products. The spots that she starred in usually used the songs of her band as background music. After the departure of Mitsuru Igarashi from Every Little Thing in 2000, Mochida started to have more input into the band's creative process. The first song for Every Little Thing that she wrote lyrics for was "All Along" from the Time to Destination album, and the first song she composed was "Jump", released as a single in 2001.

She did not release any solo music until 2002, when she participated in the Avex charity project Song+Nation, where she recorded the song "In Case of Me", produced by Tetsuya Komuro. In 2004, she released "Itsunomanika Shōjo wa", a cover of Yosui Inoue. In 2006, she wrote Haruka Ayase's debut single "Period" along with Takeshi Kobayashi, and in 2007, she wrote "Sarai no Kaze" for May and "Going Back Home" for Mika Nakashima. Mochida also provided vocals for Dragon Ash's song "Wipe Your Eyes" that same year.

=== 2009—2011: Solo debut, Moka, Niu ===
In 2009, Mochida's solo career officially started, and she started to work on her first solo album. She released her first official solo single, "Ame no Walts", on January 28, 2009. The song was credited as a collaboration between Mochida and Sakerock, a Japanese instrumental band. In March she and Takao Tajima from Original Love formed a special group called Caocao, and recorded a cover of "Kojin Jugyo" by Finger 5. The song was used as theme song for the movie Oppai Volleyball. In July she released a double A-side single entitled "Shizuka na Yoru/Weather", and a month later, on August 12, she released her first solo album, Moka. The album featured collaborations with several artists, such as Lisa Ono, Ikuko Harada, Yuichi Ohata, Bic Runga, ohashiTrio, and Sean Lennon. It debuted at number 9 in the Oricon charts and enjoyed moderated success.

On August 25, 2009, her second album, Niu, was released. The album had no commercial singles, except for a CD single of "Green", that was included in a special edition of fashion magazine Journal Standard. For this album she made her first domestic solo tour between September and October.

=== 2012—2019: Manu a Manu, Ten to Ten ===
On August 1, 2012, her third solo album Manu a Manu was released. The song "Utsukushiki Uruwashiki Hibi" was used as theme song for TV Tokyo drama Cleopatra na Onna-tachi. In 2019, Mochida released her first mini album Ten to Ten to mark the tenth anniversary of her solo debut.

=== 2021—present: Sen, qq ===
On June 23, 2021, Sen was released as Mochida's second EP. It included the song "Still Swimmy", the theme song of the 2019 drama The Man Who Still Can't Get Married, and "Jasmine", which was used in advertisements for Menard Fairlucent skincare. This was followed by qq, a third EP released on May 16, 2025. Mochida is credited as the composer and producer of all five songs. When describing the album's concept, the singer cited a wish to make music that felt "nostalgic and warm", and to link the things she loves together.

== Solo discography ==
=== Albums ===
- Moka (2009)
- Niu (2010)
- Manu a Manu (2012)

=== EPs ===
- Ten to Ten (2019)
- Sen (2021)
- qq (2025)

==== Singles ====
Year	Title	Peak (Oricon)	Album
1993	"Mō Ichido"	14	—
2004	"Itsunomanika Shōjo wa" (いつのまにか少女は)	15	—
2009	"Ame no Waltz" (雨のワルツ)	11	Moka
2009	"Kojin Jugyō" (個人授業) (as Caocao)	22	—
2009	"Shizuka na Yoru/Weather" (静かな夜/weather)	20	Moka
2010	"Green/Acacia" (green／アカシア)	—	Niu
2011	"To"	26	Manu a Manu
2012	"Megumi/Kanashii Toki mo Ureshii Toki mo" (めぐみ/悲しいときも嬉しいときも)	24	Manu a Manu
2012	"Utsukushiki Uruwashiki Hibi" (美しき麗しき日々)	29	Manu a Manu

=== Other appearances ===
Year	Song	Album
1999	"Kiyoshi kono Yoru" (きよしこの夜) (Accapella Gospel Version)	Avex the Album
2002	"In Case of Me"	Song+Nation
2002	"In Case of Me (Tatsumaki Remix)"	Song+Nation 2 -Trance-
2006	"Futari no Ongaku" (ふたりの音楽) (Yuichi Ohata with Kaori Mochida)	Futatsu no Asa
2007	"Wipe Your Eyes" (Dragon Ash feat. Kaori Mochida from ELT)	The Best of Dragon Ash with Changes Vol.2
2008	"Atarashii Asa" (あたらしい朝) (Yuichi Ohata with Kaori Mochida)	Music From The Magic Shop
2010	"Sorairo no Crayon" (空いろのくれよん) (Happy End cover)	Matsumoto Takashi ni Sasagu: Kazemachi DNA
2011	"Pocket" (Nobuyuki Nakajima w/ Kaori Mochida)	Pianona

== Other works ==
- Mochida provided vocals for the song "In Case of Me" on the 2002 charity album Song Nation. "In Case of Me" was written by Tetsuya Komuro and produced by Komuro and Max Matsuura.
- In 2006, Mochida along with Takeshi Kobayashi wrote the lyrics for the single "Period" (ピリオド) by Haruka Ayase.
