= The Remixes III: Mix Rice Plantation =

Remix album by Every Little Thing
- Released: February 27, 2002
- Genres: J-pop; house
- Length: 70:01
- Label: Avex Trax

Every Little Thing chronology
Every Ballad Songs (2001)	The Remixes III: Mix Rice Plantation (2002)	Many Pieces (2003)

The Remixes III: Mix Rice Plantation is the third remix album by Japanese duo Every Little Thing. It was released simultaneously with house remixes compilation Cyber Trance presents ELT Trance on February 27, 2002, by Avex Trance. The album contains remixes of tracks from their single "Forever Yours" to "Jump". As their third remix album, this one diverged considerably much from its predecessors, distancing from dance house remixes similar to their previous remixes and focusing on experimental house music, which includes elements of bossa nova and downtempo music.

The leading song of the album was the Cubismo Grafico remix for "Jump". This is the only remix of Every Little Thing that has had a music video made for it. This music video was included as a bonus track on DVD The Video Compilation III. also, an alternative version of the remix was included as a b-side on the "Jump" single.

== Track listing ==
No.	Title	Remixer(s)	Length
1.	"Jump" (Cbsmgrfc Obrigado Mix)	Cubismo Grafico	6:19
2.	"Over and Over" (A Mais Querida Remix)	Sunaga T Experience	5:02
3.	"Forever Yours" (Sunflower Mix)	K-Taro	4:58
4.	"The One Thing" (Cbsmgrfc Topgear Mix)	Cubismo Grafico	5:28
5.	"Ai no Kakera" (愛のカケラ) (Smoove Mix)	Hitoshi Harukawa	4:57
6.	"Sure" (Grow Sound Mix)	DJ Soma; Hitoshi Harukawa	4:32
7.	"Smile Again" (Jin Jin Mix)	K-Taro	4:37
8.	"Fragile" (FPM Bitter Sweet Samba Mix)	Fantastic Plastic Machine	5:00
9.	"Graceful World" (Promised Mix)	K-Taro	7:22
10.	"Rescue Me" (Grow Sound Mix)	B.K.O.; DJ Soma	7:22
11.	"Necessary" (Feeling Is Jammin' Mix)	Hitoshi Harukawa	4:40
12.	"Get Into A Groove" (Sunaga't Experience's Remix)	Sunaga T Experience	5:03
13.	"Kimochi" (キモチ) (Cbsmgrfc Blissfull Mix)	Cubismo Grafico	5:03
Total length:			70:01

== Chart positions ==
Chart performance for The Remixes III: Mix Rice Plantation
Chart (2024)	Peak position
Japan (Oricon)	19
