= Every Ballad Songs =

- Cover to the standard edition of the album

Greatest hits album by Every Little Thing
- Released: December 5, 2001
- Genre: J-pop
- Label: AVEX Trax

Every Little Thing chronology
Super Eurobeat Presents Euro Every Little Thing (2001)	Every Ballad Songs (2001)	The Remixes III: Mix Rice Plantation (2002)

Every Ballad Songs is the second best of album of the Japanese pop group Every Little Thing, released on December 5, 2001.

== Track listing ==
1. "Over And Over"
2. "Time Goes By"
3. "Ai no Kakera (愛のカケラ; Fragment of Love?)"
4. "Azayaka na Mono (鮮やかなもの?)"
5. "Futari de Jidai o Kaete Mitai (二人で時代を変えてみたい?)"
6. "Ima Demo... Anata ga Suki Dakara (今でも・・・あなたが好きだから?)"
7. "I'll Get over You"
8. "Fragile"
9. "The One Thing"
10. "One"
11. "Sure"
12. "All along"

=== BONUS CD ===
※Only Limited Edition

1. "Silent Night" (ELT Special Version)
2. "White Christmas" (ELT Special Version)

== Charts ==
Chart (2001)	Peak position
Japan Oricon Singles Chart	2
