= Cielito Querido Café =

Mexican coffee shop chain

Coordinates: 19°22′39.49″N 99°15′14.5″W

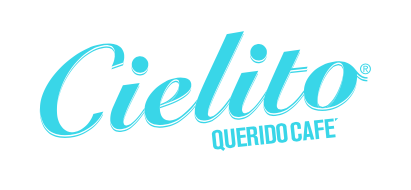
- Type: Public
- Industry: Coffee shop
- Founded: 2010; 16 years ago
- Founder: ADO Group
- Headquarters: Mexico City
- Website: cielitoquerido.com.mx/

Cielito Querido Café is a Mexican coffee shop chain inspired by Latin American history that sells typical Mexican beverages and foods. Brenda Montero is the current CEO of the company. The brand vends typical Mexican products including chamoyadas, hot horchata, café de olla, ponche, and sweet bread.

== History ==
The company was started in 2010 by Grupo ADO, a company of passenger transportation in southeastern Mexico, completing a project that was conceived for eight months in the minds of entrepreneurs and designers Nacho Cadena and Héctor Esrrawe.

== Concept ==
Cielito Querido is a neo-retro chain concept whose products are Mexican, and it does not adhere to the one-size-fits-all standard of global coffee shops. The coffee shop chain is inspired by Latin American culture and uses some colonial influences. The theme of the company is inspired by illustrated graphics from the late nineteenth and early twentieth centuries. Cielito Querido Café has 100% Mexican suppliers and producers from the main coffee and chocolate manufacturers located in Oaxaca, Chiapas and Veracruz. Its name comes from Mexican popular music, inspired by the song "Cielito Lindo" written in 1882 by the Mexican composer Quirino Mendoza y Cortéz forming a play on words with another famous Mexican song which is "Mexico Lindo y Querido" by the Mexican composer Chucho Monge. Their mission is "to regain the market in a nostalgic, cheerful, dynamic and highly diverse way".

== Business model ==
The company hopes to expand in the Mexican market with a café in each major neighborhood rather than on every street corner. The competitors of Cielito Querido Café include: Starbucks, Café Punta del Cielo, The Italian Coffee Company, and Juan Valdéz. Cielito Querido Café currently holds 2.8% of the Mexican café market.

The brand currently operates 55 coffee shops, including in Mexico City, Querétaro, Toluca, Cuernavaca and Puebla. Cielito Querido Café has been imitated in Belgium and Peru.
