= Alma Cogan discography =

- Studio albums: 7
- EPs: 5
- Compilation albums: 20
- Singles: 78

This is the discography of English singer Alma Cogan.

== Albums ==
=== Studio albums ===
Title	Album details
I Love to Sing	Released: January 1958; Label: His Master's Voice; Formats: LP
With You in Mind	Released: June 1961; Label: Columbia; Formats: LP
Oliver!	Released: January 1962; Label: His Master's Voice; Formats: LP; London studio cast recording from the musical of the same name; Cogan sings on four tracks
How About Love!	Released: December 1962; Label: Columbia; Formats: LP
Alma Cogan	Released: 1965; Label: Columbia; Formats: LP; Sweden-only release
Alma	Released: September 1967; Label: Columbia; Formats: LP
'Julie' the Musical	Released: 21 June 2010; Label: Stage Door; Formats: CD; Limited release of previously unreleased concept album from 1965; Cogan sings on nine tracks

=== Compilation albums ===
Title	Album details
The Girl with the Laugh in Her Voice	Released: May 1970; Label: Music for Pleasure; Formats: LP
The Alma Cogan Collection	Released: April 1977; Label: One-Up; Formats: LP
Second Collection	Released: November 1978; Label: One-Up; Formats: LP
The Very Best of Alma Cogan	Released: February 1984; Label: Music for Pleasure; Formats: LP, MC
A Celebration	Released: 1987; Label: EMI; Formats: 2xLP
The Almanac	Released: 1990; Label: Music for Pleasure; Formats: 2xCD, 2xLP
The Best of the EMI Years	Released: 1991; Label: EMI; Formats: CD, MC
The A–Z of Alma	Released: October 1994; Label: EMI; Formats: 3xCD
EMI Presents the Magic of Alma Cogan	Released: 19 May 1997; Label: EMI/Music for Pleasure; Formats: CD, MC
The Girl with the Laugh in Her Voice	Released: 5 November 2001; Label: EMI; Formats: 4xCD
The Ultimate Alma Cogan	Released: July 2002; Label: EMI; Formats: CD
Life Is Just a Bowl of Cherries – 25 Classic Tracks	Released: 30 May 2005; Label: EMI; Formats: CD
Celebration – The Ultimate Collection	Released: 1 May 2006; Label: EMI; Formats: 3xCD
The Essential Collection	Released: 10 September 2007; Label: Avid Entertainment; Formats: 2xCD
Bell Bottoms, Dreamboats, Tangos & Eskimos	Released: 29 September 2008; Label: Acrobat Music; Formats: 4xCD
Dreamboat Her 31 Finest: 1953–1956	Released: 27 October 2008; Label: Retrospective; Formats: CD
He Just Couldn't Resist Her – The Very Best of Alma Cogan	Released: 11 March 2016; Label: Jasmine; Formats: CD
The Essential Recordings	Released: 26 May 2017; Label: Primo; Formats: 2xCD
Two Classic Albums Plus Singles 1952–1962	Released: 20 January 2017; Label: Real Gone Music; Formats: 4xCD
The Very Best of Alma Cogan	Released: 23 October 2020; Label: One Day Music; Formats: 2xCD

== EPs ==
Title (Note: This is a list of EPs released in the UK. Various other EPs were released elsewhere.)	Details
"The Girl with a Laugh in Her Voice"	Released: September 1955; Label: His Master's Voice
"The Girl with a Laugh in Her Voice" (No. 2)	Released: 1955; Label: His Master's Voice
"The Girl with a Laugh in Her Voice" (No. 3)	Released: June 1956; Label: His Master's Voice
The Hits from My Fair Lady	Released: 1958; Label: His Master's Voice; Split EP with Ronnie Hilton
She Loves to Sing	Released: March 1959; Label: His Master's Voice

== Singles ==
Title	Year	Peak chart positions				
Title	Year	UK	AUS	FIN	GER	SWE
"To Be Worthy of You" b/w "Would You"	1952	—	—	—	—	—
"The Homing Waltz" (with Larry Day) b/w "To Be Loved by You"	1952	—	—	—	—	—
"Waltz of Paree" b/w "Pretty Bride"	1952	—	—	—	—	—
"Blue Tango" b/w "Half as Much"	1952	—	—	—	—	—
"I Went to Your Wedding" b/w "You Belong to Me"	1952	—	—	—	—	—
"Take Me in Your Arms and Hold Me" b/w "Wyoming Lullaby"	1952	—	—	—	—	—
"Till I Waltz Again with You" b/w ""Happy Valley Sweetheart"	1953	—	—	—	—	—
"Hold Me, Thrill Me, Kiss Me" b/w ""If I Had a Penny	1953	—	—	—	—	—
"On the First Warm Day" (with Les Howard) b/w "The Windsor Waltz" (by Les Howard)	1953	—	—	—	—	—
"Till They've All Gone Home" b/w "Hug Me a Hug (Kiss Me a Kiss)" (with Les Howard)	1953	—	—	—	—	—
"If I Had a Golden Umbrella" b/w "Mystery St."	1953	—	—	—	—	—
"My Love, My Love" b/w "Wasted Tears"	1953	—	—	—	—	—
"Over and Over Again" (both sides with Les Howard) b/w "Isn't Life Wonderful"	1953	—	—	—	—	—
"Ricochet (Rick-O-Shay)" b/w "The Moon Is Blue"	1953	—	—	—	—	—
"Bell Bottom Blues" b/w "Love Me Again"	1954	4	—	—	—	—
"Make Love to Me" b/w "Said the Little Moment"	1954	—	—	—	—	—
"Little Shoemaker" b/w "Chiqui-Chaqui (Chick-ee Chock-ee)"	1954	—	—	—	—	—
"Jilted" (both sides with Frankie Vaughan) b/w "Do, Do, Do, Do, Do, Do, Do It Again"	1954	—	—	—	—	—
"Little Things Mean a Lot" b/w "Canoodlin' Rag"	1954	11	—	—	—	—
"Skinnie Minnie (Fish Tail)" b/w "What Am I Going to Do Ma (The Doo-Ma Song)"	1954	—	—	—	—	—
"This Ole House" b/w "Skokiaan"	1954	—	—	—	—	—
"I Can't Tell a Waltz from a Tango" b/w "Christmas Cards"	1954	6	—	—	—	—
"(Don't Let The) Kiddygeddin" b/w "Mrs. Santa Claus"	1954	—	—	—	—	—
"Paper Kisses" b/w "Softly, Softly"	1955	—	—	—	—	—
"Mambo Italiano" b/w "The Naughty Lady of Shady Lane"	1955	—	—	—	—	—
"Tweedlee-Dee" b/w "More Than Ever Now"	1955	—	—	—	—	—
"Tika Tika Tok" b/w "Chee-Chee-Oo-Chee (Sang the Little Bird)"	1955	—	—	—	—	—
"Dreamboat" b/w "(The Diddle-Ee-I) Irish Mambo"	1955	1	—	—	—	—
"Where Will the Dimple Be" b/w "Keep Me in Mind"	1955	—	—	—	—	—
"Got'n Idea" b/w "Give a Fool a Chance"	1955	—	—	—	—	—
"The Banjo's Back in Town" b/w "Go on By"	1955	17; 16	—	—	—	—
"Hernando's Hideaway" b/w "Blue Again"	1955	—	—	—	—	—
"Never Do a Tango with an Eskimo" b/w "Twenty Tiny Fingers"	1955	6; 17	—	—	—	—
"Love and Marriage" b/w "Sycamore Tree"	1956	—	—	—	—	—
"Willie Can" b/w "Lizzie Borden"	1956	13	—	—	—	—
"Don't Ring-A Da Bell" b/w "Bluebell"	1956	—	—	—	—	—
"No Other Love" (by Ronnie Hilton) b/w "It's All Been Done Before" (with Ronnie Hilton)	1956	—	—	—	—	—
"Why Do Fools Fall in Love" b/w "The Birds and the Bees"	1956	22; 25	—	—	—	—
"Mama Teach Me to Dance" b/w "I'm in Love Again"	1956	—	—	—	—	—
"In the Middle of the House" b/w "Two Innocent Hearts"	1956	20	—	—	—	—
"Pickin' a Chicken" (US-only release) b/w "Willie Can"	1956	—	—	—	—	—
"You, Me and Us" b/w "Three Brothers"	1957	18	—	—	—	—
"Whatever Lola Wants (Lola Gets)" b/w "Lucky Lips"	1957	26	—	—	—	—
"Chantez, Chantez" b/w "Funny, Funny, Funny"	1957	—	—	—	—	—
"Fabulous" b/w "Summer Love"	1957	—	—	—	—	—
"That's Happiness" b/w "What You've Done to Me"	1957	—	—	—	—	—
"Party Time" b/w "Please Mister Brown (Mister Jones, Mister Smith)"	1957	—	—	—	—	—
"The Story of My Life" b/w "Love Is"	1958	25	—	—	—	—
"Sugartime" b/w "Gettin' Ready for Freddy"	1958	16	—	—	—	—
"Stairway of Love" b/w "Comes Love"	1958	—	—	—	—	—
"Sorry, Sorry, Sorry" b/w "Fly Away Lovers"	1958	—	—	—	—	—
"There's Never Been a Night" b/w "If This Isn't Love"	1958	—	—	—	—	—
"Mama Says" b/w "Last Night on the Back Porch"	1959	— 27	—	—	—	—
"Pink Shoe Laces" b/w "The Universe"	1959	—	—	—	—	—
"We Got Love" b/w "I Don't Mind Being All Alone"	1959	26	—	—	—	—
"Dream Talk" b/w "O Dio Mio"	1960	48	—	—	—	—
"The Train of Love" b/w "The "I Love You" Bit" (with Oscar Nebbish, aka Lionel Bart)	1960	27	—	—	—	—
"Must Be Santa" b/w "Just Couldn't Resist Her With Her Pocket Transistor"	1960	—	—	—	—	—
"Cowboy Jimmy Joe" b/w "Don't Read the Letter"	1961	37	—	—	—	—
"With You in Mind" b/w "Ja-Da"	1961	—	—	—	—	—
"All Alone" b/w "Keep Me in Your Heart"	1961	—	97	—	—	—
"She's Got You" b/w "In the Shade of the Old Apple Tree"	1962	—	—	—	—	—
"Goodbye Joe" b/w "I Can't Give You Anything but Love"	1962	—	—	—	—	—
"Tell Him" b/w "Fly Me to the Moon"	1963	—	78	—	—	10
"Just Once More" b/w "Hold Your Hand Out You Naughty Boy"	1963	—	—	—	—	—
"Tennessee Waltz" b/w "I Love You Too Much"	1964	—	—	32	—	1
"Tennessee-Waltz" (German-language version) b/w "Mein schönster Traum (Que reste-t-il de nos amours)"	1964	—	—	—	10	—
"It's You" b/w "I Knew Right Away"	1964	—	—	—	—	—
"The Birds and the Bees" (Scandinavia-only release) b/w "Quando la luna"	1965	—	—	32	—	1
"Hill-Billy-Boy (Home on the Range)" (Germany-only release) b/w "Ich liebe die Sonne (We'll Sing in the Sunshine)"	1965	—	—	—	39	—
"Ba-Ba-Song (Whiffenpoof-Song)" (Germany-only release) b/w "Ruf mich an"	1965	—	—	—	—	—
"Snakes and Snails" b/w "How Many Nights, How Many Days"	1965	—	—	—	—	—
"So fängt es immer an (A Lovers Concerto)" (Germany-only release) b/w "Nun bist du mein Mann (Now That I Found You)"	1965	—	—	—	—	—
"Eight Days a Week" b/w "Help!"	1965	—	76	—	—	—
"Love Ya Illya" (under the name Angela and the Fans) b/w "I Know You"	1966	—	—	—	—	—
"Laß nicht soviel Zeit vergeh'n" (Germany-only release) b/w "An jedem Tag ist Zeit (There Is a Time and Place)"	1966	—	—	—	—	—
"Hello Baby" (Sweden-only release) b/w "There's a Time"	1966	—	—	—	—	—
"Now That I've Found You" b/w "More"	1966	—	—	—	—	—
"—" denotes releases that did not chart or were not released in that territory.
