= Over and Over Again (disambiguation) =

"Over and Over Again" is a 2015 song by Nathan Sykes.

"Over and Over Again" may also refer to:

- "Over and Over Again" (Robby Valentine song), 1991
- "Over and Over Again", a 1935 song by Richard Rodgers and Lorenz Hart, from the musical Jumbo
- "Over and Over Again", a 1953 song by Alma Cogan and Les Howard
- "Over and Over Again", a 1956 song by the Moonglows from the Rock, Rock, Rock soundtrack
- "Over and Over Again", a 1963 song by Buck Owens and the Buckaroos, released in 1963 as the B-side of "Act Naturally"
- "Over and Over Again", a 1968 song by Stranger Cole
- "Over and Over Again", a 1970 song by John Walker
- "Over and Over Again", a 1991 song by the Smithereens from Blow Up
- "Over and Over Again", a 2017 song by the Used from The Canyon
- "Over and Over Again (Lost and Found)", a 2005 song by Clap Your Hands Say Yeah from their album Clap Your Hands Say Yeah
- "(Over and) Over Again", a 2007 song by Morgana Lefay from Aberrations of the Mind
- "Over and Over (and Over Again)", a 2008 song by Hale from Above, Over and Beyond
- "Say It (Over and Over Again)", a 1963 song by John Coltrane Quartet on their 1963 album Ballads

== See also ==
- Over and Over (disambiguation)
- Over Again (disambiguation)
