= You, Me, and Us =

Song
- Released: 1959
- Recorded: 1957
- Genre: World music; Folk
- Length: 2:14
- Songwriter(s): Quirino Mendoza y Cortés; John Jerome

"You, Me, and Us" is a popular song published in 1956, with music based on the Mexican traditional folk song, "Cielito Lindo". The song is credited to John Jerome for both words and music, but undoubtedly only the lyrics were actually his creation.

A recording made by Alma Cogan was popular in 1957.
