= Ain't We Got Fun =

1921 popular foxtrot

- by Richard A. Whiting
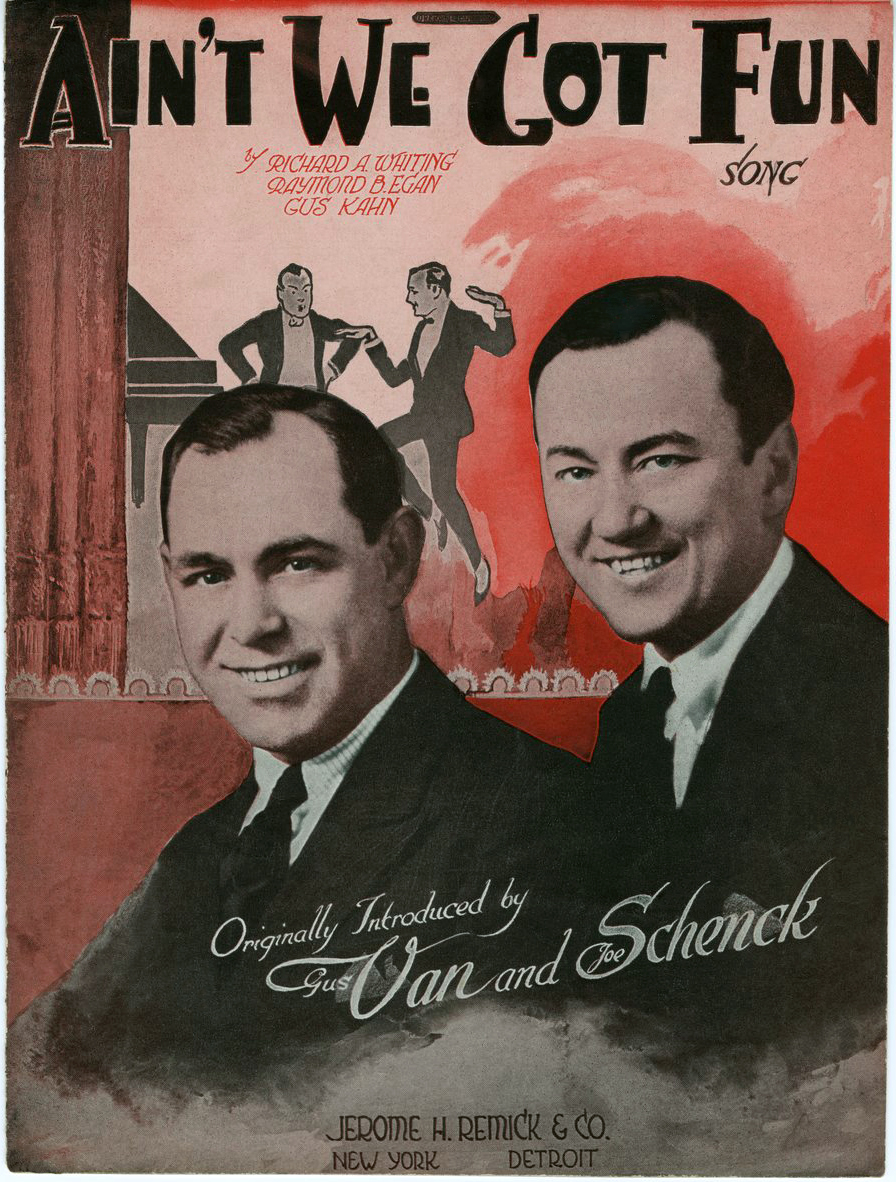
- Cover page to the sheet music
- Genre: Popular
- Form: Foxtrot
- Text: by Raymond B. Egan and Gus Kahn
- Melody: by Richard A. Whiting
- Performed: 1920
- Published: 1921
- Publisher: Jerome H. Remick & Co.
- Ain't We Got Fun? Recorded by Billy Jones in 1921 for Edison Records.

"Ain't We Got Fun" is a popular foxtrot published in 1921 with music by Richard A. Whiting, lyrics by Raymond B. Egan and Gus Kahn.

It was first performed in 1920 in the Fanchon and Marco revue Satires of 1920, then moved into vaudeville and recordings. "Ain't We Got Fun?" and its jaunty response to poverty and its promise of fun ("Every morning / Every evening," and "In the meantime, / In between time") have become symbolic of the Roaring Twenties, and it appears in some of the major literature of the decade, including The Great Gatsby by F. Scott Fitzgerald and in Dorothy Parker's award-winning short story of 1929, "Big Blonde." The song also contains variations on the phrase "The rich get richer and the poor get poorer" (substituting, e.g., "children" for "poorer"); though this phrase predates the song, its use increased with the song's popularity.

== Composition ==
"Ain't We Got Fun" follows the structure of a foxtrot. The melody uses mainly quarter notes, and has an unsyncopated refrain made up largely of variations on a repeated four-note phrase. The Tin Pan Alley Song Encyclopedia describes it as a "Roaring Twenties favourite" and praises its vibrancy, "zesty music," and comic lyrics.

Philip Furia, connecting Kahn's lyrics to the song's music, writes that:

Not only does Kahn use abrupt, colloquial—even ungrammatical—phrases, he abandons syntax for the telegraphic connections of conversation. Truncated phrases like not much money are the verbal equivalent of syncopated musical fragments.

Critical appraisals vary regarding what view of poverty the song's lyrics take. Nicholas E. Tawa summarizes the refrain "Ain't we got fun" as a "satirical and jaunty rejoinder" toward hard times. Diane Holloway and Bob Cheney, authors of American History in Song: Lyrics from 1900 to 1945, concur, and describe the black humor in the couple's relief that their poverty shields them from worrying about damage to their nonexistent Pierce Arrow luxury automobile.

Yet George Orwell highlights the lyrics of "Ain't We Got Fun" as an example of working class unrest:

All through the war and for a little time afterwards there had been high wages and abundant employment; things were now returning to something worse than normal, and naturally the working class resisted. The men who had fought had been lured into the army by gaudy promises, and they were coming home to a world where there were no jobs and not even any houses. Moreover, they had been at war and were coming home with a soldier's attitude to life, which is fundamentally, in spite of discipline, a lawless attitude. There was a turbulent feeling in the air.

After quoting a few of the song's lines Orwell refers to the era as a time when "people had not yet settled down to a lifetime of unemployment mitigated by endless cups of tea," a turn of phrase which the later writer Larry Portis contests.

He [Orwell] could just as easily have concluded that the song revealed a certain fatalism, a resignation and even capitulation to forces beyond the control of working people. Indeed, it might be only a small step from saying, "Ain't we got fun" in the midst of hardship to the idea that the poor are happier than the rich—because, as the Beatles intoned, "Money can't buy me love." It is possible that "Aint We Got Fun," a product of the music industry (as opposed to "working-class culture") was part of a complex resolution of crisis in capitalist society. Far from revealing the indomitable spirit of working people, it figured into the means with which they were controlled. It is a problem of interpretation laying at the heart of popular music, one which emerged with particular clarity at the time of the English Industrial Revolution.

However, others concentrate on the fun that they got. Stephen J. Whitfieldd, citing lyrics such as "Every morning / Every evening / Ain't we got fun," writes that the song "set the mood which is indelibly associated with the Roaring Twenties," a decade when pleasure was sought and found constantly, morning, evening, and "In the meantime / In between time." Philip Furia and Michael Lasser see implicit references to sexual intercourse in lyrics such as "the happy chappy, and his bride of only a year." Looked at in the context of the 1920s, an era of increasing sexual freedom, they point out that, while here presented within the context of marriage (in other songs it is not), the sexuality is notably closer to the surface than in previous eras and is presented as a delightful, youthful pleasure.

=== Variations ===
There are several variations on the lyrics. For example, American History in Song quotes the lyrics:

They won't smash up our Pierce Arrow,
We ain't got none
They've cut my wages
But my income tax will be so much smaller
When I'm paid off,
I'll be laid off
Ain't we got fun?

The sheet music published in 1921 by Jerome H. Remick leaves this chorus out completely, whereas a recording for Edison Records by Billy Jones keeps the reference to the Pierce Arrow automobile, but then continues as in the sheet music: "There's nothing surer / The rich get rich and the poor get laid off / In the meantime,/ In between time/ Ain't we got fun?"

In 2020, Seth MacFarlane and Elizabeth Gillies released a version with more satirical lyrics, including "The rich get rich and the poor get tear-gassed".

== Reception and performance history ==
It premièred in the Fanchon and Marco show Satires of 1920, where it was sung by Arthur West, then entered the vaudeville repertoire of Ruth Roye. A hit recording by Van and Schenck increased its popularity, and grew into a popular standard.

The song appears in the F. Scott Fitzgerald novel The Great Gatsby, when Daisy Buchanan and Gatsby meet again after many years, and the latter insists that Klipspringer, his apparently permanent "guest," play it for them. It also appears in Dorothy Parker's 1929 short story, "Big Blonde." Warner Brothers used the song in two musicals during the early 1950s: The Gus Kahn biopic I'll See You in My Dreams and The Eddie Cantor Story. Woody Allen used the song in his 1983 film Zelig.

== Notable recordings ==
- Van and Schenck (1921)
- Benson Orchestra of Chicago (1921)
- Billy Jones (1922)
- Margaret Whiting and Bob Hope (1949)
- Doris Day for her album By the Light of the Silvery Moon (1953)
- Gordon MacRae and June Hutton for the Capitol Records EP By the Light of the Silvery Moon (1953)
- Alma Cogan for her album I Love to Sing (1958)
- Peggy Lee for her album Jump for Joy (1958)
