= Face the Change =

1998 single by Every Little Thing

Single by Every Little Thing

from the album Time to Destination
- Released: January 7, 1998
- Genre: J-pop
- Length: 4:20
- Label: Avex Trax
- Songwriter: Mitsuru Igarashi

Every Little Thing singles chronology
"Shapes of Love/Never Stop!" (1997)	"Face the Change" (1998)	"Time Goes By" (1998)

"Face the Change" is a song by the J-pop group Every Little Thing, released as the group's seventh single on January 7, 1998. It was their second single to top the Oricon chart after the 1997 song "For the Moment".

== Composition ==
"Face the Change" is written in the key of G-sharp minor, has a tempo of 124 beats per minute, and the chorus follows a chord progression of E–F#–G♯m–E–F#–B–D#–E–F#–G♯m–E–F#–G♯m.

== Track listing ==
(According to Oricon)

1. Face the Change
2. Face the Change (Dub's Every Little Theme remix)
3. Face the Change (instrumental)

== Charts ==
=== Weekly charts ===
Weekly chart performance for "Face the Change"
Chart (1998)	Peak position
Japan (Oricon)	1
