= Carmen Costa =

Brazilian singer and composer

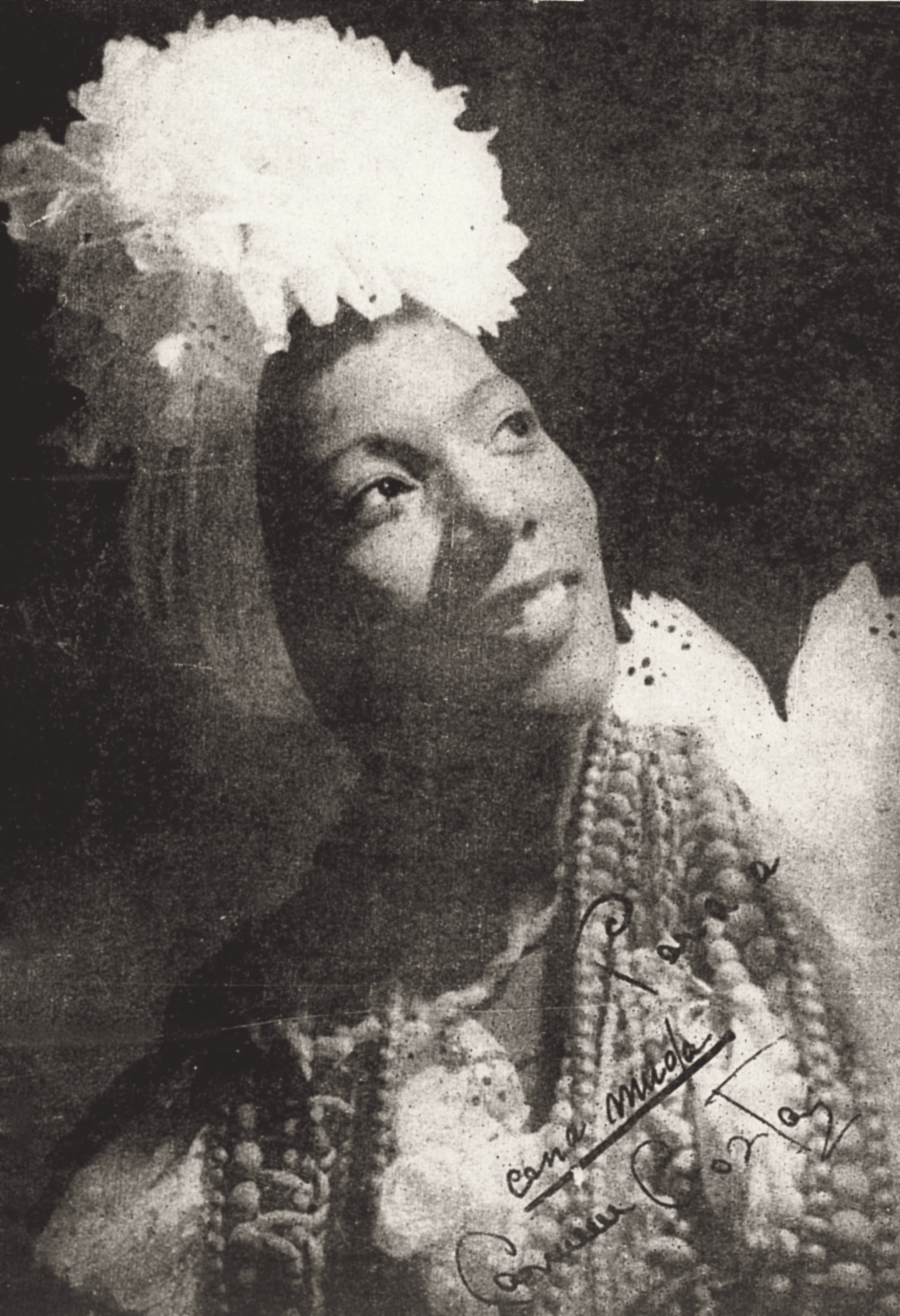

Background information
- Born: Carmelita Madriaga; 5 July 1920; Trajano de Moraes, RJ, Brazil
- Died: 25 April 2007 (aged 86) Rio de Janeiro, Brazil
- Genres: MPB
- Occupations: Singer, composer
- Years active: 1938–2007
- Labels: Odeon, Columbia, RCA Victor, Star, Discos Copacabana, Som Livre, EMI

Carmelita Madriaga, known as Carmen Costa, (5 July 1920 – 25 April 2007) was a Brazilian singer and composer.

== Biography ==
Born in Trajano de Moraes, in the state of Rio de Janeiro, Carmen Costa moved to the state capital at age 15, where she worked as a maid at the house of singer Francisco Alves. She started her musical career encouraged by Alves, inviting her to sing at parties and to participate in radio contests.

Carmen won the amateur singing radio contest presented by Ary Barroso. She became a professional singer, presenting herself in a duo with composer Henricão.

Her first hit was "Está Chegando a Hora", a version of Mexican song "Cielito Lindo", in the 1940s. In 1945, Costa married the American national Hans Van Koehler and moved with him to the United States. She spent a season in Los Angeles and, in 1962 sang at the Bossa Nova at Carnegie Hall concert, with Antonio Carlos Jobim, Stan Getz and João Gilberto, among others.

In 1950 she came back to Brazil, where she met composer Mirabeau Pinheiro, with whom she lived for five years and had her only daughter, Silésia. They worked together on songs like "Cachaça não é água" (being accused of plagiarism) and "Obsessão."

The singer also participated in several films, such as Pra Lá de Boa (1949), Carnaval em Marte (1955), Depois eu conto (1956) and Vou Te Contá (1958).

In 2003, the City Council of Rio de Janeiro had approved an initiative project of the Museum of the Republic and she was proclaimed Brazilian cultural heritage. For the occasion, she composed the song "Tombamento", which he sang for the Minister of Culture, Gilberto Gil .

On June 2, 2004, in Rio de Janeiro, she participated in the re-inauguration of Rádio Nacional, where she met former president Luiz Inácio Lula da Silva, together with the " Cantoras do Rádio " (Radio singers), a generation of artists revealed on Radio National. Emilinha Borba, Marlene, Ademilde Fonseca, Adelaide Chiozzo, and Carmélia Alves.

She died at Lourenço Jorge Hospital, in Rio de Janeiro, at age 86, after a few days in hospital. She had chronic kidney disease and cardiac arrest at 6:00 am on April 25, 2007.

== Tribute ==
On July 5, 2016, Google celebrated her 96th birthday with a Google Doodle.

== Discography ==
- Onde está o dinheiro?/Não dou motivo (1939) Odeon 78
- Dance mais um bocado/Não quero conselho (1940) Columbia 78
- Eu sambo meu nego/Não posso viver sem você (1941) Columbia 78
- Está chegando a hora/Só vendo que beleza (1942) Odeon 78
- Depois que ela partiu(Com Henricão)/Formosa morena (1942) Odeon 78
- Carmilito/Festa na roça (1942) Victor 78
- Caramba/A festa é boa (1943) Victor 78
- A coisa melhorou/Já é de madrugada (1943) Victor 78
- Estrela D'Alva (1943) Victor 78
- Quero ver-te uma vez mais/Velho realejo (1943) Victor 78
- Chorei de dor/Não me abandone (1944) Victor 78
- Madalena/Não há (1944) Victor 78
- Chamego/Casinha da Marambaia (1944) Victor 78
- Garota esportiva/A mulher do Lino (1944) Victor 78
- Outro céu/Manduca (1944) Victor 78
- Sarapaté/Ciúme (1945) Victor 78
- E não tarda a amanhecer/Bilu-bilu (1945) Victor 78
- No lesco lesco/Não posso aceitar (1945) Victor 78
- Siga seu destino/Meu barraco (1946) Victor 78
- Sonhei que estava em Pernambuco (1949) Star 78
- Dona Juliana/Chiquinha (1949) Star 78
- Se é pecado eu não sei/Cetim para as baianas (1951) Star 78
- Busto calado/Coco duro (1952) Star 78
- Tô te esperando/Quando chega a noite (1952) Star 78
- Não me deixe/Tô te esperando (1952) Star 78
- Cachaça (Com Colé) (1952) Copacabana 78
- Defesa/Resposta (1953) Copacabana 78.
- Maria Pé de Boi/Batendo pé (1953) Copacabana 78
- Eu sou a outra/Não pode mexer (1953) Copacabana 78
- Tranca rua/Mais tempero (1954) Copacabana 78
- Tio biruta/Mexerica (1954) Copacabana 78
- Canção da alma/Quase (1954) Copacabana 78
- Não é só vestir saia/Manchetes de jornal (1954) Copacabana 78
- Busto calado/Coco duro (1954) Copacabana 78
- Sacode a lapela/Operário (1955) Copacabana 78
- Tem nego bebo aí/Até amanhã (1955) Copacabana 78
- Gente cega/Reencontro (1955) Copacabana 78
- Presidiário/Se você me quer bem (1955) Copacabana 78
- Sei de tudo/Obsessão (1955) Copacabana 78
- Começo de vida/A morena sou eu (1955) Copacabana 78
- Drama da favela/Acacamauê (1956) Copacabana 78
- Na paz de Deus/Deixa o cabrito berrar (1956) Copacabana 78
- Amor barato/Se eu fosse contar (1956) Copacabana 78
- Don Charles/Só você (1956) Copacabana 78
- Jarro da saudade/Está bem (1956) Copacabana 78
- Gato escaldado/Nem só de pão (1957) Copacabana 78
- Jarro da saudade (1957) Copacabana 78
- Facundo/Drama de amor (1957) Copacabana 78
- Cai sereno/Palácio improvisado (1957) Copacabana 78
- Carmen Costa nº 2 (1957) Copacabana LP
- Indecisão/Como eu chorei (1958) Copacabana 78
- Lágrimas de sangue/Augusto Calheiros (1958) RCA Victor 78
- Aquela noite/Está chegando a hora (1959) RCA Victor 78
- Se eu morrer amanhã/Cretcheu (Amor) (1961) RCA Victor 78
- Marcha do cordão da Bola Preta/Se eu morrer amanhã (1961) RCA Victor 78
- Eu sou a outra/Quase (1963) Copacabana 78
- Ensinando a bossa nova/Melancolia (1963) Copacabana 78
- O samba no Brasil/Tem bobo pra tudo (1963) RCA Victor 78
- Não fique triste/Mal que faz bem (1964) Copacabana 78
- Embaixatriz do samba (1964) Copacabana LP
- Ziriguidum no Sambão (1971) RCA Candem LP
- Trinta anos depois (1973) RCA Victor LP
- A Música de Paulo Vanzolini - Carmen Costa e Paulo Marques (1974) Discos Marcus Pereira LP
- Carmen Costa (1980) Continental LP
- Agnaldo Timóteo & Carmen Costa - Na Galeria do amor (1981) EMI/Odeon LP
- Benditos, Hinos e Ladainhas (1983) Alvorada/Continental LP
- Tantos caminhos (1996) Som Livre CD
- Bis Cantores do Rádio - Carmen Costa (2000) EMI CD
