= The Remixes II =

Remix album by Every Little Thing
- Released: November 18, 1998
- Genres: J-pop; house
- Length: 74:16
- Labels: Avex Trax (CD); Rhythm Republic (Vinyl set)
- Producer: Max Matsuura

Every Little Thing chronology
| Time to Destination (1998) | The Remixes II (1998) | Every Best Single +3 (1999) |

The Remixes II is the second remix album by Japanese duo Every Little Thing. It was released on November 18, 1998, by Avex Trax. The album contains remixes of tracks from second album Time to Destination.

A 4-vinyl edition of the album was released on June 16, 1999, including previously unreleased remixes that didn't make it to the original CD track listing.

== Track listing ==
| No. | Title | Remixer(s) | Length |
|---|---|---|---|
| 1. | "Face the Change" (Eboman's Remix) | Eboman | 5:45 |
| 2. | "Shapes of Love" (Deejay Punk-Roc Remix) | Deejay Punk-Roc | 5:50 |
| 3. | "Ima demo... Anata ga Suki Dakara" (Tuff Jam's Classic Garage Remix) | Tuff Jam | 6:56 |
| 4. | "Deatta Koro no Yō ni" (Hybrid Remix) | Hybrid | 6:04 |
| 5. | "Hometown" (Toon's R&B Remix) | Rod Antoon | 4:36 |
| 6. | "Monochrome" (Dom+Roland Remix) | Dom+Roland | 5:30 |
| 7. | "Time Goes By" (Hybrid Remix) | Hybrid | 7:24 |
| 8. | "For the moment" (Satoshi's Burst Mix) | Satoshi Hidaka | 4:54 |
| 9. | "True Colors" (Fake Colors Treatment Take 1) | Maki Fujii | 3:30 |
| 10. | "Shapes of Love" (D-Z Bleeding Messiah Mix Ver. 2) | D-Z | 5:31 |
| 11. | "Ima demo... Anata ga Suki Dakara" (HΛL's Go Insane Mix) | HΛL | 4:54 |
| 12. | "Deatta Koro no Yō ni" (Nao's Atomic Mix) | Nao Nakamura; Honzawa | 6:21 |
| 13. | "All Along" (Dub's Double-Speed Remix) | Dub Master X | 7:01 |
| Total length: | | | 74:16 |

The Remixes II Analog Set

Disc 1 - Side A
| No. | Title | Remixer(s) | Length |
|---|---|---|---|
| 1. | "For the Moment" (Main Mix) | Prophets Of Sound |
| 2. | "For the Moment" (Satoshi's Burst Mix) | Satoshi Hidaka |

Disc 1 - Side B
| No. | Title | Remixer(s) | Length |
|---|---|---|---|
| 1. | "Ima demo... Anata ga Suki Dakara" (Tuff Jam's Classic Garage Remix) | Tuff Jam |
| 2. | "Ima demo... Anata ga Suki Dakara" (HΛL's Go Insane Mix) | HΛL |
| 3. | "Hometown" (Toon's R&B Remix) | Rod Antoon | 4:58 |
| 4. | "Hometown" (H. Hakamada Wicked Mix) | Hideki Hakadama |

Disc 2 - Side A
| No. | Title | Remixer(s) | Length |
|---|---|---|---|
| 1. | "Face the Change" (Final Version) | Eboman |
| 2. | "Face the Change" (Kitto Mix) | Motsu |
| 3. | "Face the Change" (B.U.S Remix) | B.U.S (Build Up Swing) |

Disc 2 - Side B
| No. | Title | Remixer(s) | Length |
|---|---|---|---|
| 1. | "Monochrome" (Vocal Mix) | Dom+Roland |
| 2. | "Monochrome" (H II H Remix) | H II H |
| 3. | "True Colors" (Fake Colors Treatment Take 1) | Maki Fujii |
| 4. | "True Colors" (Take 1) | Shige |

Disc 3 - Side A
| No. | Title | Remixer(s) | Length |
|---|---|---|---|
| 1. | "All Along" (Main Mix) | Prophets of Sound |
| 2. | "All Along" (Dub's Double Speed Remix) | Dub Master X |

Disc 3 - Side B
| No. | Title | Remixer(s) | Length |
|---|---|---|---|
| 1. | "Deatta Koro no Yō ni" (Hybrid Remix) | Hybrid |
| 2. | "Deatta Koro no Yō ni" (Nao's Atomic Mix Take 1) | Nao Nakamura; Honzawa |
| 3. | "Deatta Koro no Yō ni" (Orienta-Rhythm Hard Club Mix) | Orienta-Rhythm |

Disc 4 - Side A
| No. | Title | Remixer(s) | Length |
|---|---|---|---|
| 1. | "Shapes of Love" (Deejay Punk-Roc Remix) | Deejay Punk-Roc |
| 2. | "Shapes of Love" (D-Z Bleeding Messiah Mix Version 2) | D-Z |

Disc 4 - Side B
| No. | Title | Remixer(s) | Length |
|---|---|---|---|
| 1. | "Time Goes By" (Hybrid Remix) | Hybrid |
| 2. | "Time Goes By" (Lover's Chemistry Mix) | M-Flo |

== Charts ==
| Chart (2002) | Peak position |
|---|---|
| Japan Oricon | 5 |
