= Isn't Life Wonderful (disambiguation) =

Isn't Life Wonderful may refer to:

- "Isn't Life Wonderful?" (story), a 1924 short story by Geoffrey Moss appearing in his anthology Defeat (book)
- Isn't Life Wonderful (film), a 1924 U.S. romance film directed by D.W. Griffith, based on the eponymous Geoffrey Moss story "Isn't Life Wonderful?"
- Isn't Life Wonderful! (film), a 1953 UK period comedy film also released as Uncle Willie's Bicycle Shop
- "Isn't Life Wonderful" (song), a 1953 song by UK singer Alma Cogan off the record single "Over and Over Again"; see Alma Cogan discography

== See also ==
- Life is Wonderful (disambiguation)
- It's a Wonderful Life (disambiguation)
- A Wonderful Life (disambiguation)
- Wonderful Life (disambiguation)
