= Smile Again =

Smile Again may refer to:

- Smile Again (2006 TV series)
- Smile Again (2010 TV series)
- "Smile Again", a song by Blackbear from Everything Means Nothing
- "Smile Again", a song by Neoton Família
- "Smile Again", a song by Usher from the album Usher
- "Smile Again", a song by 9nine
- "Rescue Me/Smile Again", a song by Every Little Thing
