= Lee Carlson =

American writer

- Born: February 21, 1958 (age 68); San Diego, California, United States
- Education: Skidmore College
- Occupations: Writer; freelance writer; memoirist
- Writing career
- Genres: Memoir, poetry, essay, short story
- Notable work: Passage to Nirvana
- Website: charlescarlson.life#discover-what-matters

Lee Carlson (born February 21, 1958) is an American writer best known for his memoir, Passage to Nirvana, about surviving traumatic brain injury. Prior to publishing Passage to Nirvana he was a magazine and newspaper journalist specializing in writing about outdoor adventure sports such as skiing and scuba diving. He was senior travel editor for Skiing magazine, and has worked for media outlets such as Outside magazine, Newsday, NBC Sports, ESPN and many others.

== Background ==
Carlson grew up in Buffalo, New York, where he attended the Nichols School. According to his memoir, he had an upper middle class upbringing, and was an athletic child, participating in sports that included skiing, sailing, lacrosse, and others, which led to his career as an outdoor travel/sportswriter.

He attended Skidmore College, where he was a student of Clark Blaise, the writing teacher and short-story writer who was Bernard Malamud's main pupil, and also roommates and good friends with Raymond Carver at the Iowa Writers' Workshop at the University of Iowa. Blaise was the director of the International Writing Program there. Carlson was a painting major and heavily involved in theater at Skidmore, but credits Blaise with his becoming a professional writer. His other major influence and mentor is Peter Matthiessen, with whom Carlson has studied for many years as a Zen Buddhism student.

After college, Carlson worked briefly as a private yacht captain, and then moved to New York to pursue his writing career. He held a number of writer/editor positions at small trade magazines, including editor-in-chief of a low-temperature physics magazine. Eventually he secured a job covering two of his main interests, skiing and travel, when he became senior travel editor at Skiing magazine.

In 2002, several months after working for NBC at the 2002 Winter Olympics in Salt Lake City, Carlson was hit by a car and suffered a traumatic brain injury, leading to a year of full-time rehab and several years of recovery. After the accident, Carlson, being a lifelong sailor, decided to once again pursue one of his loves and work as a private yacht captain. He then, with his fiancée Meg, purchased and rebuilt a 25-year-old, 60-foot sailboat they renamed "Nirvana". The accident, aftermath and boat form the metaphorical journey to recovery detailed in his book.

Carlson lives in Greenport, New York, aboard "Nirvana". Carlson holds a 100-ton US Coast Guard captain's license
