= With You in Mind =

"With You in Mind" can refer to:

- With You in Mind (Marianne Faithfull song), a 1966 song by Marianne Faithfull
- With You in Mind (Allen Toussaint song), a song by Allen Toussaint included in his 1978 album Motion, popularized by Aaron Neville
- With You in Mind (album), a 1962 album by Alma Cogan
  - With You in Mind (Alma Cogan song), a song from the album
