= Good God! =

2022 Rio Romeo Extended Play

EP by Rio Romeo
- Released: September 23, 2022
- Genres: Indie pop; bedroom pop; folk pop
- Length: 14:52
- Label: Frtyfve Records
- Producer: Rio Romeo

Rio Romeo chronology
Good God! (2022)	Over & Over (2023)

Singles from Good God!
- 1. "Bet" Released: February 14, 2022; 2. "Nothing's New" Released: September 23, 2022

Good God! is the second extended play by American singer and songwriter Rio Romeo through Frtyfve Records on October 7, 2022. The EP was featured of indie pop, bedroom pop, and folk pop, and includes the song "Nothing's New", which gained popularity on Tiktok, being 22nd on Tiktok billboard.

Romeo described when they were publishing the album that "They were very embarrassed because it was so vulnerable".

== Background ==
Rio Romeo is an American singer and songwriter. They began releasing music through AWAL in 2018. In 2020, Their audience grew significantly as their music circulated on TikTok.

Good God! is produced by Rio Romeo and Mike Irish. The album was released on September 23, 2022 through Frtyfve Records.

== Track listing ==
All tracks are written by Rio Romeo.

Good God! track listing
No.	Title	Length
1.	"Inarticulation"	2:47
2.	"Bet"	2:39
3.	"Absence"	2:56
4.	"Nothing's New"	3:31
5.	"Twice"	3:19
Total length:		14:52

== Personnel ==
Credits adapted from liner notes.

- Rio Romeo – vocals, lyrics, instruments, production
- Mike Irish – production, mixing
