= All I Do Is Dream of You =

1934 popular song

Song
- Published: 1934 by Robbins
- Composer: Nacio Herb Brown
- Lyricist: Arthur Freed

"All I Do Is Dream of You" is a popular song with the music written by Nacio Herb Brown and the lyrics by Arthur Freed. Published in 1934, the song was originally written for the Joan Crawford film Sadie McKee (1934) when it was played during the opening credits and later sung by Gene Raymond three times. It was also sung in the film by Earl Oxford in a show. The song is featured in the films Singin' in the Rain, A Night at the Opera, The Affairs of Dobie Gillis, and Crimes and Misdemeanors.

The first recording of the song was on April 23, 1934, by Dick Robertson and Angelo Ferdinando's Hotel Great Northern Orchestra. It has since been recorded many times. Early hit versions included those by Jan Garber, Freddy Martin, and Henry Busse. Garber's version charted #1 in 1934 and remained on the charts for 14 weeks.

== Recorded versions ==
- Dick Robertson with Angelo Ferdinando's Orchestra, recorded on April 23, 1934, for Bluebird Records (catalog No. 5458A)
- Fritz Heilborn with Jan Garber Orchestra (May 8, 1934)
- Jimmie Lunceford – featuring Sy Oliver (1934)
- Al Bowlly with Ray Noble and his orchestra, recorded July 11, 1934. (Al Bowlly Discography)
- Chico Marx – piano version in the film A Night at the Opera (1935)
- Judy Garland (1940)
- Dinah Shore with Glenn Miller
- Patti Page (1949)
- Debbie Reynolds in Singin' in the Rain (1952)
- Debbie Reynolds, Bobby Van in The Affairs of Dobie Gillis (1953)
- Johnnie Ray – a single release in 1953
- Jerry Vale – included in the album Girl Meets Boy (1954)
- The Hi-Lo's – for their album On Hand (1956)
- Pat Boone – in his album Howdy! (1956)
- Jaye P. Morgan – for her album Just You, Just Me (1958)
- Patience and Prudence (1958)
- Bing Crosby included the song in a medley on his album Join Bing and Sing Along (1959)
- Dean Martin – for his album Sleep Warm (1959)
- Louis Prima and Keely Smith - for the album Louis and Keely! (1959)
- Doris Day – for her album I Have Dreamed (1961)
- Perry Como – for his album Sing to Me Mr. C 1961)
- Alma Cogan for her album, With You in Mind (1961)
- Cliff Richard (1961)
- Robert Goulet – for his album The Wonderful World of Love (1962).
- Sarah Vaughan – for her album Sarah + 2 (1962)
- Enoch Light (1964)
- Ella Fitzgerald (1968), 30 By Ella, Columbia Records
- Bennie Green (re-issue on Mosaic)
- Twiggy (1971, in the film The Boy Friend)
- Charly García (1982), Pubis Angelical-Yendo De La Cama Al Living (Under the Title of "All I Do the Whole Night Through")
- The McGuire Sisters – The Anthology (1999)
- Leon Redbone – included in his album Any Time (2001).
- Stacey Kent – The Boy Next Door (2003)
- Michael Bublé – Crazy Love (2009)
- Emilie-Claire Barlow – Haven't We Met? (2009)
- Emmy Rossum – Sentimental Journey (2013)
- Richard Chamberlain – Richard Chamberlain Sings (1962)
- Faultline feat. dodie (2018)
