= It's a Wonderful Life (disambiguation) =

It's a Wonderful Life is a 1946 Frank Capra film starring James Stewart.

It's a Wonderful Life may also refer to:

== Stage and screen ==
=== Film ===
- It's a Wonderful Life (1994 film), a Hong Kong film starring Leslie Cheung
- It's a Wonderful Life (2007 film), a Hong Kong film directed by Ronald Cheng
- Franz Kafka's It's a Wonderful Life, a 1995 short film

=== Theatre ===
- It's a Wonderful Life (opera), Heggie
- It's a Wonderful Life: A Live Radio Play, a stage play adapted by Joe Landry based on the 1946 film

=== Television ===
- "It's a Wonderful Life", an episode of That '70s Show
- It's a Wonderful Life (TV series), 2013 Singaporean Chinese-language TV series
- "It's a Wonderful Life", an episode of Donkey Kong Country

== Music ==
=== Albums ===
- It's a Wonderful Life (album), a 2001 album by Sparklehorse
- It's a Wonderful Life (EP), a 1987 EP by Fishbone

=== Songs ===
- "It's a Wonderful Life" (song), a 2001 song by Sparklehorse, the title track off the eponymous album It's a Wonderful Life (album)
- "It's a Wonderful Life (Gonna Have a Good Time)", a 1987 song by Fishbone, the title track off the eponymous EP It's a Wonderful Life (EP)

== Other uses ==
- Tomoyo After: It's a Wonderful Life, a Japanese visual novel

== See also ==
- It Was a Wonderful Life, a 1993 documentary film
- It's a Wonderful Afterlife, a 2010 Indian/British film
- A Wonderful Life (disambiguation)
- Wonderful Life (disambiguation)
- Life is Wonderful (disambiguation)
- Isn't Life Wonderful (disambiguation)
- It's a Wonderful Lie (disambiguation)
- It's a Beautiful Life (disambiguation)
