= Over and Over =

Over and Over may refer to:

== Albums ==
- Over and Over (The 88 album), 2005
- Over and Over (Erin Bode album) or the title song, 2006
- Over and Over (Boom Boom Satellites album), 2010
- Over and Over (EP), by Kim Ji-yeon, 2019
- Over and Over, by Nana Mouskouri, 1969

== Songs ==
- "Over and Over" (Bobby Day song), 1958; covered by the Dave Clark Five, 1965
- "Over & Over" (Captain Hollywood Project song), 1996
- "Over and Over" (Every Little Thing song), 1999
- "Over & Over" (Fleetwood Mac song), 1979
- "Over and Over" (Hot Chip song), 2006
- "Over and Over" (Madeline Merlo song), 2017
- "Over and Over" (Nelly song), featuring Tim McGraw, 2004
- "Over and Over" (Puff Johnson song), 1996
- "Over and Over", by Beach House from Once Twice Melody, 2022
- "Over and Over", by Black Sabbath from Mob Rules, 1981
- "Over and Over", by the Goo Goo Dolls from Boxes, 2016
- "Over and Over", by Joe Walsh from But Seriously, Folks..., 1978
- "Over and Over", by Joey Albert, 1984
- "Over and Over", by Madonna from Like a Virgin, 1984
- "Over and Over", by MC5 from High Time, 1971
- "Over & Over", by Moloko from Statues, 2003
- "Over and Over", by Morcheeba from Big Calm, 1998
- "Over and Over", by Neck Deep from Rain in July, 2012
- "Over and Over", by Neil Young and Crazy Horse from Ragged Glory, 1990
- "Over and Over", by P1Harmony from Duh!, 2025
- "Over and Over", by Pajama Party from Up All Night, 1989
- "Over and Over", by Ryan Adams from 1984, 2014
- "Over and Over", by Shalamar from The Look, 1983
- "Over and Over", by Sylvester from Sylvester, 1977
- "Over and Over", by Three Days Grace from One-X, 2006
- "Over and Over", by Timmy T from Time After Time, 1990
- "Over and Over", by Wilson Phillips from Wilson Phillips, 1990

== Other ==
- All About Us (musical) (original title: Over and Over), a 1999 musical

== See also ==
- Over and Over Again (disambiguation)
- "Over and Over and Over", a song by Jack White from Boarding House Reach
- "Over + Over + Over + Over", a song by Cardiacs from Toy World
