= Cielito Lindo =

Mexican folk song by Quirino Mendoza y Cortés

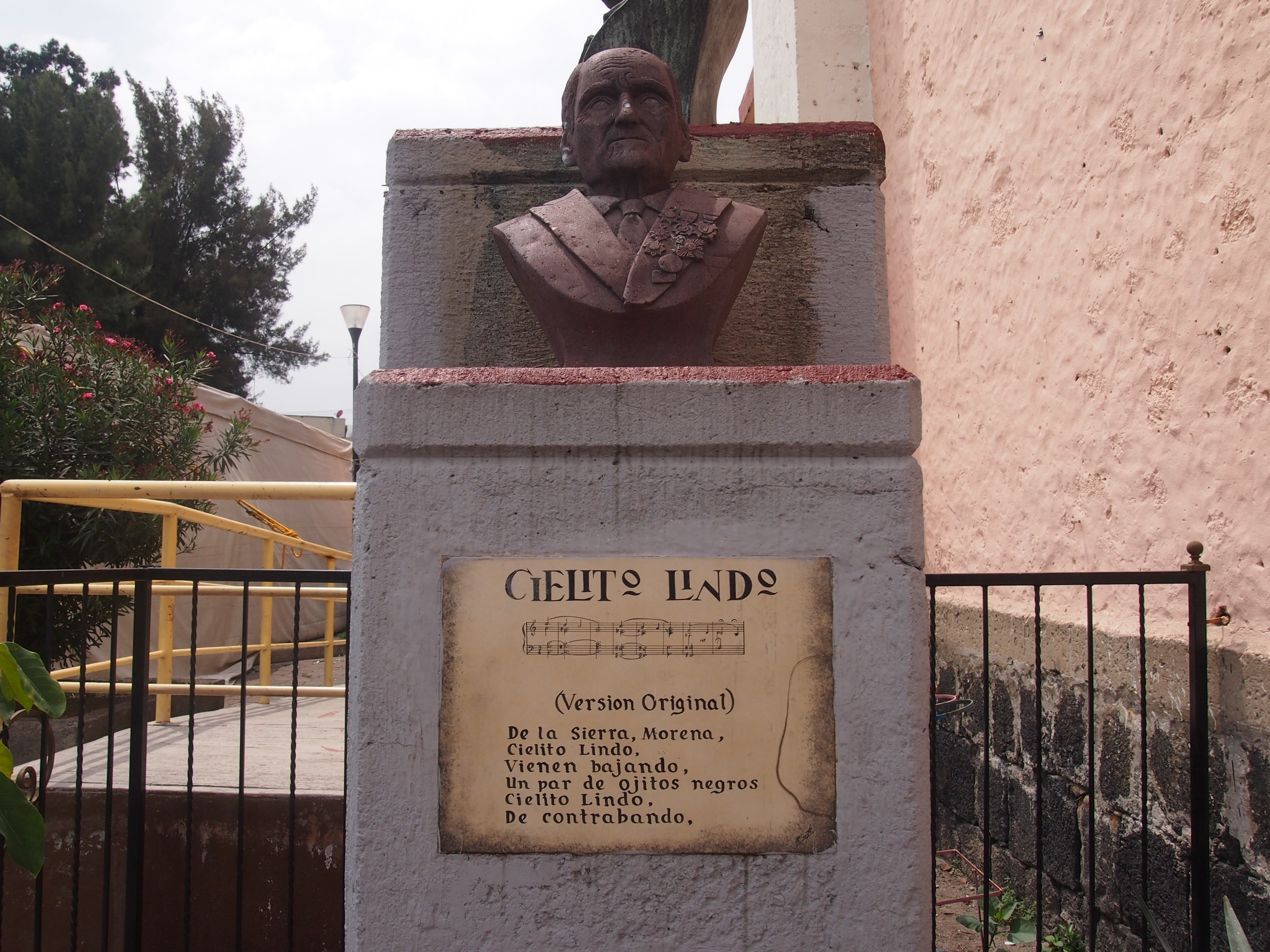
Bust of composer Quirino Mendoza y Cortés with a plaque showing measures of the song and lyrics

"Cielito Lindo" (roughly translated as "Lovely Sweet One") (Note: Although the word cielo means "sky" or "heaven", it is also a term of endearment comparable to "sweetheart" or "honey". Cielito, the diminutive, can be translated as "sweetie"; lindo means "cute", "lovely" or "pretty".) is a Mexican folk song or copla popularized in 1882 by Mexican author Quirino Mendoza y Cortés (c. 1862 – 1957). The song is commonly known by words from the refrain, "Canta y no llores", or simply as the "Ay, Ay, Ay, Ay song".

Commonly played by mariachi bands, it has been recorded by many artists in the original Spanish as well as in English and other languages, including by Tito Guizar, Pedro Infante, Vicente Fernandez, Placido Domingo, Luciano Pavarotti, Eartha Kitt, The Wiggles, Menudo and Ana Gabriel. It also featured prominently in the iconic Mexican film Los tres Garcia. There is some debate as to whether the song's lyrics refer to the Sierra Morena, a mountain range in southern Spain, or the similarly named Sierra de Morones, in the Mexican state of Zacatecas. However most Mexicans believe that this is a misrepresentation of the lyrics and is intended as "la Sierra, Morena", "Morena" is a common term of endearment, and with the comma, it now means he is directly speaking to the woman in the song instead of a specific place. It has become a famous song of Mexico, especially in Mexican expatriate communities around the world or for Mexicans attending international events such as the Olympic Games or the FIFA World Cup.

== Lyrics ==
The song's lyrical scheme corresponds to the Castilian classical stanza known as the seguidilla, i.e. seven lines of alternating heptasyllabic and pentasyllabic verses. Lyrics vary widely from performer to performer, and every singer is free to add and remove some verses for his or her own interpretation. Some of the most traditional lyrics are the following:

Lyrics	Literal English translation	Idiomatic translation
De la sierra, morena, Cielito lindo, vienen bajando Un par de ojitos negros, Cielito lindo, de contrabando. Estribillo: Ay, ay, ay, ay, Canta y no llores, Porque cantando se alegran, Cielito lindo, los corazones. Pájaro que abandona, Cielito lindo, su primer nido, Si lo encuentra ocupado, Cielito lindo, bien merecido. (Estribillo) Ese lunar que tienes, Cielito lindo, junto a la boca, No se lo des a nadie, Cielito lindo, que a mí me toca. (Estribillo) Una flecha en el aire, Cielito lindo, lanzó Cupido. Si la tiró jugando, Cielito lindo, a mí me ha herido. (Estribillo)	From the mountains, dark-haired girl, Pretty little heaven, come down A pair of little black eyes, Pretty little heaven, sneaking by. Refrain: Woe, woe, woe, woe, Sing and don't cry, Because singing rejoices, Pretty little heaven, our hearts. A bird that abandons, Pretty little heaven, its first nest, If he finds it occupied, Pretty little heaven, (it is) well deserved. (Refrain) That beauty mark that you have, Pretty little heaven, beside your mouth, Do not give it to anyone, Pretty little heaven, for it's my turn. (Refrain) An arrow in the air Pretty little heaven, Cupid shot. If he threw it playing, Pretty little heaven, he injured me. (Refrain)	From the mountains, dark-haired girl, Darling, come down A pair of lovely black eyes; Darling, they are sneaking past. Refrain: Woe, woe, woe, woe, Sing and don’t cry, Because singing, darling, Lifts our hearts. A bird that abandons, Darling, its first nest, If he finds it occupied, Darling, it is well deserved. (Refrain) That beauty mark that you have Darling, next to your mouth, Don’t share it with anyone, Darling, because it belongs to me. (Refrain) An arrow in the air, Darling, Cupid has flung. Even if he shot it in jest, Darling, he has smitten me. (Refrain)

In the article "¡Hasta que me cayó el veinte!", Ortega discusses the origins of the first verse of this song. His research discovered that in the early 17th century, armed bandits would take refuge in the Sierra Morena mountains of Spain and that people feared for their lives when they had to travel through the region. The words of the first verse of "Cielito Lindo" were found in a song from that era, hinting at that fear. But with time the meaning of the verse changed as people began romanticizing it. "Your face is the Sierra Morena. Your eyes are thieves who live there." The verse had other melodies put to it and variations on the lyrics. Quirino Mendoza, the composer, adapted the verse to his own melody and gave us the song we know today.

== Versions ==
The song has been subject to many versions:

- A recording dated 26 November 1926 from Mexican Tipica Orchestra, matrix 20384A, Victor
- Carl Sandburg included "Cielito Lindo" with Spanish lyrics and a piano arrangement (by Alfred G. Wathall) in his 1927 The American Songbag (page 298) in a chapter called "Mexican Border Songs".
- Anthony Mann 1945 noir thriller The Great Flamarion starring Erich von Stroheim, Mary Beth Hughes, and Dan Duryea opens with a Mexican vaudeville performance of "Cielito Lindo".
- In 1954 Rodolfo Biagi recorded a tango instrumental version of the song.
- "Heavenly Night" is an English version, with the melody adapted by Sebastian Yradier and Neil Wilson. Bing Crosby recorded it for his album El Señor Bing and many other singers.
- Alma Cogan's 1957 hit "You, Me, and Us" used the tune from "Cielito Lindo", with English lyrics.
- Ska punk band Voodoo Glow Skulls recorded the song on their album Éxitos al Cabrón in 1999.
- Pedro Infante sang it in the 1947 Mexican film Los tres García. He also had the lead role in the film.
- In 1942, Brazilian singer Carmen Costa released a famous version of the song in Portuguese called "Está Chegando a Hora" (The time is coming).
- In 1963, Trini Lopez released a very famous Spanish version of the song, on his album Trini Lopez at PJ's.
- In the 1965 cartoon Cats and Bruises, Speedy Gonzales sings the song twice for a female mouse while being pursued by Sylvester the Cat.
- In 1982, popular Puerto Rican boy band Menudo covered this song for performances in Mexico, only. It was finally released in 1983, but only on the album Adiós Miguel.
- In 1989, José Feliciano on his album I'm Never Gonna Change. His version won the Grammy Award for Best Latin Pop Performance.
- In 1993 the song was sung by Fabrizio De André as opening of an Italian program named after the song. This recording was published in the album Effedia: Sulla mia cattiva strada.
- The Three Tenors have performed the song at many of their concerts.
- Other Spanish versions include those by Irma Vila y su Mariachi, and Los Lobos, alongside Luciano Pavarotti and José Carreras. In 2006 it was recorded by Ana Gabriel.
- There are instrumental versions as well, notably by Mantovani.
- Cuban rumba band leader and actor Desi Arnaz performed the song's refrain several times on the popular American television show I Love Lucy, in which he co-starred alongside his wife, Lucille Ball.
- In the season four episode of I Love Lucy "Ricky's Movie Offer" (1954), Mrs. Trumbull (Elizabeth Patterson) sings the song in the episode's final scene.
- The song "Richard Allen George...No, It's Just Cheez" by Less Than Jake ends with a sing-along about mustaches, to the melody of "Cielito Lindo".
- Iranian singer Mohsen Namjoo included it in his third album Oy. His version features Golshifteh Farahani as co-singer. Within the song, he included some poems by Shamloo and Rumi.
- Limerick songs are often set to the tune of "Cielito Lindo".
- Deanna Durbin, a Canadian-American singer and actress from the 1930s and 1940s, recorded a version of the song in Spanish.
- A 4/4 adaptation was used in the finale of Shostakovich's 6th Symphony
- An ad for Fritos featured the Frito Bandito character singing a version of the song with different lyrics. Many Mexican nationals considered this a racist insult to their culture.
- Agent 99 (Barbara Feldon) sings José Moriche's 1925 version of the song in the 1969 Get Smart episode "Tequila Mockingbird".
- UK 1970's football terrace chant: "Ai ai ai ai, 《insert team name here》are rubbish".
- In an episode of the popular children's series Shining Time Station, the song was covered by the Jukebox Band, led by Tito Swing (voiced by Jonathan Freeman).
- In Season 1, Episode 12 of The Big Bang Theory (2008), Sheldon Cooper sings the lyrics to Hava Nagila to the tune of Cielito Lindo as he combines these two distinct songs.
- A version by Mariachi Bandido is featured in Destin Daniel Cretton's 2013 movie Short Term 12.
- On December 31, 2014, Jeff Rosenstock, former frontman of the New York punk band Bomb The Music Industry!, released two recordings of "Cielito Lindo", a fast version and a slow version.
- The melody of the song was used in Nazi-occupied Poland in a popular street chant "Teraz jest wojna" ("Now there is war") sung by street musicians and resistance movement.
- The interpretation of Ibrahim Ferrer's composition titled "De Camino a la Vereda" found on the album Buena Vista Social Club includes an allusion to the song.
- The song was played in the "Mariachi Madness" Detour from the premiere of The Amazing Race 28, where teams had to find which band member was faking their performance during the song. A similar task and performance also appeared on the ninth episode of The Amazing Race China 3.
- The song appears as a lullaby in Season 2 Episode 13 of the Netflix show One Day at a Time, entitled "Not Yet".
- In the 2018 video game Red Dead Redemption 2, Mexican gang member Javier Escuella (voiced by Gabriel Sloyer) sings the song with the rest of the gang joining in at the refrain in Chapter 4.
- On November 24, 2020, to celebrate mariachi, Google doodle released a video featuring the song.
- Reina Ley from Arizona sang this in the 22nd season of The Voice on NBC in the blind audition and chose Camila Cabello as her coach right after her performance.
- In the 1943 Mickey Rooney film The Human Comedy, Ann Ayars sings the song after Rooney's character delivers a telegram to her, but since she can't read English, he has to tell her that her son has been killed in WWII.
- The song was performed by Sylvia Lewis on The Dick Van Dyke Show, season 3, episode 6, "Too Many Stars". It featured a swinging jazz arrangement by Earle Hagen, the show's musical director.
- At the 2025 event Triplemanía XXXIII, El Grande Americano (portrayed by Ludwig Kaiser) sang the Mexican folk song Cielito Lindo during his entrance, earning a standing ovation from the Mexico City crowd.

== "Cielito lindo huasteco" ==
"Cielito Lindo" should not be confused with another popular and traditional song called "Cielito lindo huasteco" also known as "Cielito lindo" from La Huasteca in Mexico. This song, distinctly different from the common version above, has been played by many conjuntos huastecos, as it is considered one of the most popular Son Huasteco or Huapango songs. While the music is quite different, the lyrics of both songs have a similar metric structure, and both use the phrases cielito lindo and ay ay ay ay as fillers, though in different places within the stanza.

Some singers, for example Julio Iglesias, perform the song under the title De domingo a domingo, taken from the first words of the lyrics as sung in that version; as with the other song, the lyrics used vary widely among performers, and some borrow stanzas from the former. One frequently sung stanza has the words Árbol de la esperanza, mantente firme ("Tree of hope, stay firm") which appear in an eponymous painting by Frida Kahlo.

Sometimes mariachis perform combined versions of "Cielito Lindo" and "Cielito lindo huasteco" which are completely different, thus creating some confusion about both.

== See also ==
- "México Lindo y Querido", another traditional Mexican song
