= Every Best Single +3 =

Greatest hits album by Every Little Thing
- Released: March 31, 1999; January 28, 2004 (DVD Audio)
- Genres: J-pop, synthpop
- Length: 63:28 (Japanese edition); 68:02 (Asian edition)
- Label: Avex Trax
- Producer: Max Matsuura (exec.)

Every Little Thing chronology
The Remixes II (1998)	Every Best Single +3 (1999)	Eternity (2000)

Singles from Every Best Single +3
- 1. "Forever Yours" Released: June 17, 1998; 2. "Necessary" Released: September 30, 1998; 3. "Over and Over" Released: January 27, 1999; 4. "Someday, Someplace" Released: March 3, 1999

Every Best Singles +3 is the first best of album by the Japanese pop group Every Little Thing, released on March 31, 1999. It is the first album of songs from the best selling singles from the band with 2,556,314 copies sold.

== Track listing ==
No.	Title	Lyrics	Music	Arranger(s)	Length
1.	"Feel My Heart"	Mitsuru Igarashi	Igarashi	Igarashi	4:25
2.	"Future World"	Igarashi	Igarashi	Igarashi	4:07
3.	"Dear My Friend"	Igarashi	Igarashi	Igarashi	3:50
4.	"For the Moment"	Igarashi	Igarashi	Igarashi	4:33
5.	"Deatta Koro no Yō ni" (出逢った頃のように)	Igarashi	Igarashi	Igarashi	4:24
6.	"Shapes of Love"	Igarashi	Igarashi	Igarashi	4:58
7.	"Time Goes By"	Igarashi	Igarashi	Igarashi	5:12
8.	"Face the Change"	Igarashi	Igarashi	Igarashi	4:21
9.	"Forever Yours"	Igarashi	Igarashi	Igarashi	4:58
10.	"Necessary"	Igarashi	Igarashi	Igarashi	3:47
11.	"Over and Over"	Igarashi	Igarashi	Igarashi	4:44
12.	"Someday, Someplace"	Igarashi	Igarashi	Igarashi	4:32
13.	"(When) Will It Rain" (Instrumental)		Ichiro Ito	Ito, Genya Kuwajima	2:37
14.	"Kimochi" (キモチ)	Kaori Mochida	Igarashi	Igarashi	2:37
15.	"Dedicate" (Instrumental)		Igarashi	Igarashi	2:37

Asia edition bonus track
No.	Title	Lyrics	Music	Arranger(s)	Length
16.	"All Along"	Mochida, Igarashi	Igarashi	Igarashi	4:34
Total length:					62:14

== Personnel ==
- Artwork design – Keiichi Yamashita
- Co-producer – Naoto Suzuki
- Recording engineer – Masashi Hashimoto, Atsushi Hattori, Koji Morimoto
- Executive producer – Max Matsuura
- Guitar – Hidetoshi Suzuki (tracks 1, 4, 5)
- Audio mastering - Eddy Schreyer
- Mixed by – Brian Reeves, Dave Ford, Hitoshi Hiruma, Atsushi Hattori, Koji Morimoto
- Advisory producer – Ryuzo Shoji, Yasuo Shibata
- Executive supervisor – Katsuro Oshita
- General producer – Shinji Hayashi
- Specially coordinated by – Tom Yoda
- Photography – Kunihiro Takuma
- Assistant producer – Yuka Akiyama
- Synthesizer programmed by – Genya Kuwajima
- Backing vocals - Junko Hirotani (track 5)
- Acoustic guitar - Kaoru Kato (track 7)
- String arrangement - Jeremy Lubbock (track 11)

== Charts ==
Chart (1999)	Peak position
Japan Oricon	1
