= Passage to Nirvana =

2010 book by Lee Carlson

- Original book cover
- Author: Lee Carlson
- Cover artist: Michael Croteau
- Language: English
- Genre: Memoir
- Publisher: Henry Chapin & Sons
- Publication date: 2010
- Publication place: United States
- Media type: Print (hardback, paperback. E-book Kindle, epub and iPad)
- Pages: 326 p
- ISBN: 978-0-9826884-6-5
- Dewey Decimal: 813/.52 20
- LC Class: BQ9288.C375 2010

Passage to Nirvana, A Survivor's Zen Voyage: Reflections on Loss, Discovery, Healing & Hope is a memoir by Lee Carlson written over a period from 2005 to 2010, while he and his fiancée Meg were passengers on board a 60-foot sailboat named Nirvana. The memoir focuses on Carlson's recovery from a traumatic brain injury and the death of his mother from a similar injury.

== Plot summary ==
Passage to Nirvana begins with Lee Carlson's accident when he is hit by a car outside a car wash. He sustains a traumatic brain injury, including a fractured skull and bleeding inside the brain, resulting in a light coma. The narrative follows his brief hospitalization, a year-long rehabilitation in Florida, and his return to the North Fork of Long Island, where he attempts to rebuild his life. During this period, Carlson faces multiple challenges: his wife has left him with their children, his business has collapsed, and he is without a home.

While in Florida, Carlson helps care for his severely disabled mother, who suffered a traumatic brain injury from a fall. She is unable to walk, talk, or feed herself and eventually dies.

Despite the hardships, the book emphasizes healing and positive affirmation. Carlson focuses on Zen Buddhist studies and meditation, working with the writer and Zen teacher Peter Matthiessen at the Ocean Zendo. The memoir explores the spiritual aspects of healing, acceptance, and rebuilding a life.

== Writing style ==
Passage to Nirvana is structured as a series of short, interconnected essays and stories, often just a few pages long. These segments draw on Carlson's life and recovery, presenting them as moral fables. Many chapters are introduced with very brief poems, sometimes only three or four words long, which Carlson refers to as a "Po." The book's narrative is non-linear. The short poems were necessary because he initially struggled with longer sentences, the brief chapters reflected his difficulty with longer texts, and the non-linear narrative mirrored his challenges with sustained concentration. Consequently, the narrative frequently shifts in time, creating an inventive and engaging read.

== Background and publication ==
Written between 2005 and 2010, Passage to Nirvana was published in 2010. Leveraging his experience in magazine publishing, Carlson established his own publishing company, Henry Chapin and Sons, to publish and market the book. Embracing new technology and the evolving publishing industry, he used crowdfunding to finance the project. Carlson also utilized Facebook and the global network of Amazon sites to market the book and reach a worldwide audience.
