= Skiing (magazine) =

Discontinued U.S. publication for skiers

- January 1991 cover
- Categories: Sports
- Frequency: Monthly
- Format: Magazine
- Founder: Merrill Hastings
- Founded: 1948
- Final issue: Winter 2017/2018 (print)
- Country: United States
- Based in: Boulder, Colorado
- Language: English
- ISSN: 0037-6264
- OCLC: 614410857

Skiing was an American magazine devoted to skiing that was in print publication from 1948 until 2017. It was one of the two largest circulation magazines for skiers.

== Early years ==
Merrill Hastings launched Rocky Mountain Skiing in 1948, a news-oriented magazine that soon developed into a national publication. In 1950, it changed its name to the National Skiing Newspaper; it became National Skiing in 1954; and its name was changed to Skiing in 1956. The magazine competed aggressively with Ski magazine, which was run by Bill Eldred. In the early years, the magazine was not entirely objective in its reviews, favoring resorts and equipment makers who advertised in its pages. Circulation rose to almost 50,000 in the first ten years.

== New York ==
In 1964, the Ziff Davis company of New York bought Skiing magazine and Skiing Trade News from Hastings, and moved operations to New York. The company's owner, Bill Ziff, raided Ski magazine for experienced staff. Luray, the first editor, wanted a slick magazine, but Ziff had decided it should be more serious, aimed at dedicated skiers, and he replaced Luray with Doug Pfeiffer, a ski school director from California. Pfeiffer was editor in chief of Skiing magazine and its sister publications Skiing Trade News, Skiing Area News and Skiing International Yearbook from 1965 to 1976. Under Ziff, in 1965, the magazine started to issue test reports on skis. To avoid upsetting advertisers, none of the reports were negative. Due to the timing of new model releases, the skis being tested and the conditions under which they were being tested did not typically match the skis and conditions that the readers would be experiencing. Pfeiffer was followed as editor by John Jerome and then Al Greenberg.

In 1985, Ziff Davis sold Skiing and other magazines to the broadcaster CBS, and in 1987 CBS sold the magazines to Peter Diamandis. Later that year, Skiing magazine was bought for $25 million by the Times Mirror company, which also owned the rival Ski magazine. Times Mirror was purchased by the Tribune Company of Chicago in 2000, and the following year Skiing, Ski and other magazines were sold to Time4 Media, a subsidiary of Time Inc. By this time, the traditional skiing magazines were facing fierce competition from ski-related websites. In 2006, it was announced that the magazines would be sold again, to the Bonnier Group.

== Final years ==
In 2013, Skiing was purchased by Active Interest Media, a 50 magazine publisher based in Boulder, Colorado, who in the winter of 2017/2018 incorporated the assets of Skiing into its sister publication SKI magazine, ceasing its publication after nearly 70 years.

== Sources ==
- Bronski, Peter; Jory, Melissa McLean (December 7, 2012), The Gluten-Free Edge: A Nutrition and Training Guide for Peak Athletic Performance and an Active Gluten-Free Life, The Experiment, ISBN 978-1-61519-149-9
- Fry, John (December 2006), "The Ski Magazines", Skiing Heritage Journal, International Skiing History Association, ISSN 1082-2895
- Fry, John (2006b), The Story of Modern Skiing, UPNE, ISBN 978-1-58465-489-6
- Pfeiffer, Doug (September 2008). "Ski Testing: Art, Science or Fantasy Reporting?". Skiing Heritage Journal. International Skiing History Association. ISSN 1082-2895.
- "Skiing Magazine". Skiing Magazine.
- Smith, M. Scott (August 18, 2010). "Skiing Magazine Suspends Print Version". DCSki.
- "Timeline of Early U.S. Ski Periodicals". International Skiing History Association (ISHA).
