= Over Again =

Over Again may refer to:

- "Over Again", a song by Aya Kamiki and Takuya, 2021
- "Over Again", a song by Boomtown Rats from In the Long Grass, 1984
- "Over Again", a song by Cavo from Bright Nights Dark Days, 2009
- "Over Again", a song by Mike Shinoda from Post Traumatic, 2018
- "Over Again", a song by New Found Glory from Radiosurgery, 2011
- "Over Again", a song by One Direction from Take Me Home, 2012

== See also ==
- Over and Over Again (disambiguation)
