= A Wonderful Life =

A Wonderful Life may refer to:

- A Wonderful Life (Lara Fabian album) (2004)
- A Wonderful Life (Mushroomhead album) (2020)
- A Wonderful Life (Tom Odell album) (2025)
- A Wonderful Life (film), a 1951 short film starring James Dunn
- A Wonderful Life (musical), 2005, based on the film It's a Wonderful Life
- Harvest Moon: A Wonderful Life, a 2004 video game

== See also ==
- It's a Wonderful Life (disambiguation)
- Wonderful Life (disambiguation)
- Life is Wonderful (disambiguation)
- Isn't Life Wonderful (disambiguation)
- A Beautiful Life (disambiguation)
