= The Remixes (Every Little Thing album) =

Remix album by Every Little Thing
- Released: September 17, 1997
- Genre: J-pop
- Length: 72:18
- Label: AVEX Trax

Every Little Thing chronology
Everlasting (1997)	The Remixes (1997)	Time to Destination (1998)

The Remixes is the first remix album of the Japanese pop rock group Every Little Thing, released on September 17, 1997.

== Track listing ==
1. "Feel My Heart" (Plasma Mix) – 7:38
2. "Season" (Cloudy Skies Mix) – 7:41
3. "I'll get over You" (Intensive Mix) – 5:23
4. "Looking Back on Your Love" (Groove That Soul Mix) – 5:16
5. "Here and Everywhere" (Super Bootbeat Mix) – 6:12
6. "Future World" (Right Attitude Remix) – 8:33
7. "Dear My Friend" ('97 Pumped Up Mix) – 5:54
8. "Never Stop!" (Satoshi's Summer Breeze Mix) – 5:07
9. "I'll get over You" (Lightfoot's Down Beat Mix) – 5:47
10. "Tatoe tooku hanarete temo..." (たとえ遠く離れてても．．．) (Trip Strip Mix) – 6:59
11. "Future World" (Further Contact Mix) – 7:48

== Chart positions ==
Chart (1997)	Peak position
Japan Oricon	2
