= Rio Romeo =

American singer-songwriter (born 1999)

- Born: Rio Romeo; 5 January 1999 (age 27); Anaheim, California, U.S.
- Origin: Pomona, California, U.S.
- Occupations: Singer-songwriter; rapper
- Years active: 2018–present
- Label: AWAL
- Website: www.rioromeo.com

Rio Romeo (Born January 5, 1999) is an American singer-songwriter, rapper multi-instrumentalist and producer based in Pomona, California. Describing their sound as "cabaret punk" or "theatrical blues," Romeo has become a prominent figure in the indie-pop scene, particularly within the LGBTQ+ community. They are best known for their breakout singles "Nothing's New" and "Butch 4 Butch," as well as their 2025 album, Good Grief!.

== Early life and education ==
At age 18, Romeo moved to Chicago to enroll in the scenic design program at the DePaul University Theatre School. and left the program after one quarter. While living in Chicago, Romeo began using university rehearsal rooms to write songs on the piano.

== Career ==
=== 2020–2022: Viral Success and Good God! ===
Romeo returned to California during the COVID-19 pandemic and began posting content to TikTok, initially focusing on queer visibility and "lesbian vibes" rather than music. Their music career accelerated when a demo of "Butch 4 Butch" went viral in 2021. In 2022, Romeo released the EP Good God!, featuring the track "Nothing's New".

=== 2023–Present: Good Grief! album and tour ===
In 2025, Romeo released their debut full-length album, Good Grief!. The album explores themes of anger, recovery, and long-term grief. It features "JOHNNYSCOTT," a country-influenced "murder ballad" written about a real-life experience with a groomer, which Romeo described as a cathartic and "gender-affirming" expression of anger.

Romeo is known for touring with their own acoustic piano—a vintage piano tuned half a step down from 440 hz. Romeo wrote most of their early discography on this piano, which was the catalyst to Romeo now having a collection of pianos tuned half a step down. Romeo has noted "The struggle of bringing the piano everywhere is an art form in itself" In 2025, they embarked on the Good Grief! Tour, a North American headline tour where they traveled with this specific piano to have the live show matched the "warped" tonal consistency of their studio recordings.

== Public image and philanthropy ==
Romeo has defined themselves as an interdisciplinary artist and a queer advocate who hopes to help others find home within themselves.

== Personal life ==
Rio Romeo is a butch lesbian. In 2021, Romeo suffered a skateboarding accident that resulted in a traumatic brain injury (TBI). Their recovery lasted over a year.

== Discography ==
=== Albums ===
- Good Grief! (2025; AWAL Records)

=== EPs ===
- Good God! (2023; Frtyfve Records)

=== Singles ===
- "Summertime In Nevada" (13 November, 2026)
- "You're The Piece of Shit" (13 March, 2026)
- "Terminal Lovesick" (14 February, 2026)
- "Without You" (13 June, 2025)
- "God’s Got Something Out For Me (9 May, 2025)
- "JOHNNYSCOTT" (14 March, 2025)
- "Everyday is the Best Day of My Life" (2 June, 2023)
- "Over & Over" (21 April, 2023)
- "Danke Schoen" (3 February, 2023)
- "Inarticulation" (2 September, 2022)
- "Absence" (12 August, 2022)
- "Fuck The Supreme Court (Rant Song)" (6 July, 2022)
- "Bet" (14 February, 2022)
- "Fuck It" (21 November, 2021)
- "Butch 4 Butch" (14 February, 2021)
- "DYLTGIR?" (26 September, 2020)
- "Twice" (21 October, 2018)
