= Laurie J. Patterson =

American author and computer science professor

Laurie J. Patterson is an American author and computer science professor. Her books focus on the lyricists of the Tin Pan Alley era. She has also published articles on gender and technology.

== Biography ==
Patterson was born in Westbrook, Minnesota. She attended the University of Minnesota, receiving a Bachelor of Arts in Biology and a Master of Education in Training and development focusing on Information Technology training. She received her Doctor of Education from Nova Southeastern University in Computer Information Technology.

Patterson is a professor in Department of Computer Science and Information Technology at the University of North Carolina Wilmington. From 2013 to 2017, she served as the Department Chair. Upon the creation of two new colleges, Patterson was appointed Associate Dean of Academic Affairs and Curriculum for the College of Science & engineering.

Her husband and co-author was English literature professor Philip Furia.

== Works ==
- The Songs of Hollywood, with Philip Furia (2010)
- The American Song Book: The Tin Pan Alley Era, with Philip Furia (2015)
- The Poets of Tin Pan Alley: A History of America's Great Lyricists, 2nd edition, with Philip Furia (2022)
