= Wonderful Life =

Wonderful Life may refer to:

- Wonderful Life (book), a 1989 book on evolution by Stephen Jay Gould

== Film and television ==
- Wonderful Life (1964 film), 1964 film starring Cliff Richard
- Wonderful Life (2018 film), a 2017 fantasy film directed by Jo Won-hee
- Wonderful Life, original Japanese title of After Life, a 1998 Japanese film directed by Hirokazu Koreeda
- Wonderful Life (2004 TV series), 2004 Japanese television drama
- Wonderful Life (2005 TV series), 2005 South Korean television drama

== Music ==
=== Albums ===
- Wonderful Life (Black album), 1987
- Wonderful Life (Cliff Richard album), 1964

=== Songs ===
- "Wonderful Life" (Black song), the title track from the 1987 album
- "Wonderful Life" (Bring Me The Horizon song), 2019
- "Wonderful Life" (Hurts song), 2010
- "Wonderful Life", a song by Alter Bridge from their 2010 album AB III
- "Wonderful Life", a song and title track from the 1964 Cliff Richard with the Shadows album Wonderful Life
- "Wonderful Life", a song by Estelle from her 2012 album All of Me
- "Wonderful Life", a song by Gwen Stefani from her 2006 album The Sweet Escape
- "Wonderful Life", a song by Nick Cave and the Bad Seeds from their 2003 album Nocturama
- "Wonderful Life", a song by T.I. from his 2012 album Trouble Man: Heavy Is the Head

== See also ==
- A Wonderful Life (disambiguation)
- It's a Wonderful Life (disambiguation)
- Isn't Life Wonderful (disambiguation)
- Life is Wonderful (disambiguation)
- Beautiful Life (disambiguation)
