= Where Will the Dimple Be? =

1955 single by Rosemary Clooney

Single by Rosemary Clooney and The Mellomen
- B-side: "Brahms' Lullaby (Close Your Eyes)"
- Released: March 12, 1955
- Recorded: January 13, 1955
- Genre: Pop
- Length: 2:22
- Label: Columbia
- Songwriter(s): Al Hoffman, Bob Merrill
- Producer(s): The Buddy Cole Quartet, The Mellomen

Rosemary Clooney and The Mellomen singles chronology
"Open Up Your Heart (And Let the Sunshine In)" (1955)	"Where Will the Dimple Be?" (1955)	"Love Among the Young" (1955)

"Where Will the Dimple Be?" is a 1955 single by Rosemary Clooney supported by the Buddy Cole Quartet, the Mellomen, and the bass solo of Thurl Ravenscroft, about a pregnant wife speculating where her baby's dimple will be. Clooney recorded the song on January 13, 1955, just weeks before the birth of her son Miguel Ferrer on February 7, 1955. The song was also covered by Alma Cogan and Lorrae Desmond (with Bob Sharples and His Music, and The Melodaires).

The Clooney version did not chart in the USA despite Billboard magazine of March 12, 1955 saying "The sales curve on this disk is also showing a fine upward slope after little more than 10 days in the field" but it was very popular in the UK where it reached No. 6 in the charts in 1955 during a 15-week stay.
