= Time to Destination =

1998 album by Every Little Thing

Studio album by Every Little Thing
- Released: April 15, 1998
- Recorded: 1997–1998
- Genre: Pop rock, J-pop
- Length: 46:33
- Label: Avex Trax
- Producer: Max Matsuura; Mitsuru Igarashi; Naoto Suzuki

Every Little Thing chronology
The Remixes (1997)	Time to Destination (1998)	The Remixes II (1998)

Singles from Time to Destination
- 1. "For the Moment" Released: June 4, 1997; 2. "Deatta Koro no Yō ni" Released: August 6, 1997; 3. "Shapes of Love" Released: October 22, 1997; 4. "Face the Change" Released: January 7, 1998; 5. "Time Goes By" Released: February 11, 1998

Time to Destination is the second studio album by the Japanese pop rock group Every Little Thing. It was released on April 15, 1998, through Avex Trax. The album was solely written, composed and arranged by Mitsuru Igarashi, while Avex chairman Max Matsuura served as its executive producer. Musically, Time to Destination is a soft rock album and lyrically focuses on themes of love, saudades, frustration of life, loneliness, and individualism.

Upon its release, Time to Destination received favorable reviews from music critics, many of whom highlighted the singles as some of their best work. Commercially, the album was a huge success in Japan. It is the best-selling album from the band, with 3.5 million copies sold, also becoming the 10th best-selling album of all time in Japan. The album received a triple million certification from the Recording Industry Association of Japan (RIAJ) for physical shipments of three million units.

To promote the album, Every Little Thing released 5 singles. One of the singles, "For the Moment," became their first single to top the Oricon Singles Chart, with "Face the Change" also topping the chart. "Time Goes By" sold over one million units, a first for the band, becoming their biggest song to date. The majority of the album's material were promoted through Japanese commercials, which later became a staple for Every Little Thing's future work, and some songs appeared on various remix albums conducted by Every Little Thing.

== Background and composition ==
In April 1997, Every Little Thing released their debut album Everlasting. The album was a commercial success, reaching number one on the Oricon Albums Chart and being certified 3× Platinum by the RIAJ. After the success of Everlasting, Every Little Thing's keyboardist Mitsuru Igarashi began writing songs for his band's next studio album. Kaori Mochida served as the record's primary vocalist. Recording sessions were handled in Japan and recorded by Atsushi Hattori, Koji Morimoto and Masashi Hashimoto. The album was mixed by Atsushi Hattori, Bill Drescher, Brian Reeves, Hitoshi Himura and Koji Morimoto. The final project was mastered by Eddy Schreyer and Gene Grimaldi at Oasis Mastering at Burbank, California.

== Track listing ==
All songs written, composed and arranged by Mitsuru Igarashi, unless otherwise noted.

CD
No.	Title	Lyrics	Arranger	Length
1.	"For the Moment"			4:33
2.	"Ima Demo... Anata ga Suki Dakara (今でも・・・あなたが好きだから)"			4:49
3.	"Face the Change"			4:22
4.	"Old Dreams" (Instrumental)			0:24
5.	"Monokuroomu (モノクローム; Monochrome)"			3:57
6.	"All along"	Kaori Mochida		4:35
7.	"Hometown"			4:32
8.	"Deatta Koro no Yō ni (出逢った頃のように)"			4:24
9.	"Shapes of Love"			4:57
10.	"True Colors"			4:43
11.	"Time Goes By" (Orchestra Version)		Mitsuru Igarashi, Strings arrangement： Jeremy Lubbock	5:14

== Charts ==
=== Weekly charts ===
Weekly chart performance for Time to Destination
Chart (1998)	Peak position
Japan (Oricon)	1
