= It's a Wonderful Lie =

It's a Wonderful Lie may refer to:

- "It's a Wonderful Lie" (House), an episode of House, M.D.
- "It's a Wonderful Lie", an episode of The Fresh Prince of Bel-Air
- "It's a Wonderful Lie", an episode of The Riches
- ”It’s a Wonderful Lie”, a Christmas podcast released by Ashley Flowers

== See also ==
- It's a Wonderful Life (disambiguation)
