= Life Is Wonderful (disambiguation) =

Life is wonderful may refer to:

== Film ==
- Life Is Wonderful (Dutch: Het leven is vurrukkulluk), a 2018 Dutch romantic comedy film
- Life is Wonderful (film), a 2017 documentary film directed by Nicholas Stadlen about the Rivonia trial
- Life is wonderful (film), a 1999 documentary by Marcus Vetter

== Television ==
- Zindagi Gulzar Hai (Urdu: زندگی گلزار ہے; English: "Life is Wonderful"), a 2010s Pakistani TV show
- Life is wonderful (1993 TV series) (Japanese: 素晴らしきかな人生, romanized: Subarashikikana Jinsei), a 1993 Japanese TV drama starring Rie Tomosaka
- Life is wonderful (Greek: Η ζωή είναι ωραία, romanized: I zoi ine orea), a 2008 Cypriot TV show, an adaptation of the telenovela Los Roldán
- Life is Wonderful (Georgian: ცხოვრება მშვენიერია), a Georgian TV show on First Channel (Georgian TV channel)

== Music ==
- "Life is Wonderful" (video), a 2007 music video by Jason Mraz; see Jason Mraz discography

=== Songs ===
- "Life Is Wonderful" (song), a 1975 tune off the soundtrack of the film Pravaham
- "Life Is Wonderful" (song), a 1977 song by Wizzo Band off the album Super Active Wizzo
- "Life Is Wonderful" (song), a 2005 song by Jason Mraz off the album Mr. A–Z
- "Life is Wonderful" (song), a 2014 song by Rickie-G off the album Terrace House Tunes; see Terrace House: Boys × Girls Next Door
- "Life Is Wonderful" (Japanese: 人生は素晴らしい, romanized: Jinsei wa Subarashii), a 2016 song by Johnny's West, the theme song for the Japanese TV anime cartoon show Ace Attorney (TV series)

== Other uses ==
- "Life is Wonderful" (exhibition), an art exhibition of works by David Goldberg at the Hout Bay Museum
- "Life is wonderful" (French: C'est beau, la vie), a quote from the film The Hunchback of Notre Dame (1956 film)
- "Life is wonderful", a quote from the film Virus (1980 film)

== See also ==
- Isn't Life Wonderful (disambiguation)
- It's a Wonderful Life (disambiguation)
- A Wonderful Life (disambiguation)
- Wonderful Life (disambiguation)
- Life Is Beautiful (disambiguation)
