= Shapes of Love/Never Stop! =

"Shapes of Love / Never Stop!"

Single by Every Little Thing

from the album Time to Destination
- Released: October 22, 1997
- Genre: J-pop
- Length: 4:55 (Shapes of Love only)
- Label: avex trax
- Songwriter(s): Mitsuru Igarashi

Every Little Thing singles chronology
"Deatta Koro no Yō ni" (1997)	"Shapes of Love / Never Stop!" (1997)	"Face the Change" (1998)

"Shapes of Love / Never Stop!" is a single by the Japanese J-pop group Every Little Thing, released as their sixth single on October 22, 1997. It was used as the theme song for the drama Kenshūi Nanako.

== Track listing ==
1. Shapes of Love (Words & music - Mitsuru Igarashi)
2. Never Stop! (27 hours version) (Words - Kaori Mochida / music - Mitsuru Igarashi)
3. Shapes of Love (instrumental)
4. Never Stop! (27 hours version) (instrumental)

== Charts and sales ==
Chart (1997)	Peak position	Sales
Japan Oricon Singles Chart	3	About 502,000
