= Over and Over Again (Robby Valentine song) =

1991 single by Robby Valentine

Single by Robby Valentine

from the album Robby Valentine
- B-side: "I'm Searching"
- Released: August 5, 1991
- Genre: Hard rock; soft rock; glam metal; AOR
- Length: 4:20
- Label: Polydor
- Songwriter: Robby Valentine
- Producer: Humperto Gatica

Robby Valentine singles chronology
"Over and Over Again" (1991)	"Love Takes Me Higher" (1992)

"Over and Over Again" is a power ballad by the Dutch singer-songwriter Robby Valentine from his self-titled album released in 1992. It was his biggest hit single, peaked at #6 on Dutch Singles Chart.

== Charts ==
Chart (1991)	Peak position
Belgium (Ultratop 50 Flanders)	25
Netherlands (Dutch Top 40)	6
