= Necessary (song) =

"NECESSARY"

Single by Every Little Thing

from the album Every Best Single +3
- Released: September 30, 1998
- Genre: J-pop
- Length: 3:47 (Necessary only)
- Label: avex trax
- Songwriter(s): Mitsuru Igarashi

Every Little Thing singles chronology
| "Forever Yours" (1998) | "NECESSARY" (1998) | "Over and Over" (1999) |

"Necessary" is a song by the Japanese J-pop group Every Little Thing, released as their tenth single on September 30, 1998.

== Track listing ==
1. Necessary (Words & music - Mitsuru Igarashi)
2. Necessary (D'Ambrosio club mix)
3. Necessary (instrumental)

== Charts ==
| Chart (1998) | Peak position |
|---|---|
| Japan Oricon Singles Chart | 2 |
