= Forever Yours (Every Little Thing song) =

Single by Every Little Thing

from the album Every Best Single +3
- Released: June 17, 1998
- Genre: J-pop
- Length: 4 min 57 sec.
- Label: avex trax
- Songwriter: Mitsuru Igarashi

Every Little Thing singles chronology
"Time Goes By" (1998)	"Forever Yours" (1998)	"Necessary" (1998)

"Forever Yours" is a song by Japanese J-pop group Every Little Thing, released as the group's ninth single on June 17, 1998. It was their third single to hit the top spot on the Oricon chart.

== Track listing ==
1. Forever Yours
  (Words & Music - Mitsuru Igarashi)
2. Forever Yours (Angelic Summer Mix)
3. Forever Yours (Instrumental)

== Charts ==
Chart (1998)	Peak position
Japan Oricon	1
