= México Lindo y Querido =

Traditional mariachi and ranchera song

"México lindo y querido" is a traditional mariachi and ranchera Mexican song written by Chucho Monge and made famous by singer Jorge Negrete ("the singing charro"). He sang it in the 1952 movie Forever Yours.

It is widely known throughout the Spanish-speaking world for its characterization of patriotism and loyalty for the land of Mexico. It has been covered by many well-known artists, including Vicente Fernández, Ana Gabriel, Bertín Osborne, and Pedro Fernández.

The most recognizable stanza of the song states:

Spanish	English Translation
México lindo y querido Si muero lejos de ti Que digan que estoy dormido Y que me traigan aquí	Lovely, beloved Mexico; If I die far from you May they say that I'm asleep And may they bring me back here

== See also ==
- "Cielito Lindo"
- "La Bamba"
