= For the Moment (Every Little Thing song) =

1997 single by Every Little Thing

Single by Every Little Thing

from the album Time to Destination
- Released: June 4, 1997
- Genre: J-pop
- Length: 4:32
- Label: Avex Trax
- Songwriter: Mitsuru Igarashi

Every Little Thing singles chronology
"Dear My Friend" (1997)	"For the Moment" (1997)	"Deatta Koro no Yō ni" (1997)

"For the Moment" is a song by the J-pop group Every Little Thing, released as their fourth single on June 4, 1997. It was their first single to top the Oricon chart.

== Track listing ==
(According to Oricon)

1. For the Moment
2. For the Moment (remix 7.00)
3. For the Moment (instrumental)

== Chart ==
=== Weekly charts ===
Weekly chart performance for "For the Moment"
Chart (1997)	Peak position
Japan (Oricon)	1
