= With You in Mind (album) =

Studio album by Alma Cogan
- Released: 1961
- Recorded: 1961
- Label: Columbia, EMI Records
- Producer: Norman Newell

Alma Cogan chronology
I Love to Sing (1958)	With You in Mind (1961)	How About Love! (1962)

Professional ratings
Review scores
Source	Rating
Allmusic	4.5/5 stars
New Record Mirror	4/5

With You in Mind is Alma Cogan's second album, issued in 1961. It was her first album to be released on Columbia Records, an EMI Records label.

The original mono version of the album was re-issued on compact disc by EMI Records in 2003, combined with Cogan's previous album, I Love to Sing. The stereo versions of the album release are included on the 2001 EMI Records 4-CD boxset, The Girl With a Laugh in Her Voice.

== Track listing ==
Side one

1. "With You in Mind" (Cyril Ornadel, David West)
2. "I Dream of You (More than You Dream I Do)" (Marjorie Goetschius, Edna Osser)
3. "Let's Fall In Love" (Harold Arlen, Ted Koehler)
4. "Fly Me to the Moon" (Bart Howard)
5. "My Heart Stood Still" (Richard Rodgers, Lorenz Hart)
6. "But Beautiful" (Jimmy Van Heusen, Johnny Burke)

Side two

7. "You'll Never Know" (Harry Warren, Mack Gordon)
8. "All I Do Is Dream of You" (Nacio Herb Brown, Arthur Freed)
9. "What Is There to Say" (Vernon Duke, Yip Harburg)
10. "Don't Blame Me" (Jimmy McHugh, Dorothy Fields)
11. "Falling in Love with Love" (Richard Rodgers, Lorenz Hart)
12. "The More I See You" (Harry Warren, Mack Gordon)

=== CD bonus track ===
13."When I Fall in Love" (Edward Heyman, Victor Young)

== Performance ==
Alma Cogan - vocal

- with Geoff Love & His Orchestra (tracks 1, 4, 6, 7, 12)
- with Tony Osborne & His Orchestra (tracks 2, 9, 10)
- with Stan Foster & His Orchestra (tracks 3, 5, 8, 11)
