= Trajano de Moraes =

- Municipality
- Município de Trajano de Moraes
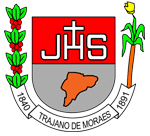
- Flag Coat of arms

- Location of Trajano de Moraes in the state of Rio de Janeiro

- Location of Trajano de Moraes in Brazil
- Coordinates: 22°03′48″S 42°03′59″W
- Country: Brazil
- Region: Southeast
- State: Rio de Janeiro

Government
  - Prefeito: Rodrigo Freire Viana (DEM)

Area
  - Total: 589.397 km^{2} (227.567 sq mi)
- Elevation: 795 m (2,608 ft)

Population (2020)
  - Total: 10,640
- Time zone: UTC−3 (BRT)

Trajano de Moraes (Portuguese pronunciation: [tɾaˈʒɐ̃nu dʒi moˈɾajs]) is a municipality located in the Brazilian state of Rio de Janeiro. It is located in the mountain region of northern Rio de Janeiro state at 22º03'48" south latitude and 42º03'59" west longitude, altitude 795 metres (2,608 ft). Its population was 10,640 (2020) and its area is 591.151 square kilometres (228.245 sq mi).
