= Everlasting (Every Little Thing album) =

Studio album by Every Little Thing
- Released: April 9, 1997
- Genre: Pop rock, J-pop
- Length: 47:30
- Label: AVEX Trax

Every Little Thing chronology
Everlasting (1997)	The Remixes (1998)

Singles from Everlasting
- 1. "Feel My Heart" Released: August 7, 1996; 2. "Future World" Released: October 23, 1996; 3. "Dear My Friend" Released: January 22, 1997; 4. "Never Stop!" Released: October 22, 1997

Everlasting is the debut album by the Japanese pop rock group Every Little Thing, released on April 9, 1997.

== Track listing ==
Unless otherwise stated, Mitsuru Igarashi wrote the lyrics, composed and arranged the music.

CD
No.	Title	Lyrics	Music	Length
1.	"Future World"			4:07
2.	"Feel My Heart" (Album Mix)			4:26
3.	"Here and Everywhere"	Kaori Mochida		3:58
4.	"Season" (Album Version)			5:52
5.	"Futari de Jidai o Kaete Mitai (二人で時代を変えてみたい)"	Masanori Nagaoka		4:57
6.	"Tatoe Tooku Hanarete Temo... (たとえ遠く離れてても．．．)"			5:10
7.	"micro stress"		Ichirō Itō	0:19
8.	"Dear My Friend" (Album Mix)			3:49
9.	"Looking Back on Your Love"			4:59
10.	"Never Stop!"	Kaori Mochida		4:21
11.	"I'll Get over You"			4:38
12.	"Double Moon"		Ichiro Ito	0:54

== Charts ==
Release	Chart	Peak position	Sales total
April 9, 1997	Oricon Daily Albums Chart	1	
April 9, 1997	Oricon Weekly Albums Chart	1	1,922,160 copies sold
