= Pray/Get into a Groove =

"Pray / Get into a Groove"

Single by Every Little Thing

from the album Eternity
- Released: January 1, 2000
- Genre: J-pop
- Length: 9:58 ("Pray" and "Get Into A Groove" only)
- Label: avex trax
- Songwriter(s): Mitsuru Igarashi

Every Little Thing singles chronology
"Over and Over / ELT Songs from L.A." (1999)	"Pray / Get into a Groove" (2000)	"Sure" (2000)

"Pray / Get into a Groove" is a song by the J-pop group Every Little Thing, released as their fourteenth single on January 1, 2000. The single was released with Avex Music Creative, Inc.

== Track listing ==
1. Pray (Words & music - Mitsuru Igarashi)
2. Get into a Groove (Words & music - Mitsuru Igarashi)
3. Pray (Ramdoubler's remix)
4. Get into a Groove (HAL's remix)
5. Pray (instrumental)
6. Get into a Groove (instrumental)

== Charts ==
Chart (2000)	Peak position
Japan Oricon Singles Chart	2
