= I Love to Sing =

Studio album by Alma Cogan
- Released: 1958
- Recorded: 1958
- Genre: Pop
- Labels: His Master's Voice, EMI Records

Alma Cogan chronology
I Love to Sing (1958)	With You in Mind (1961)

Professional ratings
Review scores
Source	Rating
Allmusic	3.5/5 stars

I Love to Sing is Alma Cogan's first album, released in 1958 on the His Master's Voice label. All the tracks on the album were arranged by Frank Cordell.

The original mono recording has been re-issued on compact disc by EMI Records in 2003, combined with her next album, With You in Mind. All tracks were also included on the EMI Records 4-CD boxset The Girl with a Laugh in Her Voice in 2001.

== Track listing ==
Side one

1. "I Love to Sing" (Paul Misraki, Michael Carr, Tommie Connor)
2. "Life Is Just a Bowl of Cherries" (Ray Henderson, Buddy G. DeSylva, Lew Brown)
3. "They Can't Take That Away from Me" (George Gershwin, Ira Gershwin)
4. "Taking a Chance on Love" (Vernon Duke, John Latouche, Ted Fetter)
5. "Ain't We Got Fun" (Richard A. Whiting, Raymond Egan, Gus Kahn)
6. "You Do Something to Me" (Cole Porter)

Side two

1. "Today I Love Everybody" (Harold Arlen, Dorothy Fields)
2. "Cheek to Cheek" (Irving Berlin)
3. "If This Isn't Love" (Burton Lane, E. Y. Harburg)
4. "As Time Goes By" (Herman Hupfeld)
5. "Comes Love" (Sam Stept, Charles Tobias, Lew Brown)
6. "Blue Skies" (Irving Berlin)

== Personnel ==
- Alma Cogan – vocal
- Frank Cordell & His Orchestra
