= Eternity (Every Little Thing album) =

Studio album by Every Little Thing
- Released: March 15, 2000
- Genre: Pop rock, J-pop
- Length: 49:13
- Label: AVEX Trax

Every Little Thing chronology
Every Best Single +3 (1999)	Eternity (2000)	4 Force (2001)

Singles from Eternity
- 1. "Pray" Released: January 1, 2000; 2. "Get Into A Groove" Released: January 1, 2000; 3. "Sure" Released: February 16, 2000; 4. "Rescue Me" Released: June 14, 2000; 5. "Smile Again" Released: June 14, 2000

Eternity is the third album of the Japanese pop rock group Every Little Thing, released on March 15, 2000.

== Track listing ==
CD
No.	Title	Lyrics	Music	Arranger	Length
1.	"Pray"	Mitsuru Igarashi	Mitsuru Igarashi	Mitsuru Igarashi	5:23
2.	"Reason"	Every Little Thing	Mitsuru Igarashi	Tomoki Ishizuka	4:57
3.	"Switch" (Album Mix)	Kaori Mochida	Ichiro Ito	Ichiro Ito	4:19
4.	"Just Be You"	Every Little Thing	Mitsuru Igarashi	Every Little Thing	4:14
5.	"The One Thing"	Every Little Thing	Mitsuru Igarashi	Every Little Thing	4:43
6.	"Get into a Groove"	Mitsuru Igarashi	Mitsuru Igarashi	Mitsuru Igarashi	4:35
7.	"Rescue Me"	Mitsuru Igarashi	Mitsuru Igarashi	Mitsuru Igarashi	4:17
8.	"Smile Again"	Every Little Thing	Mitsuru Igarashi	Mitsuru Igarashi	4:30
9.	"Sure" (Orchestra Version)	Kaori Mochida	Every Little Thing	Yasuhiko Hoshino	5:00
10.	"Who Cries for Me?" (Pray Reprise)	Mitsuru Igarashi	Mitsuru Igarashi	Mitsuru Igarashi	1:08
11.	"Sure" (Are You Sure? Mix)	Kaori Mochida	Every Little Thing	Remix: Naoki Atsumi	5:53

== Charts ==
=== Weekly charts ===
Chart (2000)	Peak position
Japanese Albums (Oricon)	1

=== Year-end charts ===
Chart (2000)	Position
Japanese Albums (Oricon)	16

=== Decade-end charts ===
Chart (2000–2009)	Position
Japanese Albums (Oricon)	99
