= Philip Furia =

American academic and writer (1943–2019)

Philip George Furia (November 15, 1943 – April 3, 2019) was an American author and English literature professor. His books focus on the lyricists of the Tin Pan Alley era.

== Biography ==
Furia was born in Pittsburgh, Pennsylvania, to Ethel Rose Szilagyi Furia and Philip Andrew Furia. He has a younger brother, Mark Daniel Furia. He grew up in West Mifflin, a suburb of Pittsburgh, next to Kennywood Park, an amusement park where he worked as a barker during his high school years.

In 1961, Furia graduated from Duquesne High School in Pittsburgh and attended Oberlin College in Ohio, majoring in English. Following his graduation with honors in English from Oberlin in 1965, Furia attended the University of Chicago, receiving his Master of Arts in English and creative writing in 1966. Furia then attended the University of Iowa Writers' Workshop, where he received his Master of Fine Arts in 1970. Hunkies Eat Their Young was the title of his MFA thesis. He received his PhD from the University of Iowa in 1970.

Upon receiving his degree, Furia started teaching at the University of Minnesota's Department of English in 1970. During Furia's time at the University of Minnesota, he was a visiting lecturer at the University of East Anglia in Norwich, England (1976-1977), and for the academic year 1982–1983, a Fulbright Professor at the University of Graz, Austria. In 1996, Furia left the University of Minnesota, where he had been department chair, associate chair, director of Undergraduate Studies, and associate dean for faculty of the College of Liberal Arts. In 1994, Furia served as the interim dean for the College of Arts and Sciences for Metropolitan State University in Saint Paul, Minnesota during the 1994–1995 academic year.

Furia became chair of the Department of English at the University of North Carolina Wilmington. During his tenure there, Furia was also director of the Film Studies Program, chair of the Department of Creative Writing, and interim Chair of the Department of Theatre. He was instrumental in the creation of both the creative writing department and the film studies program. He was a professor in the Department of Creative Writing, where he taught the writing of biography, popular history, and other forms of creative nonfiction. Furia also presented a weeknight segment on WHQR's The Great American Songbook with Philip Furia.

His books include The Poets of Tin Pan Alley: A History of America’s Great Lyricists (Oxford University Press, 1990); Ira Gershwin: The Art of the Lyricist (Oxford, 1996); Irving Berlin: A Life in Song (Schirmer Books/ Simon & Schuster, 1998); Skylark: The Life and Times of Johnny Mercer (St. Martin’s Press, 2003); and, with Michael Lasser, America’s Songs: The Stories Behind the Songs of Broadway, Hollywood, and Tin Pan Alley (Routledge, 2006) and, with Laurie Patterson, The Songs of Hollywood (Oxford, 2010), His writings on classic American popular songs have been praised in The New York Times, The Atlantic Monthly, 'The New Yorker, and many other magazines, journals, and newspapers. He has been interviewed on Larry King Live!, NPR’s All Things Considered, and Fresh Air with Terry Gross, several PBS television specials, and other radio and television programs. In Wilmington NC, he hosted a daily radio program, “The Great American Song Book” on local public radio station WHQR.

Along with Wendy and Gerald Fingerhut, Nancy King, Paul Albritton, David Williams, Jeannette Callison, Melvin Ezzel, Lynn O'Connell, Jack Sauer, and Robert Sherman, Furia was one of the founding members of the board of directors for Opera Wilmington.

Furia died on April 3, 2019 in Wilmington, NC.

== Honors and awards ==
Undergraduate

- Knight Scholarship, 1961–1965, Oberlin College

Graduate

- Ford Foundation Fellowship, 1965–1966, University of Chicago
- Teaching-Research Fellowship, 1967–1969, University of Iowa
- Sloan Doctoral Fellowship, 1969–1970, University of Iowa

Professional

- Fulbright Professorship, 1982–1983, University of Graz, Austria
- Distinguished Teaching Award, 1989, University of Minnesota, College of Continuing Education and Extension
- Scholar of the college, 1991–1994, University of Minnesota
- Cahill Grant, 1997–1998, University of North Carolina Wilmington
- Presented with Key to the City of Savannah by Mayor Floyd Adams for writing Skylark: The Life and Times of Johnny Mercer, 2003
- Awarded annual cash prize for editing American Lyricists, 1920-1960, which was voted the best volume in the series for 2002

== Works ==
- Pound's Cantos Declassified (1984)
- The Poets of Tin Pan Alley: A History of America's Great Lyricists (1992)
- Ira Gershwin: The Art of the Lyricist (1996)
- Irving Berlin: A Life in Song (1997)
- Edited and contributed to American Lyricists, 1920-1960 (Detroit: Gale, 2022)
- Skylark: The Life and Times of Johnny Mercer (2004)
- America's Songs: The Stories Behind the Songs of Broadway, Hollywood, and Tin Pan Alley (2006), with Michael Lasser, host of Peabody Award-winning public radio program Fascinatin’ Rhythm
- The Songs of Hollywood, with Laurie J. Patterson (2010)
- The American Song Book: The Tin Pan Alley Era, with Laurie J. Patterson (2015)
- The Poets of Tin Pan Alley: A History of America's Great Lyricists, 2nd edition with Laurie J. Patterson (posthumously 2022)

Articles, Chapters, and Other Publications:

- "Nuances of a Theme by Milton: Wallace Stevens' 'Sunday Morning,'" American Literature, 46 (1974), 83–87.
- "Hart Crane's 'At Melville's Tombe," The Explicator, 33 (1975), Item 73.
- "'IS, the whited monster': Lowell's Quaker Graveyard Revisited," Texas Studies in Literature and Language, 17 (1976), 837–54.
- "Bloomburied Stevens" (rev. art.) Centrum 1 (1977), 58–63.
- "Stevens' Fusky Alphabet," PMLA 93 (1978), 66–77. [Co-author, Martin Roth]
- "Howells' 'Editha': The Feminine View," American Literary Realism, 12 (1979), 278–83.
- "Paterson's Progress," boundary 2, 9 (1981), 31–51.
- "Pound and Blake on Hell," Paideuma: A Journal of Ezra Pound Scholarship, 10 (1981), 599–601.
- "Halving Man/hattan: Lorenz Hart, Popular Song, and Modernist Poetry," William Carlos Williams Review, 15 (1989), 30–36.
- "Jazzing the Word/Wording the Jazz," Twin Cities Jazz Notes, 13:1 (May 1991), 1–3.
- "Irving Berlin: Troubadour of Tin Pan Alley," Inventing Times Square: Culture and Commerce in New York, ed. William Taylor (New York: The Russell Sage Foundation, 1991), 191–211.
- "The Lorenz Hart Centenary," Dictionary of Literary Biography Yearbook: 1995 (Detroit: Bruccoli Clark Layman, 1996), 241–260. Author of main essay and editor of centenary tributes by Sheldon Harnick and other lyricists and scholars.
- "'S Wonderful: Concord Jazz Salutes Ira Gershwin," CD Linder Notes for Mel Torme, Rosemary Clooney, and other jazz vocalists performing songs by Ira Gershwin (San Francisco: Concord Jazz, Inc., 1997).
- "The Ira Gershwin Centenary," Dictionary of Literary Biography Yearbook: 1996 (Detroit: Bruccoli Clark Layman, 1997), 144-171. Author of main essay and editor of tributes by Sheldon Harnick and other lyricists and scholars.
- "Love is Good for Anything that Ailes You: Songs of the 1930s," CD Liner Notes for Banu Gibson (New Orleans: Jazz Sessions, 1998).
- "Something to Sing About: A Centenary Celebration of America's Great Lyricists," The American Scholar (Summer 1997), 379-394.
- "Sinatra on Broadway," Frank Sinatra and Popular Culture: Essays on an American Icon, ed. Leonard Mustazza (London: Praeger, 1998).
- Frank Sinatra: Musician, Actor, & Quintessential Ethnic," symposium edited for Italian Americana, XIX (Winter 2001), 5-22, including his own essay "Sinatra and the Great American Song Book," 10-13.
- The Sounds of Silence: Songs in Hollywood Films since the 1960s," Style 36:1 (Spring 2002, 19-35. [co-author, Todd Berliner]

Selected National Television, Radio, and Other Interviews:

- “The Poets of Tin Pan Alley,” Larry King Live!1990; All Things Considered, 1990; The Studs Terkel Show, WFMT, Chicago,1991; return appearance on Larry King Live in conjunction with paperback publication of The Poets of Tin Pan Alley, 1993; interview rebroadcast on The Best of Larry King Live!
- “Ira Gershwin: The Art of the Lyricist,” television interview: Turner Entertainment Report, 1996; radio interviews: WBAL Philadelphia; KBEW New York; BBC London; BBC Australia; ABC Australia; WBEX Los Angeles, 1996
- “The Women of Tin Pan Alley,” PBS Special: “Yours for a Song,”1999
- “Harry Warren and Hollywood Songwriters,” two-part series, Fresh Air with Terry Gross, 1999
- Irving Berlin: An American Song, Arts & Entertainment Biography, 1999
- “Dorothy Fields,” Fresh Air Radio with Terry Gross, 1999
- PBS Broadway: The Musical (Emmy-Award winning six-part series)
- Irving Berlin’s America,” two-part program, Ben Wattenberg’s Think Tank, WNET, New York, 2002
- The Best Things in Life, four-part series on songwriters Buddy DeSylva, Brown & Henderson, BBC-2, 2002
- Soul Music, four-part series on Johnny Mercer, BBC-2, 2002
- Interviewed for U.S. News & World Report article on Irving Berlin and ragtime in special double-issue, America’s Music: From Yankee Doodle to Hip-Hop, 2006
- Skylark: The Life and Times of Johnny Mercer, Fresh Air with Terry Gross, 2003.
- Americas Songs, The Bob Edwards Show, 2006; interview, reprised as Best of Bob Edwards along with interviews with John Updike and Calvin Trillin
- I Love to Rhyme: The lyrics of Ira Gershwin, six-part series on KALW San Francisco, 2011-2014
- The Songs of Hollywood, Fresh Air with Terry Gross, 2011
- Broadway Musicals : A Jewish Legacy, PBS Special. 2013
- “Johnny Mercer and ‘Hooray for Hollywood,’” NPR Morning Edition with Susan Stamberg, 2013
- “East Village Poet: Ira Gershwin,” Morning Calm: Korean Air In-flight Magazine (August, 2013)
- “The Poets of Tin Pan Alley,” The Vintage Bandstand Blogspot,” three-part interview (January, 2013)
