= Deatta Koro no Yō ni =

Single by Every Little Thing

from the album Time to Destination
- Released: August 6, 1997
- Genre: J-pop
- Length: 4:22 (Deatta Koro no Yō ni only)
- Label: avex trax
- Songwriter: Mitsuru Igarashi

Every Little Thing singles chronology
"For the Moment" (1997)	"Deatta Koro no Yō ni" (1997)	"Shapes of Love/Never Stop!" (1997)

"Deatta Koro no Yō ni" (出逢った頃のように) is the fifth single by the Japanese J-pop group Every Little Thing, released on August 6, 1997.

== Track listing ==
1. Deatta Koro no Yō ni (Words & music - Mitsuru Igarashi)
2. Deatta Koro no Yō ni (Summer Night mix)
3. Deatta Koro no Yō ni (instrumental)

== Charts and sales ==
Chart (1997)	Peak position	Sales
Japan Oricon Singles Chart	3	602,830
