= Sure (Every Little Thing song) =

Single by Every Little Thing

from the album Eternity
- Released: February 16, 2000
- Genre: J-pop
- Length: 4:53 ("Sure" only)
- Label: avex trax
- Songwriter: Kaori Mochida

Every Little Thing singles chronology
"Pray / Get into a Groove" (2000)	"Sure" (2000)	"Rescue Me/Smile Again" (2000)

"Sure" was the fifteenth single by the Japanese J-pop group Every Little Thing, released on February 16, 2000. It was used as theme song of the drama Virtual Girl.

== Track listing ==
1. Sure (Words - Kaori Mochida / music - Every Little Thing)
2. Sure (instrumental)

== Charts ==
Chart (2000)	Peak position
Japan Oricon	3
