= John Jerome =

American writer (1932–2002)

John Jerome (November 7, 1932 - February 25, 2002) was an American writer of nonfiction. Jerome was born on November 7, 1932, in Tulsa, Oklahoma. His father was Ralph Jerome, a draftsman for oil-drilling companies, and his mother was Gwendolyn (Stewart) Jerome. He graduated from high school in New Braunfels, Texas. In 1952, he married his first wife, Nancy Sellman. They had three children, Kathleen, Martin Stewart, and Julia.

He held a B.A. from North Texas State College (now University), received in 1955. After teaching in West Texas, Jerome went to work in 1959 as an editor for Sports Car Digest in Odessa, Texas. In 1962, he moved to New York City to serve as managing editor of Car and Driver magazine until 1964. After living in Detroit for a time, working as a copywriter, in 1965 he divorced his wife, and a year later married Christine McCall, a writer and editor.

In 1967 the Jeromes moved to New England. They lived in rural New Hampshire and then in rural western Massachusetts. Jerome freelanced as an editor and magazine writer, and wrote a dozen books, as well as the annual Complete Runner’s Day-by-Day Log and Calendar which he produced from 1986 through 2003.

Perhaps his best-known book was Truck, a set of meditations on technology and work framed by the process of rebuilding an old pickup truck. Stone Work: Reflections on Serious Play and Other Aspects of Country Life also received critical acclaim.

He died in 2002 of lung cancer.

== Bibliography ==
- The Death of the Automobile: The Fatal Effect of the Golden Era, 1955–1970. W. W. Norton, 1972.
- Truck: On Rebuilding a Worn-Out Pickup and Other Post-Technological Adventures. Houghton Mifflin, 1977; Bantam, 1978; University Press of New England, 1996.
- On Mountains: Thinking About Terrain. Harcourt Brace Jovanovich, 1978; McGraw-Hill, 1979.
- The Sweet Spot in Time: The Search for Athletic Perfection. Summit, 1980; Touchstone, 1989; Breakaway Books, 1998.
- Staying With It: On Becoming an Athlete. Viking, 1984. Breakaway Books 1998.
- Staying Supple: The Bountiful Pleasures of Stretching. Bantam, 1989. Breakaway Books 1998.
- Stone Work: Reflections on Serious Play and Other Aspects of Country Life. Viking, 1989; Penguin,1990; University Press of New England, 1996; Recorded Books, 1997.
- The Writing Trade: A Year in the Life. Viking, 1992; Lyons and Burford, 1995.
- Blue Rooms: Ripples, Rivers, Pools, and Other Waters. Henry Holt, 1997.
- The Elements of Effort: Reflections on the Art and Science of Running. Breakaway Books, 1997; Pocket Books, 1998; Recorded Books, 1999.
- The Athletic Classics of John Jerome: The Sweet Spot in Time, Staying With It, Staying Supple. Breakaway Books, 1998. Boxed set.
- On Turning 65: Notes from the Field. Random House, 2000.

== External sources ==
- In Memory of John Jerome
- Review of Jerome's Truck in Pif Magazine
