= Quirino Mendoza y Cortés =

Mexican composer (1862–1957)

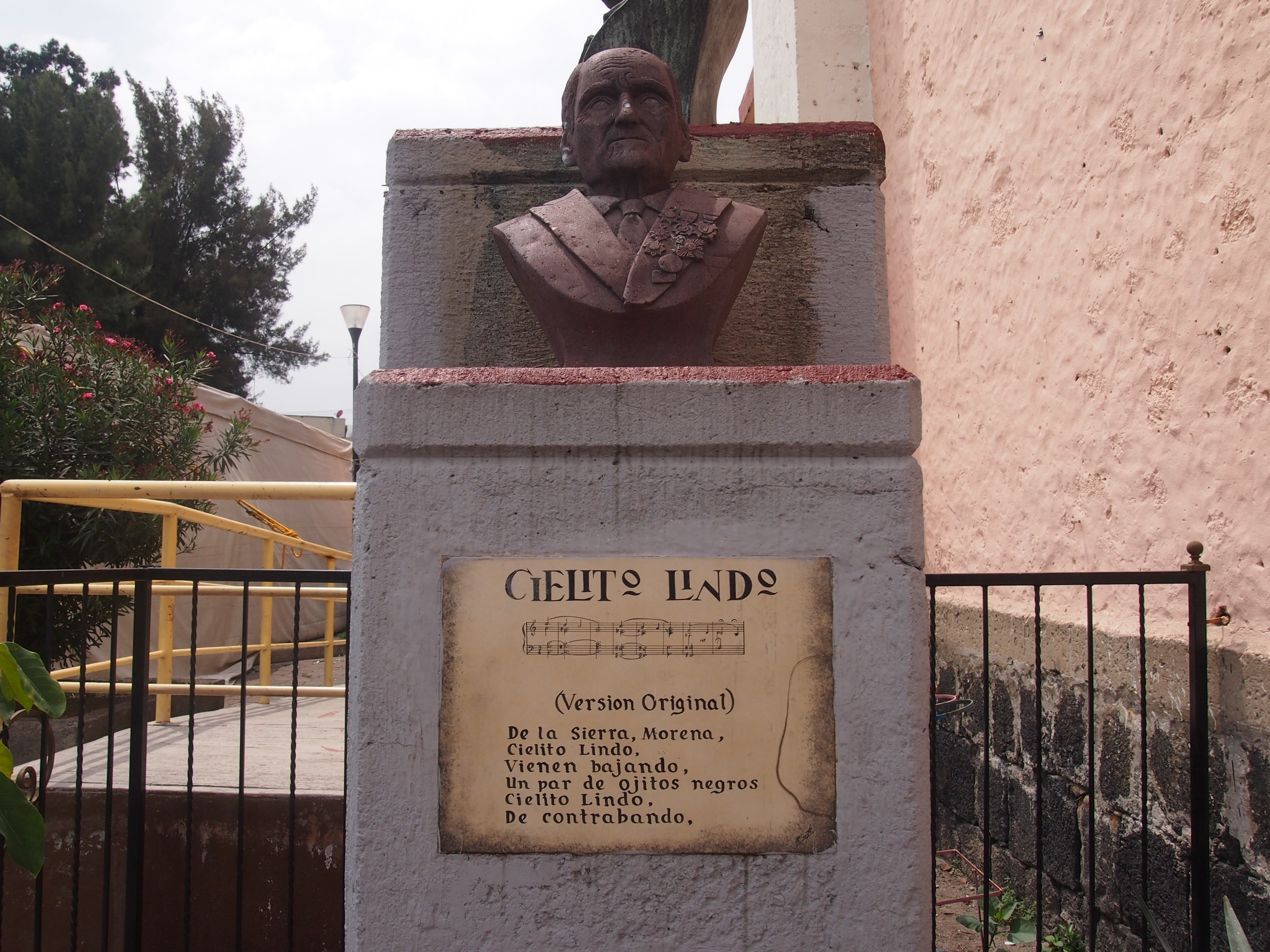
Bust of composer Quirino Mendoza y Cortés with plaque showing measures of "Cielito Lindo" and its lyrics.

Quirino Mendoza y Cortés (May 10, 1862 – 1957) was a Mexican composer of the famous traditional songs "Cielito Lindo" and "Jesusita en Chihuahua". He was born in Santiago Tulyehualco, Xochimilco, Mexico City in 1862.

== Early life ==
Cortés' father was an organist at a local parish, which originally inspired him to learn music. During his teens, he learned to play the piano, flute, violin, guitar, and the organ. He learned very quickly while taking lessons from his father, and quickly mastered these instruments in his teens. Also in his teens, he played songs at the local parish on the organ, like his father did. He then began to write his first song, 'My Blessed God.'
