= Over and Over (Every Little Thing song) =

1999 J-pop song by Every Little Thing

Single by Every Little Thing

from the album Every Best Single +3
- Released: January 27, 1999
- Genre: J-pop
- Length: 4:43 (Over and Over only)
- Label: avex trax
- Songwriter(s): Mitsuru Igarashi

Every Little Thing singles chronology
| "Necessary" (1998) | "Over and Over" (1999) | "Someday, Someplace" (1999) |

"Over and Over" is a song by the Japanese J-pop group Every Little Thing, released as the group's eleventh single on January 27, 1999. It was used for the drama Border: Hanzaishinri Sōsa File.

== Track listing ==
1. Over and Over (Words & music - Mitsuru Igarashi)
2. Over and Over: Hal's remix
3. Over and Over (instrumental)

== Charts ==
| Chart (1999) | Peak position |
|---|---|
| Japan Oricon | 4 |

== Other versions ==
"Over and Over / ELT Songs from L.A."

Single by Every Little Thing

from the album ELT Songs from L.A.
- Released: October 20, 1999
- Genre: J-pop
- Length: ?
- Label: avex trax
- Songwriter(s): Mitsuru Igarashi

Every Little Thing singles chronology
| "Someday, Someplace" (1999) | "Over and Over / ELT Songs from L.A." (1999) | "Pray / Get into a Groove" (2000) |

"Over and Over / ELT Songs from L.A." is a double A-side single, the thirteenth single released by the Japanese J-pop group Every Little Thing, released on October 20, 1999.

=== Track listing ===
1. Over and Over
2. Ima demo... Anata ga Suki Dakara (今でも・・・あなたが好きだから)
3. Looking Back On Your Love
4. Over and Over: Instrumental
5. Ima demo... Anata ga Suki Dakara (今でも・・・あなたが好きだから): Instrumental
6. Looking Back on Your Love: Instrumental
