= Rescue Me/Smile Again =

Single by Every Little Thing

from the album Eternity
- B-side: "The One Thing (single mix)"
- Released: June 14, 2000
- Genre: J-pop
- Length: 8:48 (Rescue Me and Smile Again only)
- Label: avex trax
- Songwriter: Mitsuru Igarashi

Every Little Thing singles chronology
| "Sure" (2000) | "Rescue Me/Smile Again" (2000) | "Ai no Kakera" (2000) |

"Rescue Me"/"Smile Again" is a song by the J-pop group Every Little Thing, released as their sixteenth single on June 14, 2000.

== Track listing ==
1. Rescue Me (single mix) (Words & music - Mitsuru Igarashi)
2. The One Thing (single mix) (Words - Every Little Thing / music - Mitsuru Igarashi)
3. Smile Again (Words - Every Little Thing / music - Mitsuru Igarashi)
4. Rescue Me (remix)
5. Smile Again (Dub's Knock On remix)
6. Rescue Me (instrumental)
7. The One Thing (instrumental)
8. Smile Again (instrumental)

== Charts ==
| Chart (2000) | Peak position |
|---|---|
| Japan Oricon Singles Chart | 2 |
