= Alma Cogan =

British pop singer (1932–1966)

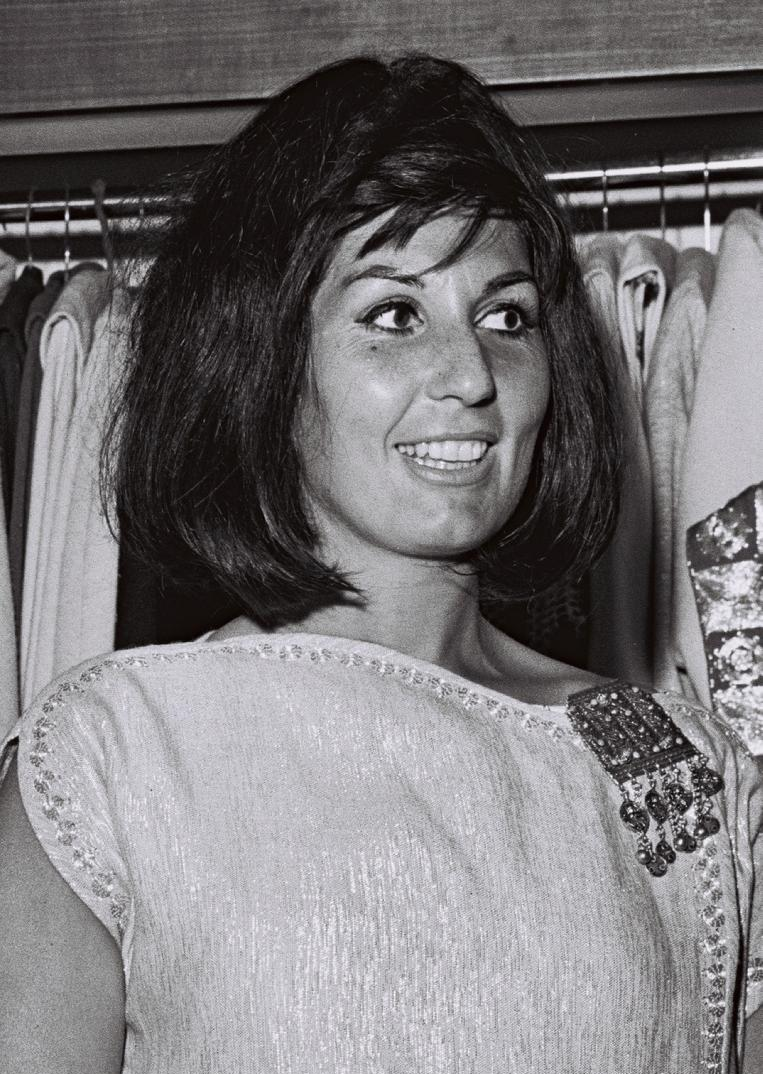
- Cogan in Tel Aviv, 1963

Background information
- Born: Alma Angela Cohen Cogan; 19 May 1932; Whitechapel, London, England
- Died: 26 October 1966 (aged 34) Fitzrovia, London, England
- Genre: Traditional pop
- Occupation: Singer
- Years active: 1952–1966
- Labels: His Master's Voice; EMI Columbia
- Website: almacogan2018.com

Alma Angela Cohen Cogan (19 May 1932 – 26 October 1966) was an English singer of traditional pop in the 1950s and early 1960s. Dubbed the "Girl with the Giggle in Her Voice", she was the highest paid British female entertainer of her era.

== Childhood and early musical career ==
Cogan was born on 19 May 1932 in Whitechapel, London. She was of Russian-Romanian Jewish descent. Her father's family, the Kogans, arrived in Britain from Russia, while her mother's family were refugees from Romania. Cogan's parents, Mark and Fay Cogan, had another daughter, the actress Sandra Caron, who went on to play Mumsey in The Crystal Maze, and one son, Ivor Cogan. Mark's work as a haberdasher entailed frequent moves. One of Cogan's early homes was over his shop in Worthing, Sussex.

Although Jewish, she attended St Joseph's Convent School in Reading. Her father was a singer, but it was Cogan's mother who had showbusiness aspirations for both her daughters: she had named Cogan after silent-screen star Alma Taylor. Cogan first performed in public at a charity show at the Palace Theatre in Reading and at the age of eleven competed in the Sussex Queen of Song contest held at a Brighton hotel, winning a prize of £5.

Aged 14, she was recommended by Vera Lynn for a variety show at the Grand Theatre in Brighton and in July 1947 she appeared there for a week with Max Miller. In November 1947 she appeared in the show Dick Turpin's Ride to York at the Grand, Brighton. At 16, she was told by bandleader Ted Heath, "You've got a good voice, but you're far too young for this business. Come back in five years' time." Heath would later say: "Letting her go was one of the biggest mistakes of my life." She also found work singing at tea dances while also studying dress design at Worthing Art College. Cogan was soon appearing as a chorus girl in the musical High Button Shoes at the London Hippodrome in November 1948, and in a revue called Sauce Tartare at the Cambridge Theatre in London in May 1949. She became resident singer at the Cumberland Hotel in London in 1949, where she was spotted by EMI producer Walter Ridley, who became her coach and signed her to His Master's Voice.

== 1950s fame ==
Cogan's first release was "To Be Worthy of You" / "Would You", recorded on her 20th birthday. This led to her appearing regularly on comedian Dick Bentley's BBC's radio show Gently Bentley and then becoming the vocalist for the BBC Radio comedy programme Take It From Here, replacing Joy Nichols, from 1953 to the end of its run in 1960.

In 1953, while in the middle of recording "If I Had a Golden Umbrella", she broke into a giggle; she then played up the effect on later recordings. Soon enough she was dubbed the "Girl with the giggle in her voice". ("Giggle" has sometimes been quoted as "chuckle".)

Many of her recordings were covers of US hits, especially those recorded by Rosemary Clooney, Teresa Brewer, Georgia Gibbs, Joni James and Dinah Shore. Her voice was often compared with Doris Day's. One of these covers, "Bell Bottom Blues", became her first hit, reaching no. 4 on 3 April 1954. Cogan would appear in the UK Singles Chart eighteen times in the 1950s, with "Dreamboat" reaching no. 1. Other hits from this period include "I Can't Tell a Waltz from a Tango", "Why Do Fools Fall in Love", "Sugartime" and "The Story of My Life". Cogan's first album, I Love to Sing, was released in 1958.

Cogan was one of the first UK recording artists to appear frequently on television, where her powerful voice could be showcased along with her bubbly personality and dramatic costumes. Her hooped skirts with sequins and figure-hugging tops were reputedly designed by her, made by her mother and never worn twice. Cliff Richard recalls: "My first impression of her was definitely frocks – I kept thinking, how many can this woman have? Almost every song had a different costume. The skirts seemed to be so wide – I don't know where they hung them up!" Cogan topped the annual NME reader's poll as "Outstanding British Female Singer" four times between 1956 and 1960.

== 1960s career ==
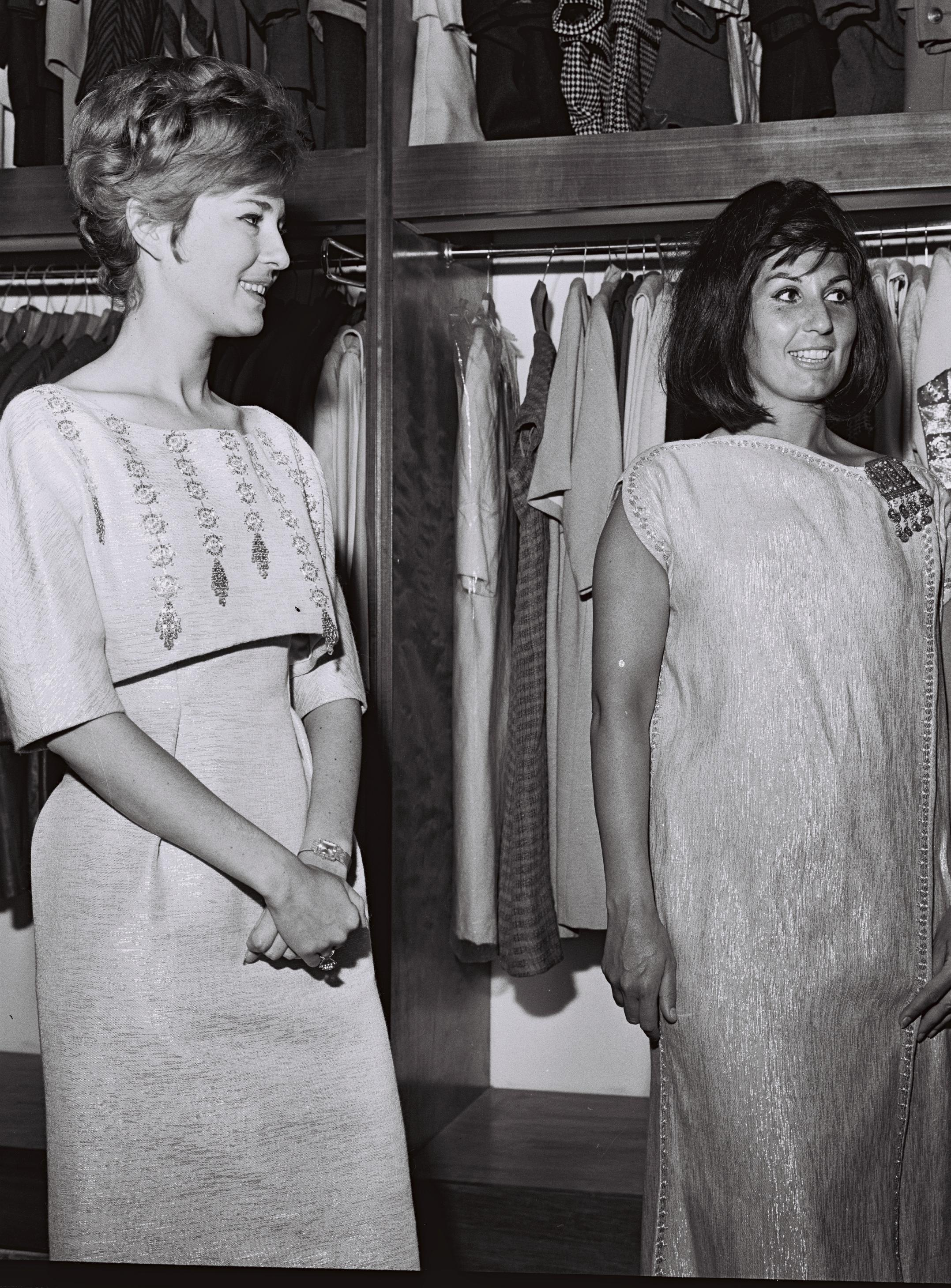
Cogan (right) with Israeli singer Ilana Rovina, Tel Aviv, 1963

The UK musical revolution of the 1960s, symbolised by the rise of the Beatles, suddenly made Cogan unfashionable; in the 1991 BBC documentary Alma Cogan: The Girl with the Giggle in Her Voice, Lionel Blair said she was perceived as "square". Her highest 1960s chart ranking in the UK was no. 26 with "We Got Love", and most of her successes at this time were outside the UK, notably in Sweden and Japan. She was especially disappointed that her 1963 cover of the Exciters' US hit "Tell Him" did not return her to the UK charts, according to singer Eddie Grassham. "Tell Him" was a hit in Sweden: it spent seven weeks in the best selling record chart "Kvällstoppen" and peaked at no. 10. In 1964, Cogan recorded "Tennessee Waltz" in a rock-and-roll ballad style; this version was no. 1 in Sweden for five weeks in the best-selling chart "Kvällstoppen" and was number 1 for eight weeks in the Swedish voting chart "Tio i Topp". "Tennessee Waltz" also reached the top 20 in Denmark, while a German language rendering reached no. 10 in Germany. She had another number-one hit in Sweden in 1965, "The Birds and the Bees". When she toured around Sweden in the mid-1960s with popular local pop bands, whose members were some ten years younger than her, she acquired the playful nickname "popmormor" (pop-grandmother).

Cogan also wrote some of her own songs. She co-wrote her 1963 record "Just Once More" (under the pseudonym of "Al Western") with her long-time pianist, Stan Foster. "Just Once More" peaked at no. 10 in the Swedish Voting Chart "Tio i Topp" in October 1963. Her 1964 single "It's You" was also a Cogan-Foster collaboration, although this time she was credited under her own name. Its B side, "I Knew Right Away", was also recorded by Little Pattie in 1967.

Paul McCartney played tambourine on "It's You". Cogan recalled in 1964 that The Beatles had been recording in the adjoining studio when she was working on the song:

The boys started making suggestions on how to improve the recording. We took their advice about double-recording my voice to sound as though I was singing a duet with myself, and then Paul came up with the idea of putting in a tambourine. All the musicians had gone home, so he went upstairs, found one, and played it while we dubbed the sound onto the tape.

There have also been suggestions that Ringo Starr performed on "It's You", but Cogan did not mention this in the 1964 quote above. However, she did suggest that all the basic tracks were completed when The Beatles heard the song.

She continued to be a popular figure on the UK showbusiness scene, being offered the part of Nancy in Oliver!, appearing on the teenage hit-show Ready Steady Go! and headlining at the Talk of the Town.

Cogan tried to update her image by recording some Beatles numbers and a spin-off from The Man from U.N.C.L.E. ("Love Ya Illya"). However, by 1965, record producers were becoming dissatisfied with Cogan's work, and it was also clear that her health was failing. Her friend and colleague Anne Shelton attributed this decline to some "highly experimental" injections she took to lose weight, claiming that Cogan was never well again after that.

== Personal life ==
Cogan lived with her widowed mother at 44 Stafford Court, Kensington High Street, in a lavishly decorated flat where she frequently entertained other celebrities. She was close to the Beatles' manager, Brian Epstein. Regular visitors included Princess Margaret, Noël Coward, Cary Grant, Audrey Hepburn, Elizabeth Taylor, Michael Caine, Frankie Vaughan, Bruce Forsyth and Roger Moore.

John Lennon once recalled that, when he was a teenager, he used to mimic her savagely during his time at the Liverpool College of Art. Lennon's wife Cynthia also recalled, "John and I had thought of Alma [as] out of date and unhip." However, after Lennon met Cogan on the TV pop show Ready Steady Go! in 1964, they became friends.

Cogan was also close to the other Beatles, especially Paul McCartney, who played the melody of "Yesterday" on her piano. It was there that he added the words "scrambled eggs" to the nameless melody. The 1987 compilation album A Celebration includes a testimonial from McCartney:

When the Beatles first came to London, Alma was lovely to us... welcoming us with open arms. All my memories of that time are very special to me. Her high spirits made being with her great fun. I will always remember Alma and her sweet music with great fondness.

== Illness and death ==
Cogan embarked on a series of club dates in England in early 1966, but collapsed after two performances. She made her final TV appearance in August, in a guest spot on International Cabaret. The following month she collapsed while touring Sweden to promote "Hello Baby", recorded exclusively for the Swedish market. She died of ovarian cancer at London's Middlesex Hospital on 26 October, at the age of 34.

In deference to family custom, her death was observed with traditional Jewish rites, with burial at the Jewish Cemetery in Bushey, Hertfordshire.

== Legacy ==
The novel Alma Cogan by Gordon Burn presents an imaginary middle-aged Cogan still alive in the 1980s and looking back on her life and fame. Based on true events and real people, aside from the device of denying her early death, it won the Whitbread Book Award in 1991. The BBC Radio 4 series Stage Mother, Sequinned Daughter (2002) by Annie Caulfield was partly adapted from this novel. Cogan's sister, Sandra, felt that it misrepresented both Cogan and her mother and tried unsuccessfully to get it banned. Eventually the Broadcasting Standards Commission ruled that the BBC apologise to Sandra for failing to respect the feelings of surviving family members.

The romantic comedy In Love with Alma Cogan is a film starring Roger Lloyd-Pack. He is an ageing manager of an old-fashioned pier theatre. It leads to a flashback to his encounter with Cogan, who performed at the theatre in his youth.

A blue plaque commemorating Cogan was installed at the entrance of 44 Stafford Court, her long-time residence, on 4 November 2001. A second blue plaque was unveiled at Cogan's old home, 29 Lansdowne Road, Worthing, in September 2017 by the entertainer Lionel Blair, who had been a friend of Cogan. The plaque was organised by Cogan's fans, together with the Worthing Society.
