= Meili Rensheng =

美麗人生, meaning "beautiful life", may refer to:

- Beautiful (Fish Leong album), a 2003 album of Fish Leong
- Beautiful Life, a 2012 album of Fala Chen
- "Life Is Beautiful", a soundtrack for the Taiwanese television series Back to 1989
- Life Is Beautiful, a 2005 Taiwanese television series starring Wang Shih-hsien
- Life Is Beautiful, a 2022 Taiwanese television series starring Chloe Wang, Fon Cin and Jeff Wang
- Reaching Out (TV series), a 2001 Hong Kong television drama produced by TVB

== See also ==
- A Beautiful Life (disambiguation)
- Beautiful Life (disambiguation)
  - Bella Vita (disambiguation), "Beautiful Life" in Italian
  - Belle vie (disambiguation), "Beautiful Life" in French
- Life Is Beautiful (disambiguation)
  - La Vie est Belle (disambiguation), "Life is Beautiful" in French
  - La vita è bella (disambiguation), "Life is Beautiful" in Italian
- It's a Beautiful Life (disambiguation)
- 人生 (disambiguation)
