= A Beautiful Life =

A Beautiful Life may refer to:

- A Beautiful Life (2008 film), an American drama by Alejandro Chomski
- A Beautiful Life (2011 film), a Hong Kong romance by Andrew Lau
- A Beautiful Life (2023 film), a Danish music romance

== See also ==
- Beautiful Life (disambiguation)
- Life Is Beautiful (disambiguation)
- It's a Beautiful Life (disambiguation)
- Bella Vita (disambiguation), "Beautiful Life" in Italian
- Belle vie (disambiguation), "Beautiful Life" in French
- 美麗人生 (disambiguation), "Beautiful Life" in Chinese
- A Wonderful Life (disambiguation)
