= Buona Vita =

Buona vita (good life) may refer to:

== Music ==
- Buona Vita (Gigi D'Alessio album), 2003
- Buona Vita (Katy Garbi album)
- "Buona Vita", song by Eros Ramazzotti Dove c'è musica 2006
- "Buona Vita", song by Ornella Vanoni, 2007, re-recorded as duet Katy Garbi
- "Buona Vita", song by Liana Orfei

== Other ==
- Buona Vita, clothing retail shop in Japan, Shakujii-kōen Station

== See also ==
- Bella Vita (disambiguation)
