= Beautiful Life =

Beautiful Life may refer to:

== Music ==
=== Albums ===
- Beautiful Life (Bruce Guthro album), 2006
- Beautiful Life (Dianne Reeves album), 2014
- Beautiful Life (Doc Walker album), 2008
- Beautiful Life (Guy Sebastian album), 2004
- Beautiful Life (Jimmy Greene album), 2014
- Beautiful Life (Martha Davis album), 2008
- Beautiful Life (Shy Nobleman album), 2005
- Beautiful Life (Vallejo album), 1998
- Beautiful Life (Chuck Brown album), 2014
- Beautiful Life (Rick Astley album), 2018
- Beautiful Life: The Singles, a 2023 box set by Ace of Base

=== Songs ===
- "Beautiful Life" (Ace of Base song), 1995
- "Beautiful Life", a song by Måns Zelmerlöw from the album Barcelona Sessions
- "Beautiful Life" (Armin van Buuren song), 2013
- "Beautiful Life" (Nick Fradiani song), 2015
- "Beautiful Life" (Lost Frequencies song), 2016, featuring Sandro Cavazza
- "Beautiful Life" (Rick Astley song), 2018
- "Beautiful Life" (Union J song), 2013
- Beautiful Life, a 2021 song by Cobra Starship
- "Beautiful Life", a track from the 2007 album Chromophobia by Gui Boratto
- "Beautiful Life", a song by James Morrison from his 2011 album The Awakening
- "Beautiful Life", a song by José Galisteo
- "Beautiful Life", a song by Bebe Rexha from the Abominable soundtrack
- "Beautiful Life", a track by the band Switchfoot from their 2026 album Forever Now

== Other ==
- Beautiful Life (Japanese TV series), a 2000 series starring Takuya Kimura
- Beautiful Life (Chinese TV series), a 2007 series starring Yao Qiangyu
- The Beautiful Life, a 2009 American drama series
- Beautiful Life Television, a Buddhist-based television station in Taiwan

== See also ==
- A Beautiful Life (disambiguation)
- Bella Vita (disambiguation), "Beautiful Life" in Italian
- Belle vie (disambiguation), "Beautiful Life" in French
- 美麗人生 (disambiguation), "Beautiful Life" in Chinese
- It's a Beautiful Life (disambiguation)
- Life Is Beautiful (disambiguation)
- Wonderful Life (disambiguation)
