= List of minor planets: 440001–441000 =

The following is a partial list of minor planets, running from minor-planet number 440001 through 441000, inclusive. The primary data for this and other partial lists is based on JPL's "Small-Body Orbital Elements" and data available from the Minor Planet Center. Critical list information is also provided by the MPC, unless otherwise specified from Lowell Observatory. A detailed description of the table's columns and additional sources are given on the main page including a complete list of every page in this series, and a statistical break-up on the dynamical classification of minor planets.

Also see the summary list of all named bodies in numerical and alphabetical order, and the corresponding naming citations for the number range of this particular list. New namings may only be added to this list after official publication, as the preannouncement of names is condemned by the Working Group for Small Bodies Nomenclature of the International Astronomical Union.

Near-Earth obj.	MBA (inner)	MBA (outer)	Centaur
Mars-crosser	MBA (middle)	Jupiter trojan	Trans-Neptunian obj.
Unclassified

== 440001–440100 ==
Designation			Discovery			Properties		Ref
Permanent	Provisional	Named after	Date	Site	Discoverer(s)	Category	Diam.	Ref
440001	2002 CS_{149}	—	February 10, 2002	Socorro	LINEAR	·	1.2 km	MPC · JPL
440002	2002 CJ_{191}	—	February 10, 2002	Socorro	LINEAR	·	860 m	MPC · JPL
440003	2002 DE_{15}	—	February 16, 2002	Palomar	NEAT	EOS	2.1 km	MPC · JPL
440004	2002 EQ_{53}	—	March 13, 2002	Socorro	LINEAR	·	3.8 km	MPC · JPL
440005	2002 ER_{62}	—	February 20, 2002	Kitt Peak	Spacewatch	·	2.6 km	MPC · JPL
440006	2002 EU_{113}	—	March 10, 2002	Kitt Peak	Spacewatch	·	1.1 km	MPC · JPL
440007	2002 GS_{174}	—	April 11, 2002	Socorro	LINEAR	·	1.2 km	MPC · JPL
440008	2002 HT_{10}	—	April 22, 2002	Palomar	NEAT	·	1.3 km	MPC · JPL
440009	2002 JP_{2}	—	May 4, 2002	Socorro	LINEAR	·	1.6 km	MPC · JPL
440010	2002 JZ_{144}	—	May 13, 2002	Palomar	NEAT	·	1.2 km	MPC · JPL
440011	2002 KL_{16}	—	May 18, 2002	Palomar	NEAT	·	2.4 km	MPC · JPL
440012	2002 LE_{27}	—	June 8, 2002	Socorro	LINEAR	AMO	430 m	MPC · JPL
440013	2002 LF_{36}	—	June 9, 2002	Socorro	LINEAR	JUN	1.1 km	MPC · JPL
440014	2002 LE_{48}	—	June 12, 2002	Palomar	NEAT	·	2.2 km	MPC · JPL
440015	2002 MK_{6}	—	June 22, 2002	Palomar	NEAT	(1547)	1.3 km	MPC · JPL
440016	2002 NR_{1}	—	July 5, 2002	Kitt Peak	Spacewatch	·	1.7 km	MPC · JPL
440017	2002 NP_{7}	—	July 9, 2002	Socorro	LINEAR	·	1.3 km	MPC · JPL
440018	2002 NP_{58}	—	July 3, 2002	Palomar	NEAT	·	1.2 km	MPC · JPL
440019	2002 NG_{69}	—	July 12, 2002	Palomar	NEAT	·	630 m	MPC · JPL
440020	2002 NO_{73}	—	July 6, 2002	Palomar	NEAT	·	430 m	MPC · JPL
440021	2002 OL_{12}	—	July 25, 2002	Palomar	NEAT	·	2.7 km	MPC · JPL
440022	2002 OZ_{16}	—	July 18, 2002	Socorro	LINEAR	·	1.4 km	MPC · JPL
440023	2002 OZ_{17}	—	July 9, 2002	Socorro	LINEAR	·	1.5 km	MPC · JPL
440024	2002 OS_{25}	—	July 21, 2002	Palomar	NEAT	·	650 m	MPC · JPL
440025	2002 OF_{27}	—	July 29, 2002	Palomar	NEAT	·	460 m	MPC · JPL
440026	2002 PP_{1}	—	August 4, 2002	Palomar	NEAT	·	1.7 km	MPC · JPL
440027	2002 PP_{7}	—	August 6, 2002	Palomar	NEAT	·	1.4 km	MPC · JPL
440028	2002 PG_{19}	—	August 6, 2002	Palomar	NEAT	·	950 m	MPC · JPL
440029	2002 PT_{25}	—	August 6, 2002	Palomar	NEAT	·	1.6 km	MPC · JPL
440030	2002 PB_{43}	—	August 11, 2002	Needville	J. Dellinger, W. G. Dillon	·	1.7 km	MPC · JPL
440031	2002 PM_{93}	—	August 14, 2002	Palomar	NEAT	·	3.1 km	MPC · JPL
440032	2002 PO_{108}	—	August 13, 2002	Socorro	LINEAR	·	760 m	MPC · JPL
440033	2002 PZ_{121}	—	August 13, 2002	Anderson Mesa	LONEOS	(1547)	1.9 km	MPC · JPL
440034	2002 PW_{122}	—	August 15, 2002	Palomar	NEAT	·	1.5 km	MPC · JPL
440035	2002 PV_{139}	—	August 13, 2002	Socorro	LINEAR	·	1.8 km	MPC · JPL
440036	2002 PX_{141}	—	August 12, 2002	Socorro	LINEAR	·	2.7 km	MPC · JPL
440037	2002 PF_{142}	—	August 11, 2002	Socorro	LINEAR	·	1.9 km	MPC · JPL
440038	2002 PX_{151}	—	August 10, 2002	Cerro Tololo	M. W. Buie	·	1.6 km	MPC · JPL
440039	2002 PL_{158}	—	August 8, 2002	Palomar	S. F. Hönig	·	1.5 km	MPC · JPL
440040	2002 PX_{183}	—	August 7, 2002	Palomar	NEAT	·	1.3 km	MPC · JPL
440041	2002 QN_{15}	—	August 17, 2002	Palomar	NEAT	·	1.9 km	MPC · JPL
440042	2002 QW_{18}	—	August 26, 2002	Palomar	NEAT	·	1.6 km	MPC · JPL
440043	2002 QF_{24}	—	August 29, 2002	Palomar	NEAT	·	1.0 km	MPC · JPL
440044	2002 QM_{56}	—	August 29, 2002	Palomar	S. F. Hönig	·	1.3 km	MPC · JPL
440045	2002 QR_{69}	—	August 31, 2002	Palomar	NEAT	H	440 m	MPC · JPL
440046	2002 QY_{78}	—	August 29, 2002	Palomar	NEAT	·	580 m	MPC · JPL
440047	2002 QZ_{80}	—	August 19, 2002	Palomar	NEAT	·	1.6 km	MPC · JPL
440048	2002 QX_{107}	—	August 27, 2002	Palomar	NEAT	·	2.5 km	MPC · JPL
440049	2002 QH_{112}	—	August 17, 2002	Palomar	NEAT	(1547)	1.4 km	MPC · JPL
440050	2002 QU_{113}	—	August 27, 2002	Palomar	NEAT	ADE	1.6 km	MPC · JPL
440051	2002 QZ_{119}	—	August 30, 2002	Palomar	NEAT	·	510 m	MPC · JPL
440052	2002 QL_{139}	—	August 29, 2002	Palomar	NEAT	·	1.4 km	MPC · JPL
440053	2002 QL_{140}	—	August 19, 2002	Palomar	NEAT	·	1.6 km	MPC · JPL
440054	2002 RY_{16}	—	September 4, 2002	Anderson Mesa	LONEOS	·	1.4 km	MPC · JPL
440055	2002 RE_{34}	—	September 4, 2002	Anderson Mesa	LONEOS	·	2.1 km	MPC · JPL
440056	2002 RM_{57}	—	September 5, 2002	Anderson Mesa	LONEOS	·	2.0 km	MPC · JPL
440057	2002 RL_{70}	—	September 4, 2002	Palomar	NEAT	·	1.9 km	MPC · JPL
440058	2002 RM_{70}	—	August 11, 2002	Socorro	LINEAR	·	1.6 km	MPC · JPL
440059	2002 RX_{99}	—	September 5, 2002	Socorro	LINEAR	·	1.7 km	MPC · JPL
440060	2002 RH_{103}	—	September 5, 2002	Socorro	LINEAR	·	700 m	MPC · JPL
440061	2002 RB_{111}	—	September 6, 2002	Socorro	LINEAR	·	1.8 km	MPC · JPL
440062	2002 RO_{112}	—	September 6, 2002	Socorro	LINEAR	H	470 m	MPC · JPL
440063	2002 RQ_{116}	—	September 7, 2002	Socorro	LINEAR	·	1.9 km	MPC · JPL
440064	2002 RW_{184}	—	September 12, 2002	Palomar	NEAT	·	730 m	MPC · JPL
440065	2002 RC_{191}	—	September 14, 2002	Haleakala	NEAT	·	2.0 km	MPC · JPL
440066	2002 RK_{239}	—	September 14, 2002	Palomar	R. Matson	H	510 m	MPC · JPL
440067	2002 RP_{241}	—	September 8, 2002	Haleakala	R. Matson	EUN	1.9 km	MPC · JPL
440068	2002 RS_{250}	—	September 3, 2002	Haleakala	NEAT	·	1.5 km	MPC · JPL
440069	2002 RY_{260}	—	September 10, 2002	Palomar	NEAT	·	2.0 km	MPC · JPL
440070	2002 RB_{279}	—	September 4, 2002	Palomar	NEAT	·	680 m	MPC · JPL
440071	2002 SV_{1}	—	September 5, 2002	Socorro	LINEAR	·	590 m	MPC · JPL
440072	2002 SG_{14}	—	September 27, 2002	Palomar	NEAT	·	1.3 km	MPC · JPL
440073	2002 SG_{17}	—	September 26, 2002	Palomar	NEAT	(1547)	1.7 km	MPC · JPL
440074	2002 SZ_{19}	—	September 6, 2002	Socorro	LINEAR	·	450 m	MPC · JPL
440075	2002 SV_{24}	—	September 28, 2002	Palomar	NEAT	·	1.8 km	MPC · JPL
440076	2002 SX_{67}	—	September 26, 2002	Palomar	NEAT	·	600 m	MPC · JPL
440077	2002 SL_{69}	—	September 17, 2002	Palomar	NEAT	·	1.3 km	MPC · JPL
440078	2002 TP_{18}	—	October 2, 2002	Socorro	LINEAR	·	2.0 km	MPC · JPL
440079	2002 TK_{22}	—	October 2, 2002	Socorro	LINEAR	·	1.5 km	MPC · JPL
440080	2002 TC_{61}	—	October 3, 2002	Campo Imperatore	CINEOS	·	1.7 km	MPC · JPL
440081	2002 TA_{68}	—	October 6, 2002	Socorro	LINEAR	H	660 m	MPC · JPL
440082	2002 TL_{99}	—	October 4, 2002	Palomar	NEAT	·	2.6 km	MPC · JPL
440083	2002 TL_{156}	—	August 16, 2002	Socorro	LINEAR	EUN	1.3 km	MPC · JPL
440084	2002 TE_{167}	—	October 3, 2002	Palomar	NEAT	JUN	850 m	MPC · JPL
440085	2002 TM_{174}	—	September 7, 2002	Socorro	LINEAR	·	2.4 km	MPC · JPL
440086	2002 TK_{189}	—	September 5, 2002	Anderson Mesa	LONEOS	·	660 m	MPC · JPL
440087	2002 TT_{203}	—	October 4, 2002	Socorro	LINEAR	·	1.3 km	MPC · JPL
440088	2002 TG_{223}	—	October 7, 2002	Socorro	LINEAR	·	1.5 km	MPC · JPL
440089	2002 TO_{232}	—	October 6, 2002	Socorro	LINEAR	·	2.8 km	MPC · JPL
440090	2002 TP_{285}	—	October 10, 2002	Socorro	LINEAR	·	2.0 km	MPC · JPL
440091	2002 TC_{319}	—	October 5, 2002	Apache Point	SDSS	·	1.4 km	MPC · JPL
440092	2002 TH_{350}	—	October 10, 2002	Apache Point	SDSS	EUN	1.1 km	MPC · JPL
440093	2002 TE_{353}	—	October 10, 2002	Apache Point	SDSS	CYB	3.4 km	MPC · JPL
440094	2002 UR_{51}	—	October 29, 2002	Apache Point	SDSS	·	2.0 km	MPC · JPL
440095	2002 VC_{46}	—	November 5, 2002	Socorro	LINEAR	·	1.7 km	MPC · JPL
440096	2002 WK_{5}	—	November 5, 2002	Socorro	LINEAR	·	700 m	MPC · JPL
440097	2002 XW	—	November 14, 2002	Socorro	LINEAR	·	1.9 km	MPC · JPL
440098	2002 XC_{50}	—	December 10, 2002	Palomar	NEAT	·	2.6 km	MPC · JPL
440099	2002 XO_{69}	—	December 5, 2002	Socorro	LINEAR	·	1.8 km	MPC · JPL
440100	2002 XP_{120}	—	December 3, 2002	Palomar	NEAT	·	620 m	MPC · JPL

== 440101–440200 ==
back to top

Designation			Discovery			Properties		Ref
Permanent	Provisional	Named after	Date	Site	Discoverer(s)	Category	Diam.	Ref
440101	2003 AJ_{17}	—	January 5, 2003	Socorro	LINEAR	PHO	1.1 km	MPC · JPL
440102	2003 AK_{23}	—	January 7, 2003	Socorro	LINEAR	H	740 m	MPC · JPL
440103	2003 AP_{67}	—	January 8, 2003	Socorro	LINEAR	·	1.8 km	MPC · JPL
440104	2003 BL_{11}	—	January 26, 2003	Anderson Mesa	LONEOS	·	2.6 km	MPC · JPL
440105	2003 BY_{37}	—	January 27, 2003	Socorro	LINEAR	H	620 m	MPC · JPL
440106	2003 GJ_{37}	—	April 6, 2003	Kitt Peak	Spacewatch	·	1.1 km	MPC · JPL
440107	2003 HC_{14}	—	April 26, 2003	Campo Imperatore	CINEOS	·	1.5 km	MPC · JPL
440108	2003 KG_{1}	—	May 22, 2003	Kitt Peak	Spacewatch	·	3.4 km	MPC · JPL
440109	2003 KR_{5}	—	April 30, 2003	Kitt Peak	Spacewatch	LIX	3.2 km	MPC · JPL
440110	2003 QT_{13}	—	August 22, 2003	Campo Imperatore	CINEOS	·	1.0 km	MPC · JPL
440111	2003 RK_{27}	—	September 5, 2003	Bergisch Gladbach	W. Bickel	·	960 m	MPC · JPL
440112	2003 SL_{24}	—	September 17, 2003	Palomar	NEAT	·	850 m	MPC · JPL
440113	2003 SK_{46}	—	September 16, 2003	Anderson Mesa	LONEOS	·	1.4 km	MPC · JPL
440114	2003 SV_{54}	—	September 16, 2003	Anderson Mesa	LONEOS	·	850 m	MPC · JPL
440115	2003 SH_{58}	—	August 21, 2003	Campo Imperatore	CINEOS	·	1.9 km	MPC · JPL
440116	2003 SZ_{75}	—	September 18, 2003	Kitt Peak	Spacewatch	·	1.1 km	MPC · JPL
440117	2003 SP_{78}	—	September 19, 2003	Kitt Peak	Spacewatch	·	1.5 km	MPC · JPL
440118	2003 SX_{82}	—	September 18, 2003	Kitt Peak	Spacewatch	·	1.1 km	MPC · JPL
440119	2003 SC_{107}	—	September 20, 2003	Palomar	NEAT	·	790 m	MPC · JPL
440120	2003 SX_{108}	—	September 20, 2003	Palomar	NEAT	·	1.2 km	MPC · JPL
440121	2003 SD_{133}	—	September 20, 2003	Palomar	NEAT	·	1.2 km	MPC · JPL
440122	2003 SX_{156}	—	September 19, 2003	Anderson Mesa	LONEOS	·	1.0 km	MPC · JPL
440123	2003 SF_{183}	—	September 21, 2003	Kitt Peak	Spacewatch	(5)	890 m	MPC · JPL
440124	2003 SH_{224}	—	September 25, 2003	Bergisch Gladbach	W. Bickel	·	760 m	MPC · JPL
440125	2003 SE_{254}	—	September 27, 2003	Kitt Peak	Spacewatch	CYB	4.4 km	MPC · JPL
440126	2003 SV_{274}	—	September 28, 2003	Kitt Peak	Spacewatch	·	870 m	MPC · JPL
440127	2003 SG_{281}	—	September 18, 2003	Campo Imperatore	CINEOS	·	1.1 km	MPC · JPL
440128	2003 SX_{297}	—	September 18, 2003	Haleakala	NEAT	EUN	1.2 km	MPC · JPL
440129	2003 SN_{302}	—	September 17, 2003	Palomar	NEAT	EUN	1.4 km	MPC · JPL
440130	2003 SE_{327}	—	September 18, 2003	Kitt Peak	Spacewatch	·	1.1 km	MPC · JPL
440131	2003 SR_{329}	—	September 22, 2003	Kitt Peak	Spacewatch	·	820 m	MPC · JPL
440132	2003 SS_{332}	—	September 29, 2003	Apache Point	SDSS	·	770 m	MPC · JPL
440133	2003 SC_{420}	—	September 28, 2003	Apache Point	SDSS	·	1.4 km	MPC · JPL
440134	2003 TG_{9}	—	October 4, 2003	Kitt Peak	Spacewatch	ADE	2.0 km	MPC · JPL
440135	2003 UJ	—	October 16, 2003	Palomar	NEAT	·	840 m	MPC · JPL
440136	2003 UH_{10}	—	October 18, 2003	Kitt Peak	Spacewatch	·	920 m	MPC · JPL
440137	2003 UG_{33}	—	October 17, 2003	Kitt Peak	Spacewatch	·	720 m	MPC · JPL
440138	2003 UR_{60}	—	October 16, 2003	Palomar	NEAT	(5)	1.0 km	MPC · JPL
440139	2003 UD_{79}	—	October 19, 2003	Palomar	NEAT	·	960 m	MPC · JPL
440140	2003 UQ_{117}	—	September 28, 2003	Anderson Mesa	LONEOS	·	1.3 km	MPC · JPL
440141	2003 UE_{122}	—	September 22, 2003	Socorro	LINEAR	·	850 m	MPC · JPL
440142	2003 UE_{125}	—	October 20, 2003	Socorro	LINEAR	·	1.0 km	MPC · JPL
440143	2003 UN_{154}	—	October 20, 2003	Kitt Peak	Spacewatch	·	1.1 km	MPC · JPL
440144	2003 UT_{155}	—	October 20, 2003	Kitt Peak	Spacewatch	·	1.2 km	MPC · JPL
440145	2003 UV_{177}	—	October 21, 2003	Palomar	NEAT	·	690 m	MPC · JPL
440146	2003 UP_{178}	—	October 21, 2003	Palomar	NEAT	·	840 m	MPC · JPL
440147	2003 UB_{180}	—	October 21, 2003	Socorro	LINEAR	·	940 m	MPC · JPL
440148	2003 UH_{211}	—	October 23, 2003	Kitt Peak	Spacewatch	·	1.2 km	MPC · JPL
440149	2003 UE_{261}	—	October 26, 2003	Kitt Peak	Spacewatch	EUN	1.1 km	MPC · JPL
440150	2003 UK_{268}	—	October 28, 2003	Socorro	LINEAR	·	800 m	MPC · JPL
440151	2003 UK_{305}	—	October 18, 2003	Kitt Peak	Spacewatch	·	1.3 km	MPC · JPL
440152	2003 UG_{316}	—	October 23, 2003	Kitt Peak	Spacewatch	·	900 m	MPC · JPL
440153	2003 UC_{332}	—	September 18, 2003	Kitt Peak	Spacewatch	·	890 m	MPC · JPL
440154	2003 UC_{338}	—	October 18, 2003	Kitt Peak	Spacewatch	·	870 m	MPC · JPL
440155	2003 VJ_{4}	—	November 14, 2003	Palomar	NEAT	(5)	1.0 km	MPC · JPL
440156	2003 VM_{4}	—	October 27, 2003	Kitt Peak	Spacewatch	·	690 m	MPC · JPL
440157	2003 WM_{26}	—	November 20, 2003	Socorro	LINEAR	·	2.1 km	MPC · JPL
440158	2003 WH_{28}	—	November 16, 2003	Kitt Peak	Spacewatch	·	890 m	MPC · JPL
440159	2003 WW_{32}	—	November 18, 2003	Palomar	NEAT	·	1.1 km	MPC · JPL
440160	2003 WE_{33}	—	November 18, 2003	Palomar	NEAT	·	1.1 km	MPC · JPL
440161	2003 WA_{39}	—	October 25, 2003	Kitt Peak	Spacewatch	EUN	1.1 km	MPC · JPL
440162	2003 WH_{56}	—	November 20, 2003	Socorro	LINEAR	·	2.5 km	MPC · JPL
440163	2003 WR_{66}	—	November 19, 2003	Kitt Peak	Spacewatch	·	2.1 km	MPC · JPL
440164	2003 WV_{67}	—	November 19, 2003	Kitt Peak	Spacewatch	·	1 km	MPC · JPL
440165	2003 WU_{108}	—	November 20, 2003	Socorro	LINEAR	·	950 m	MPC · JPL
440166	2003 WG_{114}	—	November 20, 2003	Socorro	LINEAR	·	1.0 km	MPC · JPL
440167	2003 WP_{122}	—	November 20, 2003	Socorro	LINEAR	·	1.0 km	MPC · JPL
440168	2003 WD_{143}	—	November 24, 2003	Socorro	LINEAR	·	1.6 km	MPC · JPL
440169	2003 WL_{186}	—	November 23, 2003	Kitt Peak	M. W. Buie	·	1.0 km	MPC · JPL
440170	2003 XW_{3}	—	December 1, 2003	Socorro	LINEAR	·	1.3 km	MPC · JPL
440171	2003 YQ_{63}	—	December 19, 2003	Socorro	LINEAR	·	1.5 km	MPC · JPL
440172	2003 YN_{89}	—	December 19, 2003	Socorro	LINEAR	·	1.5 km	MPC · JPL
440173	2003 YB_{133}	—	December 28, 2003	Socorro	LINEAR	·	2.6 km	MPC · JPL
440174	2003 YF_{136}	—	December 27, 2003	Kitt Peak	Spacewatch	·	640 m	MPC · JPL
440175	2003 YH_{145}	—	December 28, 2003	Socorro	LINEAR	·	1.6 km	MPC · JPL
440176	2003 YB_{163}	—	December 17, 2003	Socorro	LINEAR	·	1.2 km	MPC · JPL
440177	2004 BM_{8}	—	January 17, 2004	Kitt Peak	Spacewatch	·	1.8 km	MPC · JPL
440178	2004 BZ_{33}	—	January 19, 2004	Kitt Peak	Spacewatch	·	1.2 km	MPC · JPL
440179	2004 BF_{41}	—	January 22, 2004	Socorro	LINEAR	·	1.7 km	MPC · JPL
440180	2004 BY_{64}	—	January 22, 2004	Socorro	LINEAR	·	1.3 km	MPC · JPL
440181	2004 BM_{113}	—	January 28, 2004	Socorro	LINEAR	PHO	1.0 km	MPC · JPL
440182	2004 CR_{6}	—	February 11, 2004	Kitt Peak	Spacewatch	H	570 m	MPC · JPL
440183	2004 CU_{37}	—	February 13, 2004	Desert Eagle	W. K. Y. Yeung	·	2.5 km	MPC · JPL
440184	2004 CZ_{85}	—	February 14, 2004	Kitt Peak	Spacewatch	·	1.9 km	MPC · JPL
440185	2004 CP_{87}	—	February 11, 2004	Kitt Peak	Spacewatch	·	1.6 km	MPC · JPL
440186	2004 CE_{93}	—	January 30, 2004	Socorro	LINEAR	·	2.1 km	MPC · JPL
440187	2004 CD_{103}	—	January 30, 2004	Anderson Mesa	LONEOS	BRA	1.9 km	MPC · JPL
440188	2004 CL_{107}	—	February 14, 2004	Kitt Peak	Spacewatch	DOR	2.3 km	MPC · JPL
440189	2004 DA_{72}	—	February 16, 2004	Kitt Peak	Spacewatch	GEF	1.2 km	MPC · JPL
440190	2004 EH_{38}	—	March 14, 2004	Catalina	CSS	·	2.3 km	MPC · JPL
440191	2004 FP	—	March 16, 2004	Socorro	LINEAR	H	500 m	MPC · JPL
440192	2004 FV_{5}	—	March 20, 2004	Socorro	LINEAR	H	630 m	MPC · JPL
440193	2004 FW_{28}	—	February 18, 2004	Socorro	LINEAR	H	640 m	MPC · JPL
440194	2004 FW_{43}	—	March 16, 2004	Socorro	LINEAR	·	2.5 km	MPC · JPL
440195	2004 FL_{110}	—	March 25, 2004	Socorro	LINEAR	·	1.1 km	MPC · JPL
440196	2004 FK_{158}	—	March 17, 2004	Kitt Peak	Spacewatch	3:2	5.7 km	MPC · JPL
440197	2004 GX	—	March 29, 2004	Kitt Peak	Spacewatch	·	640 m	MPC · JPL
440198	2004 GS_{2}	—	April 12, 2004	Socorro	LINEAR	H	620 m	MPC · JPL
440199	2004 GP_{39}	—	April 15, 2004	Siding Spring	SSS	·	2.7 km	MPC · JPL
440200	2004 HV_{35}	—	March 23, 2004	Socorro	LINEAR	·	850 m	MPC · JPL

== 440201–440300 ==
back to top

Designation			Discovery			Properties		Ref
Permanent	Provisional	Named after	Date	Site	Discoverer(s)	Category	Diam.	Ref
440201	2004 HM_{41}	—	April 19, 2004	Kitt Peak	Spacewatch	·	1.1 km	MPC · JPL
440202	2004 HN_{63}	—	March 29, 2004	Siding Spring	SSS	H	660 m	MPC · JPL
440203	2004 HH_{64}	—	March 28, 2004	Catalina	CSS	·	2.0 km	MPC · JPL
440204	2004 JA_{31}	—	May 15, 2004	Socorro	LINEAR	·	1.5 km	MPC · JPL
440205	2004 LL_{30}	—	June 13, 2004	Kitt Peak	Spacewatch	·	1.2 km	MPC · JPL
440206	2004 NX_{9}	—	July 9, 2004	Socorro	LINEAR	·	1.3 km	MPC · JPL
440207	2004 NY_{12}	—	July 11, 2004	Socorro	LINEAR	·	1.9 km	MPC · JPL
440208	2004 NQ_{17}	—	July 11, 2004	Socorro	LINEAR	·	3.1 km	MPC · JPL
440209	2004 NV_{22}	—	July 11, 2004	Socorro	LINEAR	·	1.2 km	MPC · JPL
440210	2004 ND_{31}	—	July 10, 2004	Catalina	CSS	·	4.8 km	MPC · JPL
440211	2004 NZ_{32}	—	July 15, 2004	Siding Spring	SSS	PHO	1.1 km	MPC · JPL
440212	2004 OB	—	July 16, 2004	Socorro	LINEAR	APO · PHA	570 m	MPC · JPL
440213	2004 OD_{6}	—	July 18, 2004	Reedy Creek	J. Broughton	ERI	1.6 km	MPC · JPL
440214	2004 OJ_{10}	—	July 21, 2004	Reedy Creek	J. Broughton	·	4.7 km	MPC · JPL
440215	2004 PY_{4}	—	August 6, 2004	Palomar	NEAT	·	1.1 km	MPC · JPL
440216	2004 PQ_{6}	—	August 6, 2004	Palomar	NEAT	V	830 m	MPC · JPL
440217	2004 PT_{10}	—	August 7, 2004	Palomar	NEAT	PHO	750 m	MPC · JPL
440218	2004 PR_{21}	—	August 8, 2004	Palomar	NEAT	·	2.1 km	MPC · JPL
440219	2004 PY_{34}	—	August 8, 2004	Anderson Mesa	LONEOS	NYS	1.1 km	MPC · JPL
440220	2004 PO_{38}	—	August 9, 2004	Socorro	LINEAR	·	1.1 km	MPC · JPL
440221	2004 PQ_{48}	—	August 8, 2004	Socorro	LINEAR	·	1.3 km	MPC · JPL
440222	2004 PC_{56}	—	August 8, 2004	Anderson Mesa	LONEOS	·	2.9 km	MPC · JPL
440223	2004 PW_{57}	—	August 9, 2004	Socorro	LINEAR	H	530 m	MPC · JPL
440224	2004 PE_{65}	—	August 10, 2004	Socorro	LINEAR	·	940 m	MPC · JPL
440225	2004 PK_{65}	—	August 10, 2004	Socorro	LINEAR	·	3.4 km	MPC · JPL
440226	2004 PN_{66}	—	August 10, 2004	Campo Imperatore	CINEOS	·	2.9 km	MPC · JPL
440227	2004 PJ_{74}	—	August 8, 2004	Socorro	LINEAR	NYS	1.1 km	MPC · JPL
440228	2004 PU_{82}	—	July 27, 2004	Socorro	LINEAR	·	2.9 km	MPC · JPL
440229	2004 PE_{104}	—	June 23, 2004	Siding Spring	SSS	·	2.7 km	MPC · JPL
440230	2004 PQ_{111}	—	August 10, 2004	Socorro	LINEAR	·	3.9 km	MPC · JPL
440231	2004 QG_{15}	—	August 22, 2004	Kitt Peak	Spacewatch	·	3.0 km	MPC · JPL
440232	2004 QQ_{15}	—	August 23, 2004	Goodricke-Pigott	Goodricke-Pigott	·	1.1 km	MPC · JPL
440233	2004 QS_{15}	—	August 23, 2004	Kitt Peak	Spacewatch	EOS	2.5 km	MPC · JPL
440234	2004 QE_{19}	—	August 23, 2004	Kitt Peak	Spacewatch	·	1.1 km	MPC · JPL
440235	2004 QR_{19}	—	August 25, 2004	Socorro	LINEAR	·	5.2 km	MPC · JPL
440236	2004 QK_{20}	—	August 25, 2004	Socorro	LINEAR	·	6.3 km	MPC · JPL
440237	2004 QB_{26}	—	August 21, 2004	Catalina	CSS	MAS	820 m	MPC · JPL
440238	2004 QV_{28}	—	August 25, 2004	Kitt Peak	Spacewatch	PHO	780 m	MPC · JPL
440239	2004 RB_{2}	—	September 6, 2004	Socorro	LINEAR	·	6.0 km	MPC · JPL
440240	2004 RF_{2}	—	September 6, 2004	Socorro	LINEAR	·	4.8 km	MPC · JPL
440241	2004 RG_{9}	—	September 7, 2004	Eskridge	Farpoint	·	2.4 km	MPC · JPL
440242	2004 RX_{9}	—	September 7, 2004	Socorro	LINEAR	·	990 m	MPC · JPL
440243	2004 RF_{10}	—	September 7, 2004	Socorro	LINEAR	·	1.5 km	MPC · JPL
440244	2004 RG_{13}	—	September 4, 2004	Palomar	NEAT	NYS	1.1 km	MPC · JPL
440245	2004 RM_{14}	—	September 6, 2004	Siding Spring	SSS	·	1.1 km	MPC · JPL
440246	2004 RY_{14}	—	September 6, 2004	Siding Spring	SSS	·	1.1 km	MPC · JPL
440247	2004 RT_{15}	—	September 7, 2004	Socorro	LINEAR	·	1.2 km	MPC · JPL
440248	2004 RF_{22}	—	September 7, 2004	Kitt Peak	Spacewatch	·	1.1 km	MPC · JPL
440249	2004 RM_{22}	—	September 7, 2004	Kitt Peak	Spacewatch	NYS	1.1 km	MPC · JPL
440250	2004 RN_{22}	—	September 7, 2004	Kitt Peak	Spacewatch	NYS	1.2 km	MPC · JPL
440251	2004 RW_{41}	—	August 19, 2004	Socorro	LINEAR	·	3.6 km	MPC · JPL
440252	2004 RJ_{46}	—	September 8, 2004	Socorro	LINEAR	NYS	1.1 km	MPC · JPL
440253	2004 RR_{64}	—	September 8, 2004	Socorro	LINEAR	EOS	2.2 km	MPC · JPL
440254	2004 RV_{68}	—	September 8, 2004	Socorro	LINEAR	·	1.5 km	MPC · JPL
440255	2004 RD_{71}	—	September 8, 2004	Socorro	LINEAR	·	900 m	MPC · JPL
440256	2004 RR_{80}	—	September 8, 2004	Socorro	LINEAR	·	2.7 km	MPC · JPL
440257	2004 RG_{81}	—	September 8, 2004	Socorro	LINEAR	·	1.2 km	MPC · JPL
440258	2004 RR_{82}	—	September 9, 2004	Socorro	LINEAR	·	1.0 km	MPC · JPL
440259	2004 RB_{88}	—	September 7, 2004	Kitt Peak	Spacewatch	NYS	1.0 km	MPC · JPL
440260	2004 RQ_{91}	—	September 8, 2004	Socorro	LINEAR	·	1.1 km	MPC · JPL
440261	2004 RG_{94}	—	September 8, 2004	Socorro	LINEAR	·	1.2 km	MPC · JPL
440262	2004 RY_{99}	—	September 8, 2004	Socorro	LINEAR	·	1.2 km	MPC · JPL
440263	2004 RO_{100}	—	September 8, 2004	Socorro	LINEAR	·	1.5 km	MPC · JPL
440264	2004 RX_{101}	—	September 8, 2004	Socorro	LINEAR	·	1 km	MPC · JPL
440265	2004 RD_{103}	—	September 8, 2004	Palomar	NEAT	·	5.1 km	MPC · JPL
440266	2004 RR_{107}	—	September 9, 2004	Socorro	LINEAR	·	1.4 km	MPC · JPL
440267	2004 RQ_{112}	—	September 6, 2004	Socorro	LINEAR	·	3.1 km	MPC · JPL
440268	2004 RY_{113}	—	August 20, 2004	Catalina	CSS	TIR	3.7 km	MPC · JPL
440269	2004 RO_{114}	—	September 7, 2004	Kitt Peak	Spacewatch	·	3.0 km	MPC · JPL
440270	2004 RG_{126}	—	September 7, 2004	Kitt Peak	Spacewatch	·	2.5 km	MPC · JPL
440271	2004 RS_{131}	—	September 7, 2004	Kitt Peak	Spacewatch	VER	2.7 km	MPC · JPL
440272	2004 RR_{138}	—	September 8, 2004	Socorro	LINEAR	·	850 m	MPC · JPL
440273	2004 RO_{143}	—	September 8, 2004	Socorro	LINEAR	NYS	1.2 km	MPC · JPL
440274	2004 RQ_{143}	—	September 8, 2004	Socorro	LINEAR	NYS	1.2 km	MPC · JPL
440275	2004 RP_{155}	—	September 10, 2004	Socorro	LINEAR	·	1.1 km	MPC · JPL
440276	2004 RX_{159}	—	September 10, 2004	Socorro	LINEAR	·	1.1 km	MPC · JPL
440277	2004 RF_{164}	—	September 10, 2004	Altschwendt	W. Ries	·	3.4 km	MPC · JPL
440278	2004 RL_{169}	—	September 8, 2004	Socorro	LINEAR	·	930 m	MPC · JPL
440279	2004 RW_{170}	—	August 25, 2004	Kitt Peak	Spacewatch	·	3.2 km	MPC · JPL
440280	2004 RE_{179}	—	September 10, 2004	Socorro	LINEAR	·	4.3 km	MPC · JPL
440281	2004 RZ_{186}	—	September 10, 2004	Socorro	LINEAR	·	3.5 km	MPC · JPL
440282	2004 RB_{188}	—	September 10, 2004	Socorro	LINEAR	·	1.4 km	MPC · JPL
440283	2004 RY_{203}	—	September 12, 2004	Kitt Peak	Spacewatch	·	1.3 km	MPC · JPL
440284	2004 RR_{204}	—	September 12, 2004	Kitt Peak	Spacewatch	·	1.4 km	MPC · JPL
440285	2004 RQ_{213}	—	September 11, 2004	Socorro	LINEAR	·	3.5 km	MPC · JPL
440286	2004 RF_{214}	—	September 11, 2004	Socorro	LINEAR	·	3.2 km	MPC · JPL
440287	2004 RY_{216}	—	September 11, 2004	Socorro	LINEAR	·	3.2 km	MPC · JPL
440288	2004 RJ_{217}	—	September 11, 2004	Socorro	LINEAR	·	2.4 km	MPC · JPL
440289	2004 RY_{217}	—	September 11, 2004	Socorro	LINEAR	·	1.8 km	MPC · JPL
440290	2004 RS_{220}	—	September 11, 2004	Socorro	LINEAR	·	3.5 km	MPC · JPL
440291	2004 RR_{224}	—	September 9, 2004	Ottmarsheim	Ottmarsheim	·	1.4 km	MPC · JPL
440292	2004 RY_{224}	—	September 9, 2004	Socorro	LINEAR	·	2.7 km	MPC · JPL
440293	2004 RV_{227}	—	September 9, 2004	Kitt Peak	Spacewatch	·	1.2 km	MPC · JPL
440294	2004 RB_{232}	—	September 9, 2004	Kitt Peak	Spacewatch	V	620 m	MPC · JPL
440295	2004 RL_{235}	—	September 10, 2004	Socorro	LINEAR	·	3.1 km	MPC · JPL
440296	2004 RP_{235}	—	September 10, 2004	Kitt Peak	Spacewatch	·	840 m	MPC · JPL
440297	2004 RN_{247}	—	September 12, 2004	Socorro	LINEAR	·	4.0 km	MPC · JPL
440298	2004 RA_{258}	—	August 11, 2004	Socorro	LINEAR	·	3.2 km	MPC · JPL
440299	2004 RA_{270}	—	September 11, 2004	Kitt Peak	Spacewatch	·	2.5 km	MPC · JPL
440300	2004 RX_{272}	—	September 11, 2004	Kitt Peak	Spacewatch	·	970 m	MPC · JPL

== 440301–440400 ==
back to top

Designation			Discovery			Properties		Ref
Permanent	Provisional	Named after	Date	Site	Discoverer(s)	Category	Diam.	Ref
440301	2004 RP_{280}	—	September 15, 2004	Kitt Peak	Spacewatch	NYS	1.0 km	MPC · JPL
440302	2004 RY_{285}	—	September 15, 2004	Kitt Peak	Spacewatch	·	940 m	MPC · JPL
440303	2004 RX_{307}	—	September 13, 2004	Socorro	LINEAR	·	1.3 km	MPC · JPL
440304	2004 RN_{318}	—	September 12, 2004	Kitt Peak	Spacewatch	·	2.3 km	MPC · JPL
440305	2004 RO_{320}	—	September 13, 2004	Socorro	LINEAR	·	1.2 km	MPC · JPL
440306	2004 RM_{326}	—	September 13, 2004	Palomar	NEAT	V	690 m	MPC · JPL
440307	2004 RB_{328}	—	September 15, 2004	Anderson Mesa	LONEOS	·	2.8 km	MPC · JPL
440308	2004 RU_{337}	—	September 15, 2004	Kitt Peak	Spacewatch	NYS	910 m	MPC · JPL
440309	2004 SC_{3}	—	September 6, 2004	Siding Spring	SSS	·	2.3 km	MPC · JPL
440310	2004 SR_{3}	—	September 17, 2004	Socorro	LINEAR	·	4.6 km	MPC · JPL
440311	2004 SO_{34}	—	September 17, 2004	Kitt Peak	Spacewatch	V	620 m	MPC · JPL
440312	2004 SE_{42}	—	September 18, 2004	Socorro	LINEAR	LIX	3.4 km	MPC · JPL
440313	2004 SG_{50}	—	September 22, 2004	Socorro	LINEAR	·	1.2 km	MPC · JPL
440314	2004 ST_{50}	—	September 22, 2004	Kitt Peak	Spacewatch	·	2.8 km	MPC · JPL
440315	2004 SR_{56}	—	September 9, 2004	Socorro	LINEAR	LIX	3.5 km	MPC · JPL
440316	2004 TF_{26}	—	October 4, 2004	Kitt Peak	Spacewatch	·	2.7 km	MPC · JPL
440317	2004 TE_{33}	—	October 4, 2004	Kitt Peak	Spacewatch	NYS	1 km	MPC · JPL
440318	2004 TN_{33}	—	September 15, 2004	Kitt Peak	Spacewatch	·	1.0 km	MPC · JPL
440319	2004 TN_{45}	—	October 4, 2004	Kitt Peak	Spacewatch	·	4.0 km	MPC · JPL
440320	2004 TC_{46}	—	October 4, 2004	Kitt Peak	Spacewatch	MAS	650 m	MPC · JPL
440321	2004 TS_{59}	—	October 5, 2004	Kitt Peak	Spacewatch	·	1.4 km	MPC · JPL
440322	2004 TK_{60}	—	September 9, 2004	Socorro	LINEAR	·	1.1 km	MPC · JPL
440323	2004 TR_{65}	—	September 24, 2004	Tucson	R. A. Tucker	·	3.2 km	MPC · JPL
440324	2004 TH_{90}	—	September 17, 2004	Kitt Peak	Spacewatch	·	1.1 km	MPC · JPL
440325	2004 TV_{96}	—	October 5, 2004	Kitt Peak	Spacewatch	(6769)	1.1 km	MPC · JPL
440326	2004 TS_{103}	—	September 22, 2004	Socorro	LINEAR	·	1.0 km	MPC · JPL
440327	2004 TB_{108}	—	September 17, 2004	Socorro	LINEAR	·	1.2 km	MPC · JPL
440328	2004 TC_{112}	—	October 7, 2004	Palomar	NEAT	·	3.3 km	MPC · JPL
440329	2004 TW_{115}	—	October 15, 2004	Goodricke-Pigott	Goodricke-Pigott	·	1.1 km	MPC · JPL
440330	2004 TP_{118}	—	October 5, 2004	Palomar	NEAT	·	1.9 km	MPC · JPL
440331	2004 TA_{124}	—	October 7, 2004	Socorro	LINEAR	MAS	770 m	MPC · JPL
440332	2004 TX_{124}	—	October 7, 2004	Socorro	LINEAR	·	2.9 km	MPC · JPL
440333	2004 TM_{125}	—	October 7, 2004	Socorro	LINEAR	MAS	750 m	MPC · JPL
440334	2004 TQ_{126}	—	October 7, 2004	Socorro	LINEAR	·	2.1 km	MPC · JPL
440335	2004 TD_{129}	—	September 17, 2004	Socorro	LINEAR	·	1.1 km	MPC · JPL
440336	2004 TR_{162}	—	October 6, 2004	Kitt Peak	Spacewatch	MAS	730 m	MPC · JPL
440337	2004 TW_{181}	—	September 12, 2004	Socorro	LINEAR	·	3.9 km	MPC · JPL
440338	2004 TJ_{187}	—	September 24, 2004	Kitt Peak	Spacewatch	·	2.9 km	MPC · JPL
440339	2004 TL_{196}	—	September 17, 2004	Kitt Peak	Spacewatch	·	1.1 km	MPC · JPL
440340	2004 TM_{197}	—	October 7, 2004	Kitt Peak	Spacewatch	·	1.2 km	MPC · JPL
440341	2004 TJ_{209}	—	October 8, 2004	Kitt Peak	Spacewatch	·	960 m	MPC · JPL
440342	2004 TN_{213}	—	October 9, 2004	Kitt Peak	Spacewatch	·	4.3 km	MPC · JPL
440343	2004 TB_{224}	—	September 18, 2004	Socorro	LINEAR	NYS	1.3 km	MPC · JPL
440344	2004 TG_{226}	—	October 8, 2004	Kitt Peak	Spacewatch	VER	2.7 km	MPC · JPL
440345	2004 TU_{227}	—	October 8, 2004	Kitt Peak	Spacewatch	·	930 m	MPC · JPL
440346	2004 TN_{244}	—	September 10, 2004	Kitt Peak	Spacewatch	·	4.4 km	MPC · JPL
440347	2004 TH_{265}	—	October 9, 2004	Kitt Peak	Spacewatch	NYS	1.1 km	MPC · JPL
440348	2004 TZ_{275}	—	October 9, 2004	Kitt Peak	Spacewatch	·	1.2 km	MPC · JPL
440349	2004 TL_{295}	—	October 10, 2004	Kitt Peak	Spacewatch	·	3.7 km	MPC · JPL
440350	2004 TC_{296}	—	October 10, 2004	Kitt Peak	Spacewatch	·	890 m	MPC · JPL
440351	2004 TE_{297}	—	October 11, 2004	Kitt Peak	Spacewatch	·	1.6 km	MPC · JPL
440352	2004 TC_{298}	—	September 11, 2004	Socorro	LINEAR	·	4.1 km	MPC · JPL
440353	2004 TR_{298}	—	October 13, 2004	Kitt Peak	Spacewatch	·	2.3 km	MPC · JPL
440354	2004 TR_{350}	—	October 10, 2004	Kitt Peak	M. W. Buie	NYS	1.2 km	MPC · JPL
440355	2004 TB_{354}	—	October 11, 2004	Kitt Peak	M. W. Buie	·	900 m	MPC · JPL
440356	2004 TW_{361}	—	October 13, 2004	Kitt Peak	Spacewatch	NYS	1.0 km	MPC · JPL
440357	2004 VO_{2}	—	October 6, 2004	Kitt Peak	Spacewatch	·	2.9 km	MPC · JPL
440358	2004 VY_{10}	—	November 3, 2004	Catalina	CSS	·	4.3 km	MPC · JPL
440359	2004 VC_{77}	—	October 9, 2004	Kitt Peak	Spacewatch	·	3.4 km	MPC · JPL
440360	2004 XC_{18}	—	December 7, 2004	Socorro	LINEAR	·	1.6 km	MPC · JPL
440361	2004 XA_{36}	—	December 9, 2004	Vail-Jarnac	Jarnac	·	3.4 km	MPC · JPL
440362	2004 XX_{39}	—	December 10, 2004	Kitt Peak	Spacewatch	·	1.2 km	MPC · JPL
440363	2004 XU_{51}	—	November 20, 2004	Kitt Peak	Spacewatch	·	5.7 km	MPC · JPL
440364	2004 XR_{57}	—	December 10, 2004	Kitt Peak	Spacewatch	·	1.2 km	MPC · JPL
440365	2004 XP_{58}	—	December 10, 2004	Kitt Peak	Spacewatch	PHO	1.4 km	MPC · JPL
440366	2004 XS_{80}	—	December 10, 2004	Socorro	LINEAR	·	2.7 km	MPC · JPL
440367	2004 XL_{87}	—	December 9, 2004	Catalina	CSS	·	1.9 km	MPC · JPL
440368	2004 XP_{103}	—	December 9, 2004	Catalina	CSS	·	1.3 km	MPC · JPL
440369	2005 AZ_{12}	—	January 7, 2005	Socorro	LINEAR	·	1.1 km	MPC · JPL
440370	2005 AJ_{18}	—	January 6, 2005	Socorro	LINEAR	·	2.3 km	MPC · JPL
440371	2005 AG_{23}	—	January 7, 2005	Socorro	LINEAR	·	1.5 km	MPC · JPL
440372	2005 AJ_{30}	—	January 9, 2005	Catalina	CSS	·	1.7 km	MPC · JPL
440373	2005 AE_{74}	—	January 15, 2005	Kitt Peak	Spacewatch	·	1.2 km	MPC · JPL
440374	2005 BY_{28}	—	January 31, 2005	Palomar	NEAT	·	1.1 km	MPC · JPL
440375	2005 BD_{49}	—	January 16, 2005	Catalina	CSS	·	1.3 km	MPC · JPL
440376	2005 CN_{18}	—	February 2, 2005	Catalina	CSS	·	1.9 km	MPC · JPL
440377	2005 CC_{36}	—	December 18, 2004	Mount Lemmon	Mount Lemmon Survey	·	1.5 km	MPC · JPL
440378	2005 CN_{47}	—	February 2, 2005	Kitt Peak	Spacewatch	·	1.5 km	MPC · JPL
440379	2005 CS_{47}	—	December 20, 2004	Mount Lemmon	Mount Lemmon Survey	MAR	1.1 km	MPC · JPL
440380	2005 CD_{61}	—	February 3, 2005	Calvin-Rehoboth	Calvin College	·	1.7 km	MPC · JPL
440381	2005 EN_{91}	—	March 8, 2005	Kitt Peak	Spacewatch	·	1.8 km	MPC · JPL
440382	2005 ET_{122}	—	February 1, 2005	Kitt Peak	Spacewatch	·	1.3 km	MPC · JPL
440383	2005 EK_{126}	—	March 8, 2005	Mount Lemmon	Mount Lemmon Survey	·	2.0 km	MPC · JPL
440384	2005 EO_{238}	—	March 11, 2005	Kitt Peak	Spacewatch	·	2.1 km	MPC · JPL
440385	2005 ED_{243}	—	March 11, 2005	Kitt Peak	Spacewatch	ADE	2.4 km	MPC · JPL
440386	2005 EP_{251}	—	March 3, 2005	Catalina	CSS	·	1.9 km	MPC · JPL
440387	2005 GO_{36}	—	April 2, 2005	Mount Lemmon	Mount Lemmon Survey	·	660 m	MPC · JPL
440388	2005 GM_{57}	—	April 6, 2005	Mount Lemmon	Mount Lemmon Survey	·	1.7 km	MPC · JPL
440389	2005 GP_{68}	—	April 2, 2005	Catalina	CSS	·	1.9 km	MPC · JPL
440390	2005 GG_{176}	—	April 14, 2005	Kitt Peak	Spacewatch	·	3.0 km	MPC · JPL
440391	2005 GF_{198}	—	April 10, 2005	Kitt Peak	M. W. Buie	·	1.4 km	MPC · JPL
440392	2005 GO_{200}	—	March 16, 2005	Mount Lemmon	Mount Lemmon Survey	·	1.7 km	MPC · JPL
440393	2005 JQ_{20}	—	May 4, 2005	Catalina	CSS	·	2.0 km	MPC · JPL
440394	2005 JN_{32}	—	May 4, 2005	Mount Lemmon	Mount Lemmon Survey	·	1.4 km	MPC · JPL
440395	2005 JH_{120}	—	May 10, 2005	Kitt Peak	Spacewatch	·	1.7 km	MPC · JPL
440396	2005 JO_{156}	—	May 4, 2005	Mount Lemmon	Mount Lemmon Survey	·	2.5 km	MPC · JPL
440397	2005 LU_{20}	—	June 4, 2005	Kitt Peak	Spacewatch	·	1.7 km	MPC · JPL
440398	2005 MN_{14}	—	June 28, 2005	Palomar	NEAT	·	710 m	MPC · JPL
440399	2005 NW_{3}	—	July 2, 2005	Kitt Peak	Spacewatch	·	1.8 km	MPC · JPL
440400	2005 NQ_{19}	—	June 13, 2005	Mount Lemmon	Mount Lemmon Survey	·	630 m	MPC · JPL

== 440401–440500 ==
back to top

Designation			Discovery			Properties		Ref
Permanent	Provisional	Named after	Date	Site	Discoverer(s)	Category	Diam.	Ref
440401	2005 NS_{28}	—	July 5, 2005	Palomar	NEAT	·	670 m	MPC · JPL
440402	2005 NO_{41}	—	July 4, 2005	Mount Lemmon	Mount Lemmon Survey	·	600 m	MPC · JPL
440403	2005 ND_{45}	—	July 4, 2005	Kitt Peak	Spacewatch	·	540 m	MPC · JPL
440404	2005 NT_{64}	—	July 1, 2005	Kitt Peak	Spacewatch	·	450 m	MPC · JPL
440405	2005 NW_{67}	—	July 3, 2005	Mount Lemmon	Mount Lemmon Survey	·	2.1 km	MPC · JPL
440406	2005 OK_{1}	—	July 19, 2005	Palomar	NEAT	·	2.5 km	MPC · JPL
440407	2005 OU_{21}	—	July 29, 2005	Palomar	NEAT	·	720 m	MPC · JPL
440408	2005 PM_{3}	—	August 6, 2005	Pla D'Arguines	D'Arguines, Pla	·	2.2 km	MPC · JPL
440409	2005 QZ_{4}	—	August 25, 2005	Palomar	NEAT	H	560 m	MPC · JPL
440410	2005 QA_{25}	—	August 27, 2005	Kitt Peak	Spacewatch	·	690 m	MPC · JPL
440411 Piovani	2005 QS_{28}	Piovani	August 26, 2005	Vallemare Borbona	V. S. Casulli	·	2.3 km	MPC · JPL
440412	2005 QG_{32}	—	August 24, 2005	Palomar	NEAT	·	1.8 km	MPC · JPL
440413	2005 QD_{34}	—	August 25, 2005	Palomar	NEAT	·	2.3 km	MPC · JPL
440414	2005 QY_{62}	—	August 26, 2005	Palomar	NEAT	·	1.9 km	MPC · JPL
440415	2005 QR_{68}	—	August 28, 2005	Siding Spring	SSS	·	3.5 km	MPC · JPL
440416	2005 QR_{80}	—	June 17, 2005	Mount Lemmon	Mount Lemmon Survey	·	770 m	MPC · JPL
440417	2005 QS_{80}	—	August 28, 2005	Anderson Mesa	LONEOS	·	830 m	MPC · JPL
440418	2005 QL_{83}	—	August 29, 2005	Kitt Peak	Spacewatch	·	620 m	MPC · JPL
440419	2005 QE_{114}	—	August 27, 2005	Palomar	NEAT	·	750 m	MPC · JPL
440420	2005 QW_{129}	—	August 28, 2005	Kitt Peak	Spacewatch	·	2.1 km	MPC · JPL
440421	2005 QT_{170}	—	August 29, 2005	Palomar	NEAT	·	950 m	MPC · JPL
440422	2005 QX_{180}	—	August 29, 2005	Kitt Peak	Spacewatch	·	690 m	MPC · JPL
440423	2005 RB_{15}	—	September 1, 2005	Kitt Peak	Spacewatch	·	2.1 km	MPC · JPL
440424	2005 RM_{22}	—	August 31, 2005	Socorro	LINEAR	·	870 m	MPC · JPL
440425	2005 RG_{33}	—	September 14, 2005	Kitt Peak	Spacewatch	·	800 m	MPC · JPL
440426	2005 RC_{45}	—	September 8, 2005	Bergisch Gladbach	W. Bickel	·	1.8 km	MPC · JPL
440427	2005 RF_{48}	—	September 14, 2005	Apache Point	A. C. Becker	EOS	1.6 km	MPC · JPL
440428	2005 RU_{51}	—	September 1, 2005	Kitt Peak	Spacewatch	·	2.5 km	MPC · JPL
440429	2005 SK_{8}	—	September 25, 2005	Kitt Peak	Spacewatch	·	1.4 km	MPC · JPL
440430	2005 SO_{8}	—	September 25, 2005	Kitt Peak	Spacewatch	(2076)	890 m	MPC · JPL
440431	2005 SF_{21}	—	September 26, 2005	Kitt Peak	Spacewatch	·	2.2 km	MPC · JPL
440432	2005 SR_{21}	—	September 27, 2005	Socorro	LINEAR	·	3.6 km	MPC · JPL
440433	2005 SA_{22}	—	September 23, 2005	Kitt Peak	Spacewatch	·	610 m	MPC · JPL
440434	2005 SL_{22}	—	September 23, 2005	Kitt Peak	Spacewatch	·	2.4 km	MPC · JPL
440435	2005 SZ_{22}	—	September 23, 2005	Kitt Peak	Spacewatch	·	690 m	MPC · JPL
440436	2005 SB_{31}	—	September 23, 2005	Kitt Peak	Spacewatch	·	670 m	MPC · JPL
440437	2005 SM_{32}	—	September 23, 2005	Kitt Peak	Spacewatch	·	1.4 km	MPC · JPL
440438	2005 SS_{38}	—	September 24, 2005	Kitt Peak	Spacewatch	EOS	1.6 km	MPC · JPL
440439	2005 SA_{40}	—	September 24, 2005	Kitt Peak	Spacewatch	·	2.2 km	MPC · JPL
440440	2005 SO_{43}	—	September 24, 2005	Kitt Peak	Spacewatch	·	740 m	MPC · JPL
440441	2005 SJ_{45}	—	September 24, 2005	Kitt Peak	Spacewatch	·	690 m	MPC · JPL
440442	2005 SP_{45}	—	September 24, 2005	Kitt Peak	Spacewatch	EOS	1.8 km	MPC · JPL
440443	2005 SN_{47}	—	September 24, 2005	Kitt Peak	Spacewatch	EOS	1.9 km	MPC · JPL
440444	2005 SU_{48}	—	September 24, 2005	Kitt Peak	Spacewatch	·	1.7 km	MPC · JPL
440445	2005 SG_{59}	—	September 26, 2005	Kitt Peak	Spacewatch	·	2.1 km	MPC · JPL
440446	2005 SS_{74}	—	September 24, 2005	Kitt Peak	Spacewatch	·	2.4 km	MPC · JPL
440447	2005 SD_{75}	—	September 24, 2005	Kitt Peak	Spacewatch	·	630 m	MPC · JPL
440448	2005 SH_{76}	—	September 24, 2005	Kitt Peak	Spacewatch	·	690 m	MPC · JPL
440449	2005 SJ_{76}	—	September 24, 2005	Kitt Peak	Spacewatch	·	1.9 km	MPC · JPL
440450	2005 SE_{88}	—	September 24, 2005	Kitt Peak	Spacewatch	EOS	1.8 km	MPC · JPL
440451	2005 SD_{92}	—	September 24, 2005	Kitt Peak	Spacewatch	EOS	2.0 km	MPC · JPL
440452	2005 SL_{92}	—	September 24, 2005	Kitt Peak	Spacewatch	·	610 m	MPC · JPL
440453	2005 SP_{97}	—	September 25, 2005	Palomar	NEAT	EOS	2.1 km	MPC · JPL
440454	2005 SO_{98}	—	September 25, 2005	Kitt Peak	Spacewatch	·	840 m	MPC · JPL
440455	2005 SZ_{132}	—	September 29, 2005	Kitt Peak	Spacewatch	·	2.5 km	MPC · JPL
440456	2005 SR_{149}	—	September 25, 2005	Kitt Peak	Spacewatch	·	2.6 km	MPC · JPL
440457	2005 SG_{151}	—	September 25, 2005	Kitt Peak	Spacewatch	·	2.3 km	MPC · JPL
440458	2005 SW_{158}	—	September 26, 2005	Kitt Peak	Spacewatch	·	2.8 km	MPC · JPL
440459	2005 SB_{160}	—	September 27, 2005	Kitt Peak	Spacewatch	·	3.1 km	MPC · JPL
440460	2005 ST_{174}	—	September 29, 2005	Kitt Peak	Spacewatch	EOS	1.8 km	MPC · JPL
440461	2005 SY_{175}	—	September 29, 2005	Kitt Peak	Spacewatch	·	670 m	MPC · JPL
440462	2005 SC_{176}	—	September 29, 2005	Kitt Peak	Spacewatch	·	610 m	MPC · JPL
440463	2005 SN_{182}	—	September 29, 2005	Kitt Peak	Spacewatch	BAP	730 m	MPC · JPL
440464	2005 SH_{198}	—	September 30, 2005	Mount Lemmon	Mount Lemmon Survey	EOS	2.0 km	MPC · JPL
440465	2005 ST_{200}	—	September 30, 2005	Kitt Peak	Spacewatch	·	620 m	MPC · JPL
440466	2005 SH_{208}	—	September 30, 2005	Kitt Peak	Spacewatch	·	2.0 km	MPC · JPL
440467	2005 SS_{221}	—	September 30, 2005	Catalina	CSS	·	2.9 km	MPC · JPL
440468	2005 SM_{240}	—	September 30, 2005	Kitt Peak	Spacewatch	·	2.5 km	MPC · JPL
440469	2005 SU_{241}	—	September 30, 2005	Kitt Peak	Spacewatch	·	860 m	MPC · JPL
440470	2005 SF_{242}	—	September 30, 2005	Kitt Peak	Spacewatch	·	2.5 km	MPC · JPL
440471	2005 SA_{243}	—	September 30, 2005	Mount Lemmon	Mount Lemmon Survey	·	670 m	MPC · JPL
440472	2005 SA_{257}	—	September 22, 2005	Palomar	NEAT	·	1.6 km	MPC · JPL
440473	2005 SO_{263}	—	September 23, 2005	Kitt Peak	Spacewatch	·	670 m	MPC · JPL
440474	2005 SU_{263}	—	September 23, 2005	Kitt Peak	Spacewatch	·	730 m	MPC · JPL
440475	2005 SB_{269}	—	September 25, 2005	Kitt Peak	Spacewatch	·	1.4 km	MPC · JPL
440476	2005 SQ_{271}	—	September 30, 2005	Anderson Mesa	LONEOS	·	3.5 km	MPC · JPL
440477	2005 SK_{288}	—	September 27, 2005	Apache Point	A. C. Becker	·	1.9 km	MPC · JPL
440478	2005 ST_{288}	—	September 27, 2005	Apache Point	A. C. Becker	·	2.8 km	MPC · JPL
440479	2005 TX_{6}	—	October 1, 2005	Catalina	CSS	H · fast	510 m	MPC · JPL
440480	2005 TU_{13}	—	October 1, 2005	Goodricke-Pigott	R. A. Tucker	·	1.8 km	MPC · JPL
440481	2005 TX_{13}	—	September 14, 2005	Kitt Peak	Spacewatch	·	650 m	MPC · JPL
440482	2005 TY_{16}	—	October 1, 2005	Socorro	LINEAR	·	720 m	MPC · JPL
440483	2005 TY_{45}	—	September 24, 2005	Kitt Peak	Spacewatch	·	970 m	MPC · JPL
440484	2005 TO_{47}	—	October 5, 2005	Kitt Peak	Spacewatch	·	1.8 km	MPC · JPL
440485	2005 TR_{47}	—	October 5, 2005	Kitt Peak	Spacewatch	·	1.0 km	MPC · JPL
440486	2005 TB_{50}	—	September 30, 2005	Catalina	CSS	·	670 m	MPC · JPL
440487	2005 TS_{60}	—	October 3, 2005	Kitt Peak	Spacewatch	EOS	1.4 km	MPC · JPL
440488	2005 TE_{84}	—	October 3, 2005	Kitt Peak	Spacewatch	·	620 m	MPC · JPL
440489	2005 TT_{85}	—	October 3, 2005	Kitt Peak	Spacewatch	·	1.4 km	MPC · JPL
440490	2005 TM_{101}	—	October 1, 2005	Catalina	CSS	·	760 m	MPC · JPL
440491	2005 TA_{102}	—	October 7, 2005	Mount Lemmon	Mount Lemmon Survey	·	1.5 km	MPC · JPL
440492	2005 TK_{106}	—	October 9, 2005	Kitt Peak	Spacewatch	·	2.5 km	MPC · JPL
440493	2005 TU_{110}	—	September 29, 2005	Kitt Peak	Spacewatch	·	760 m	MPC · JPL
440494	2005 TW_{111}	—	October 7, 2005	Kitt Peak	Spacewatch	EOS	1.5 km	MPC · JPL
440495	2005 TZ_{112}	—	September 27, 2005	Kitt Peak	Spacewatch	VER	2.1 km	MPC · JPL
440496	2005 TA_{134}	—	October 10, 2005	Catalina	CSS	·	2.0 km	MPC · JPL
440497	2005 TX_{141}	—	October 8, 2005	Kitt Peak	Spacewatch	·	540 m	MPC · JPL
440498	2005 TO_{144}	—	September 23, 2005	Kitt Peak	Spacewatch	·	730 m	MPC · JPL
440499	2005 TZ_{146}	—	October 8, 2005	Kitt Peak	Spacewatch	·	2.1 km	MPC · JPL
440500	2005 TP_{162}	—	October 9, 2005	Kitt Peak	Spacewatch	·	2.9 km	MPC · JPL

== 440501–440600 ==
back to top

Designation			Discovery			Properties		Ref
Permanent	Provisional	Named after	Date	Site	Discoverer(s)	Category	Diam.	Ref
440501	2005 TX_{166}	—	September 29, 2005	Kitt Peak	Spacewatch	·	820 m	MPC · JPL
440502	2005 TG_{187}	—	October 6, 2005	Kitt Peak	Spacewatch	THM	2.4 km	MPC · JPL
440503	2005 TW_{193}	—	October 1, 2005	Mount Lemmon	Mount Lemmon Survey	EOS	1.8 km	MPC · JPL
440504	2005 TY_{193}	—	October 1, 2005	Mount Lemmon	Mount Lemmon Survey	HYG	2.5 km	MPC · JPL
440505	2005 TC_{194}	—	October 1, 2005	Kitt Peak	Spacewatch	·	1.4 km	MPC · JPL
440506	2005 TC_{196}	—	October 7, 2005	Kitt Peak	Spacewatch	·	1.5 km	MPC · JPL
440507	2005 UF_{25}	—	October 23, 2005	Kitt Peak	Spacewatch	·	2.5 km	MPC · JPL
440508	2005 UW_{27}	—	October 23, 2005	Kitt Peak	Spacewatch	·	2.5 km	MPC · JPL
440509	2005 UW_{30}	—	October 24, 2005	Kitt Peak	Spacewatch	·	1.5 km	MPC · JPL
440510	2005 UD_{35}	—	October 24, 2005	Kitt Peak	Spacewatch	·	2.5 km	MPC · JPL
440511	2005 UM_{35}	—	October 24, 2005	Kitt Peak	Spacewatch	·	1.6 km	MPC · JPL
440512	2005 UZ_{35}	—	October 24, 2005	Kitt Peak	Spacewatch	·	950 m	MPC · JPL
440513	2005 UB_{36}	—	October 24, 2005	Kitt Peak	Spacewatch	THM	2.0 km	MPC · JPL
440514	2005 US_{39}	—	October 24, 2005	Kitt Peak	Spacewatch	THM	2.0 km	MPC · JPL
440515	2005 UT_{41}	—	October 5, 2005	Kitt Peak	Spacewatch	·	490 m	MPC · JPL
440516	2005 US_{56}	—	October 24, 2005	Anderson Mesa	LONEOS	(2076)	790 m	MPC · JPL
440517	2005 UQ_{60}	—	October 25, 2005	Mount Lemmon	Mount Lemmon Survey	·	2.5 km	MPC · JPL
440518	2005 UQ_{70}	—	October 23, 2005	Catalina	CSS	EOS	2.4 km	MPC · JPL
440519	2005 UT_{72}	—	October 23, 2005	Palomar	NEAT	·	2.2 km	MPC · JPL
440520	2005 UP_{82}	—	October 22, 2005	Kitt Peak	Spacewatch	·	550 m	MPC · JPL
440521	2005 UW_{84}	—	October 22, 2005	Kitt Peak	Spacewatch	EOS	1.6 km	MPC · JPL
440522	2005 UQ_{87}	—	October 22, 2005	Kitt Peak	Spacewatch	EOS	1.5 km	MPC · JPL
440523	2005 UH_{88}	—	October 22, 2005	Kitt Peak	Spacewatch	·	800 m	MPC · JPL
440524	2005 UA_{89}	—	October 22, 2005	Kitt Peak	Spacewatch	·	2.2 km	MPC · JPL
440525	2005 UX_{89}	—	October 22, 2005	Kitt Peak	Spacewatch	·	840 m	MPC · JPL
440526	2005 UD_{92}	—	October 22, 2005	Kitt Peak	Spacewatch	·	3.6 km	MPC · JPL
440527	2005 UJ_{95}	—	October 22, 2005	Kitt Peak	Spacewatch	THM	2.1 km	MPC · JPL
440528	2005 UN_{99}	—	October 22, 2005	Kitt Peak	Spacewatch	EOS	1.9 km	MPC · JPL
440529	2005 UB_{100}	—	October 22, 2005	Kitt Peak	Spacewatch	·	2.9 km	MPC · JPL
440530	2005 UU_{101}	—	October 22, 2005	Kitt Peak	Spacewatch	NYS	960 m	MPC · JPL
440531	2005 UX_{105}	—	October 22, 2005	Kitt Peak	Spacewatch	·	660 m	MPC · JPL
440532	2005 UE_{120}	—	October 12, 2005	Kitt Peak	Spacewatch	·	640 m	MPC · JPL
440533	2005 UD_{129}	—	October 24, 2005	Kitt Peak	Spacewatch	THM	2.0 km	MPC · JPL
440534	2005 UA_{136}	—	October 25, 2005	Mount Lemmon	Mount Lemmon Survey	·	2.3 km	MPC · JPL
440535	2005 UA_{147}	—	October 26, 2005	Kitt Peak	Spacewatch	·	2.5 km	MPC · JPL
440536	2005 UL_{152}	—	October 26, 2005	Kitt Peak	Spacewatch	·	820 m	MPC · JPL
440537	2005 UK_{158}	—	October 10, 2005	Catalina	CSS	H	590 m	MPC · JPL
440538	2005 UJ_{165}	—	October 24, 2005	Kitt Peak	Spacewatch	·	1.9 km	MPC · JPL
440539	2005 UA_{177}	—	October 24, 2005	Kitt Peak	Spacewatch	·	2.0 km	MPC · JPL
440540	2005 UR_{180}	—	October 1, 2005	Mount Lemmon	Mount Lemmon Survey	·	3.3 km	MPC · JPL
440541	2005 UH_{186}	—	October 25, 2005	Mount Lemmon	Mount Lemmon Survey	·	2.8 km	MPC · JPL
440542	2005 UW_{195}	—	September 29, 2005	Mount Lemmon	Mount Lemmon Survey	·	1.7 km	MPC · JPL
440543	2005 UQ_{196}	—	October 24, 2005	Kitt Peak	Spacewatch	THM	2.3 km	MPC · JPL
440544	2005 UU_{218}	—	October 25, 2005	Kitt Peak	Spacewatch	·	2.6 km	MPC · JPL
440545	2005 UQ_{222}	—	October 25, 2005	Kitt Peak	Spacewatch	·	2.3 km	MPC · JPL
440546	2005 UT_{224}	—	October 25, 2005	Kitt Peak	Spacewatch	·	2.5 km	MPC · JPL
440547	2005 UJ_{225}	—	October 25, 2005	Kitt Peak	Spacewatch	·	1.7 km	MPC · JPL
440548	2005 UD_{236}	—	October 25, 2005	Kitt Peak	Spacewatch	V	650 m	MPC · JPL
440549	2005 UN_{237}	—	October 25, 2005	Kitt Peak	Spacewatch	EOS	1.5 km	MPC · JPL
440550	2005 UX_{253}	—	October 28, 2005	Catalina	CSS	·	2.7 km	MPC · JPL
440551	2005 US_{254}	—	October 22, 2005	Kitt Peak	Spacewatch	·	2.6 km	MPC · JPL
440552	2005 UF_{261}	—	October 25, 2005	Mount Lemmon	Mount Lemmon Survey	·	2.3 km	MPC · JPL
440553	2005 UH_{261}	—	October 25, 2005	Mount Lemmon	Mount Lemmon Survey	·	2.9 km	MPC · JPL
440554	2005 UP_{263}	—	October 27, 2005	Kitt Peak	Spacewatch	·	2.1 km	MPC · JPL
440555	2005 UX_{264}	—	October 27, 2005	Mount Lemmon	Mount Lemmon Survey	THM	2.3 km	MPC · JPL
440556	2005 UD_{265}	—	October 27, 2005	Kitt Peak	Spacewatch	·	1.9 km	MPC · JPL
440557	2005 UG_{278}	—	October 24, 2005	Kitt Peak	Spacewatch	·	640 m	MPC · JPL
440558	2005 UN_{297}	—	October 26, 2005	Kitt Peak	Spacewatch	THM	2.0 km	MPC · JPL
440559	2005 UO_{299}	—	October 26, 2005	Kitt Peak	Spacewatch	·	2.8 km	MPC · JPL
440560	2005 UA_{311}	—	October 29, 2005	Mount Lemmon	Mount Lemmon Survey	THM	1.8 km	MPC · JPL
440561	2005 UM_{324}	—	October 29, 2005	Kitt Peak	Spacewatch	NYS	770 m	MPC · JPL
440562	2005 UD_{325}	—	November 18, 2000	Kitt Peak	Spacewatch	·	2.0 km	MPC · JPL
440563	2005 US_{327}	—	October 29, 2005	Kitt Peak	Spacewatch	·	650 m	MPC · JPL
440564	2005 UX_{329}	—	October 28, 2005	Kitt Peak	Spacewatch	THM	1.7 km	MPC · JPL
440565	2005 UX_{331}	—	October 29, 2005	Kitt Peak	Spacewatch	EOS	2.0 km	MPC · JPL
440566	2005 UG_{332}	—	October 29, 2005	Catalina	CSS	·	1.7 km	MPC · JPL
440567	2005 UK_{355}	—	October 29, 2005	Catalina	CSS	·	1.2 km	MPC · JPL
440568	2005 UP_{360}	—	October 27, 2005	Kitt Peak	Spacewatch	·	2.0 km	MPC · JPL
440569	2005 UX_{382}	—	October 27, 2005	Anderson Mesa	LONEOS	·	810 m	MPC · JPL
440570	2005 UJ_{385}	—	October 27, 2005	Kitt Peak	Spacewatch	·	2.6 km	MPC · JPL
440571	2005 UX_{395}	—	October 30, 2005	Catalina	CSS	·	620 m	MPC · JPL
440572	2005 UG_{404}	—	October 29, 2005	Mount Lemmon	Mount Lemmon Survey	THM	2.0 km	MPC · JPL
440573	2005 UL_{407}	—	October 1, 2005	Kitt Peak	Spacewatch	·	510 m	MPC · JPL
440574	2005 UE_{422}	—	October 27, 2005	Mount Lemmon	Mount Lemmon Survey	·	2.5 km	MPC · JPL
440575	2005 UG_{424}	—	October 28, 2005	Kitt Peak	Spacewatch	·	1.5 km	MPC · JPL
440576	2005 UN_{427}	—	October 13, 1998	Kitt Peak	Spacewatch	·	740 m	MPC · JPL
440577	2005 UL_{446}	—	October 29, 2005	Catalina	CSS	EOS	2.4 km	MPC · JPL
440578	2005 UT_{467}	—	October 30, 2005	Kitt Peak	Spacewatch	V	590 m	MPC · JPL
440579	2005 UW_{467}	—	October 30, 2005	Kitt Peak	Spacewatch	·	2.1 km	MPC · JPL
440580	2005 UG_{473}	—	October 30, 2005	Mount Lemmon	Mount Lemmon Survey	·	730 m	MPC · JPL
440581	2005 UM_{477}	—	October 26, 2005	Anderson Mesa	LONEOS	·	3.6 km	MPC · JPL
440582	2005 UU_{484}	—	October 22, 2005	Catalina	CSS	·	2.5 km	MPC · JPL
440583	2005 UA_{489}	—	October 10, 2005	Catalina	CSS	·	2.1 km	MPC · JPL
440584	2005 UH_{501}	—	October 27, 2005	Catalina	CSS	·	3.0 km	MPC · JPL
440585	2005 UT_{502}	—	October 31, 2005	Anderson Mesa	LONEOS	·	2.8 km	MPC · JPL
440586	2005 UN_{508}	—	October 27, 2005	Anderson Mesa	LONEOS	·	870 m	MPC · JPL
440587	2005 UU_{510}	—	October 25, 2005	Mount Lemmon	Mount Lemmon Survey	·	2.5 km	MPC · JPL
440588	2005 UV_{511}	—	October 28, 2005	Mount Lemmon	Mount Lemmon Survey	·	3.1 km	MPC · JPL
440589	2005 UM_{519}	—	September 23, 2005	Kitt Peak	Spacewatch	·	1.6 km	MPC · JPL
440590	2005 UQ_{523}	—	October 27, 2005	Apache Point	A. C. Becker	·	3.2 km	MPC · JPL
440591	2005 UP_{525}	—	October 25, 2005	Mount Lemmon	Mount Lemmon Survey	·	2.3 km	MPC · JPL
440592	2005 UE_{526}	—	October 31, 2005	Kitt Peak	Spacewatch	·	2.1 km	MPC · JPL
440593	2005 UW_{526}	—	October 27, 2005	Mount Lemmon	Mount Lemmon Survey	·	960 m	MPC · JPL
440594	2005 UH_{529}	—	October 24, 2005	Kitt Peak	Spacewatch	EOS	1.9 km	MPC · JPL
440595	2005 VG_{8}	—	November 1, 2005	Kitt Peak	Spacewatch	·	1.4 km	MPC · JPL
440596	2005 VY_{10}	—	October 22, 2005	Kitt Peak	Spacewatch	·	2.6 km	MPC · JPL
440597	2005 VY_{25}	—	October 25, 2005	Kitt Peak	Spacewatch	·	820 m	MPC · JPL
440598	2005 VR_{31}	—	November 4, 2005	Kitt Peak	Spacewatch	·	1.9 km	MPC · JPL
440599	2005 VC_{32}	—	October 25, 2005	Mount Lemmon	Mount Lemmon Survey	·	2.2 km	MPC · JPL
440600	2005 VD_{32}	—	September 30, 2005	Mount Lemmon	Mount Lemmon Survey	·	690 m	MPC · JPL

== 440601–440700 ==
back to top

Designation			Discovery			Properties		Ref
Permanent	Provisional	Named after	Date	Site	Discoverer(s)	Category	Diam.	Ref
440601	2005 VC_{33}	—	November 4, 2005	Kitt Peak	Spacewatch	·	1.0 km	MPC · JPL
440602	2005 VT_{54}	—	October 25, 2005	Kitt Peak	Spacewatch	EOS	1.9 km	MPC · JPL
440603	2005 VQ_{62}	—	October 1, 2005	Catalina	CSS	·	570 m	MPC · JPL
440604	2005 VC_{66}	—	October 25, 2005	Kitt Peak	Spacewatch	·	1.1 km	MPC · JPL
440605	2005 VS_{67}	—	October 28, 2005	Kitt Peak	Spacewatch	·	2.5 km	MPC · JPL
440606	2005 VK_{72}	—	November 1, 2005	Mount Lemmon	Mount Lemmon Survey	·	2.4 km	MPC · JPL
440607	2005 VB_{76}	—	October 1, 2005	Catalina	CSS	·	810 m	MPC · JPL
440608	2005 VM_{80}	—	October 25, 2005	Kitt Peak	Spacewatch	·	2.0 km	MPC · JPL
440609	2005 VQ_{95}	—	November 6, 2005	Kitt Peak	Spacewatch	·	830 m	MPC · JPL
440610	2005 VJ_{101}	—	October 25, 2005	Kitt Peak	Spacewatch	·	3.5 km	MPC · JPL
440611	2005 VO_{112}	—	November 8, 2005	Socorro	LINEAR	·	4.8 km	MPC · JPL
440612	2005 VJ_{114}	—	October 27, 2005	Mount Lemmon	Mount Lemmon Survey	·	830 m	MPC · JPL
440613	2005 VD_{117}	—	November 11, 2005	Kitt Peak	Spacewatch	·	680 m	MPC · JPL
440614	2005 VM_{117}	—	November 11, 2005	Kitt Peak	Spacewatch	THM	2.3 km	MPC · JPL
440615	2005 VW_{117}	—	November 1, 2005	Catalina	CSS	·	3.0 km	MPC · JPL
440616	2005 VA_{130}	—	October 8, 2005	Kitt Peak	Spacewatch	V	530 m	MPC · JPL
440617	2005 WQ_{2}	—	November 22, 2005	Socorro	LINEAR	·	3.1 km	MPC · JPL
440618	2005 WJ_{3}	—	November 20, 2005	Palomar	NEAT	·	3.0 km	MPC · JPL
440619	2005 WS_{9}	—	November 21, 2005	Junk Bond	D. Healy	·	760 m	MPC · JPL
440620	2005 WG_{10}	—	October 31, 2005	Mount Lemmon	Mount Lemmon Survey	·	3.0 km	MPC · JPL
440621	2005 WV_{12}	—	November 22, 2005	Kitt Peak	Spacewatch	·	920 m	MPC · JPL
440622	2005 WV_{22}	—	October 30, 2005	Mount Lemmon	Mount Lemmon Survey	·	2.9 km	MPC · JPL
440623	2005 WH_{27}	—	October 28, 2005	Mount Lemmon	Mount Lemmon Survey	·	540 m	MPC · JPL
440624	2005 WS_{33}	—	November 21, 2005	Kitt Peak	Spacewatch	EOS	2.2 km	MPC · JPL
440625	2005 WA_{34}	—	November 21, 2005	Kitt Peak	Spacewatch	·	1.1 km	MPC · JPL
440626	2005 WG_{38}	—	November 22, 2005	Kitt Peak	Spacewatch	·	730 m	MPC · JPL
440627	2005 WS_{45}	—	October 25, 2005	Mount Lemmon	Mount Lemmon Survey	EOS	1.7 km	MPC · JPL
440628	2005 WL_{48}	—	November 25, 2005	Kitt Peak	Spacewatch	·	3.9 km	MPC · JPL
440629	2005 WC_{51}	—	November 25, 2005	Kitt Peak	Spacewatch	NYS	710 m	MPC · JPL
440630	2005 WH_{59}	—	October 25, 2005	Catalina	CSS	·	3.9 km	MPC · JPL
440631	2005 WD_{65}	—	October 25, 2005	Catalina	CSS	PHO	1.3 km	MPC · JPL
440632	2005 WN_{69}	—	November 26, 2005	Kitt Peak	Spacewatch	·	3.3 km	MPC · JPL
440633	2005 WC_{71}	—	November 21, 2005	Catalina	CSS	·	740 m	MPC · JPL
440634	2005 WN_{71}	—	October 25, 2005	Kitt Peak	Spacewatch	·	3.0 km	MPC · JPL
440635	2005 WM_{72}	—	November 25, 2005	Kitt Peak	Spacewatch	·	4.9 km	MPC · JPL
440636	2005 WM_{75}	—	November 1, 2005	Kitt Peak	Spacewatch	·	760 m	MPC · JPL
440637	2005 WJ_{82}	—	October 30, 2005	Kitt Peak	Spacewatch	·	710 m	MPC · JPL
440638	2005 WS_{83}	—	October 30, 2005	Mount Lemmon	Mount Lemmon Survey	·	700 m	MPC · JPL
440639	2005 WP_{87}	—	November 28, 2005	Mount Lemmon	Mount Lemmon Survey	·	3.9 km	MPC · JPL
440640	2005 WM_{90}	—	November 28, 2005	Socorro	LINEAR	·	2.3 km	MPC · JPL
440641	2005 WK_{106}	—	October 28, 2005	Mount Lemmon	Mount Lemmon Survey	·	1.9 km	MPC · JPL
440642	2005 WP_{107}	—	November 25, 2005	Catalina	CSS	EOS	2.0 km	MPC · JPL
440643	2005 WL_{108}	—	October 28, 2005	Kitt Peak	Spacewatch	·	790 m	MPC · JPL
440644	2005 WT_{116}	—	November 30, 2005	Mount Lemmon	Mount Lemmon Survey	EOS	2.0 km	MPC · JPL
440645	2005 WB_{117}	—	November 21, 2005	Catalina	CSS	·	950 m	MPC · JPL
440646	2005 WM_{127}	—	November 25, 2005	Mount Lemmon	Mount Lemmon Survey	THM	1.8 km	MPC · JPL
440647	2005 WY_{135}	—	November 26, 2005	Kitt Peak	Spacewatch	·	3.2 km	MPC · JPL
440648	2005 WB_{164}	—	November 29, 2005	Kitt Peak	Spacewatch	·	1.0 km	MPC · JPL
440649	2005 WO_{164}	—	November 29, 2005	Mount Lemmon	Mount Lemmon Survey	·	1.6 km	MPC · JPL
440650	2005 WL_{166}	—	November 29, 2005	Mount Lemmon	Mount Lemmon Survey	·	1.9 km	MPC · JPL
440651	2005 WN_{177}	—	November 30, 2005	Kitt Peak	Spacewatch	·	1.0 km	MPC · JPL
440652	2005 WE_{178}	—	November 30, 2005	Kitt Peak	Spacewatch	T_{j} (2.96)	4.7 km	MPC · JPL
440653	2005 WK_{178}	—	November 30, 2005	Kitt Peak	Spacewatch	·	1.2 km	MPC · JPL
440654	2005 WB_{184}	—	November 28, 2005	Socorro	LINEAR	·	5.3 km	MPC · JPL
440655	2005 WQ_{207}	—	November 21, 2005	Kitt Peak	Spacewatch	·	4.6 km	MPC · JPL
440656	2005 WJ_{208}	—	November 26, 2005	Kitt Peak	Spacewatch	·	3.2 km	MPC · JPL
440657	2005 XM_{1}	—	October 28, 2005	Mount Lemmon	Mount Lemmon Survey	·	2.9 km	MPC · JPL
440658	2005 XN_{14}	—	December 1, 2005	Kitt Peak	Spacewatch	·	4.7 km	MPC · JPL
440659	2005 XF_{25}	—	December 4, 2005	Kitt Peak	Spacewatch	·	2.8 km	MPC · JPL
440660	2005 XM_{28}	—	December 1, 2005	Catalina	CSS	·	810 m	MPC · JPL
440661	2005 XG_{34}	—	December 4, 2005	Kitt Peak	Spacewatch	·	2.2 km	MPC · JPL
440662	2005 XB_{36}	—	December 4, 2005	Kitt Peak	Spacewatch	·	930 m	MPC · JPL
440663	2005 XO_{58}	—	November 26, 2005	Mount Lemmon	Mount Lemmon Survey	·	2.1 km	MPC · JPL
440664	2005 XV_{61}	—	October 25, 2005	Kitt Peak	Spacewatch	·	720 m	MPC · JPL
440665	2005 XT_{62}	—	December 5, 2005	Mount Lemmon	Mount Lemmon Survey	·	3.8 km	MPC · JPL
440666	2005 XH_{63}	—	December 5, 2005	Mount Lemmon	Mount Lemmon Survey	·	1.5 km	MPC · JPL
440667	2005 XV_{67}	—	November 25, 2005	Kitt Peak	Spacewatch	HYG	2.8 km	MPC · JPL
440668	2005 XU_{81}	—	December 7, 2005	Kitt Peak	Spacewatch	·	3.1 km	MPC · JPL
440669	2005 XJ_{82}	—	December 10, 2005	Kitt Peak	Spacewatch	EOS	1.5 km	MPC · JPL
440670 Bécassine	2005 YL_{4}	Bécassine	December 22, 2005	Nogales	J.-C. Merlin	·	760 m	MPC · JPL
440671	2005 YV_{16}	—	December 22, 2005	Kitt Peak	Spacewatch	·	720 m	MPC · JPL
440672	2005 YU_{17}	—	December 23, 2005	Kitt Peak	Spacewatch	·	930 m	MPC · JPL
440673	2005 YC_{19}	—	November 25, 2005	Kitt Peak	Spacewatch	·	3.1 km	MPC · JPL
440674	2005 YJ_{19}	—	December 24, 2005	Kitt Peak	Spacewatch	·	1.3 km	MPC · JPL
440675	2005 YP_{20}	—	December 24, 2005	Kitt Peak	Spacewatch	(5)	1.9 km	MPC · JPL
440676	2005 YE_{27}	—	December 22, 2005	Kitt Peak	Spacewatch	V	650 m	MPC · JPL
440677	2005 YJ_{31}	—	December 4, 2005	Mount Lemmon	Mount Lemmon Survey	·	2.8 km	MPC · JPL
440678	2005 YU_{33}	—	December 24, 2005	Kitt Peak	Spacewatch	·	3.8 km	MPC · JPL
440679	2005 YV_{36}	—	December 25, 2005	Kitt Peak	Spacewatch	·	1.3 km	MPC · JPL
440680	2005 YW_{36}	—	December 23, 2005	Mauna Kea	D. J. Tholen	T_{j} (2.96)	1.3 km	MPC · JPL
440681	2005 YG_{37}	—	December 21, 2005	Catalina	CSS	·	4.4 km	MPC · JPL
440682	2005 YX_{41}	—	December 22, 2005	Kitt Peak	Spacewatch	·	1.1 km	MPC · JPL
440683	2005 YG_{56}	—	December 21, 2005	Catalina	CSS	H	630 m	MPC · JPL
440684	2005 YC_{59}	—	December 25, 2005	Mount Lemmon	Mount Lemmon Survey	·	2.6 km	MPC · JPL
440685	2005 YU_{61}	—	December 24, 2005	Kitt Peak	Spacewatch	THM	2.3 km	MPC · JPL
440686	2005 YJ_{62}	—	December 24, 2005	Kitt Peak	Spacewatch	THM	2.3 km	MPC · JPL
440687	2005 YV_{62}	—	December 24, 2005	Kitt Peak	Spacewatch	·	960 m	MPC · JPL
440688	2005 YF_{64}	—	December 24, 2005	Kitt Peak	Spacewatch	·	710 m	MPC · JPL
440689	2005 YK_{68}	—	December 26, 2005	Kitt Peak	Spacewatch	·	3.0 km	MPC · JPL
440690	2005 YO_{73}	—	December 24, 2005	Kitt Peak	Spacewatch	MAS	570 m	MPC · JPL
440691	2005 YP_{73}	—	December 24, 2005	Kitt Peak	Spacewatch	·	1.5 km	MPC · JPL
440692	2005 YY_{73}	—	December 24, 2005	Kitt Peak	Spacewatch	·	2.9 km	MPC · JPL
440693	2005 YJ_{81}	—	December 24, 2005	Kitt Peak	Spacewatch	HYG	2.4 km	MPC · JPL
440694	2005 YF_{82}	—	December 24, 2005	Kitt Peak	Spacewatch	V	800 m	MPC · JPL
440695	2005 YV_{83}	—	December 24, 2005	Kitt Peak	Spacewatch	V	670 m	MPC · JPL
440696	2005 YM_{93}	—	December 10, 2005	Catalina	CSS	H	640 m	MPC · JPL
440697	2005 YD_{94}	—	December 26, 2005	Catalina	CSS	·	1.0 km	MPC · JPL
440698	2005 YK_{94}	—	December 22, 2005	Catalina	CSS	H	680 m	MPC · JPL
440699	2005 YD_{96}	—	December 25, 2005	Kitt Peak	Spacewatch	LIX	3.5 km	MPC · JPL
440700	2005 YV_{100}	—	December 2, 2005	Mount Lemmon	Mount Lemmon Survey	·	2.3 km	MPC · JPL

== 440701–440800 ==
back to top

Designation			Discovery			Properties		Ref
Permanent	Provisional	Named after	Date	Site	Discoverer(s)	Category	Diam.	Ref
440701	2005 YW_{123}	—	December 25, 2005	Kitt Peak	Spacewatch	TIR	2.9 km	MPC · JPL
440702	2005 YO_{125}	—	December 26, 2005	Kitt Peak	Spacewatch	NYS	730 m	MPC · JPL
440703	2005 YF_{132}	—	December 25, 2005	Mount Lemmon	Mount Lemmon Survey	·	1.2 km	MPC · JPL
440704	2005 YZ_{141}	—	December 28, 2005	Mount Lemmon	Mount Lemmon Survey	·	3.8 km	MPC · JPL
440705	2005 YT_{153}	—	December 29, 2005	Kitt Peak	Spacewatch	·	4.0 km	MPC · JPL
440706	2005 YS_{158}	—	December 27, 2005	Kitt Peak	Spacewatch	·	760 m	MPC · JPL
440707	2005 YK_{173}	—	December 24, 2005	Socorro	LINEAR	·	1.1 km	MPC · JPL
440708	2005 YG_{190}	—	December 30, 2005	Kitt Peak	Spacewatch	·	2.6 km	MPC · JPL
440709	2005 YL_{190}	—	December 30, 2005	Kitt Peak	Spacewatch	·	900 m	MPC · JPL
440710	2005 YV_{190}	—	November 30, 2005	Mount Lemmon	Mount Lemmon Survey	·	920 m	MPC · JPL
440711	2005 YS_{195}	—	December 31, 2005	Kitt Peak	Spacewatch	·	3.5 km	MPC · JPL
440712	2005 YR_{200}	—	December 22, 2005	Kitt Peak	Spacewatch	·	910 m	MPC · JPL
440713	2005 YX_{200}	—	December 22, 2005	Kitt Peak	Spacewatch	·	1.2 km	MPC · JPL
440714	2005 YK_{219}	—	December 31, 2005	Kitt Peak	Spacewatch	THM	2.0 km	MPC · JPL
440715	2005 YX_{231}	—	December 27, 2005	Mount Nyukasa	Japan Aerospace Exploration Agency	·	1.2 km	MPC · JPL
440716	2005 YP_{247}	—	December 30, 2005	Kitt Peak	Spacewatch	·	900 m	MPC · JPL
440717	2005 YV_{248}	—	December 28, 2005	Kitt Peak	Spacewatch	TIR	3.4 km	MPC · JPL
440718	2005 YA_{269}	—	October 30, 2005	Kitt Peak	Spacewatch	·	3.4 km	MPC · JPL
440719	2005 YT_{286}	—	December 6, 2005	Mount Lemmon	Mount Lemmon Survey	·	3.5 km	MPC · JPL
440720	2006 AZ_{24}	—	December 4, 2005	Mount Lemmon	Mount Lemmon Survey	·	790 m	MPC · JPL
440721	2006 AR_{27}	—	January 5, 2006	Kitt Peak	Spacewatch	·	880 m	MPC · JPL
440722	2006 AV_{35}	—	January 4, 2006	Mount Lemmon	Mount Lemmon Survey	·	1.4 km	MPC · JPL
440723	2006 AT_{37}	—	January 4, 2006	Kitt Peak	Spacewatch	·	1.2 km	MPC · JPL
440724	2006 AS_{43}	—	January 7, 2006	Mount Lemmon	Mount Lemmon Survey	·	1.1 km	MPC · JPL
440725	2006 AC_{44}	—	January 7, 2006	Anderson Mesa	LONEOS	PHO	1.4 km	MPC · JPL
440726	2006 AN_{49}	—	December 30, 2005	Kitt Peak	Spacewatch	·	3.0 km	MPC · JPL
440727	2006 AY_{54}	—	January 5, 2006	Kitt Peak	Spacewatch	·	860 m	MPC · JPL
440728	2006 AO_{58}	—	January 4, 2006	Mount Lemmon	Mount Lemmon Survey	·	630 m	MPC · JPL
440729	2006 AA_{71}	—	January 6, 2006	Kitt Peak	Spacewatch	CYB	3.9 km	MPC · JPL
440730	2006 AJ_{88}	—	January 5, 2006	Kitt Peak	Spacewatch	·	980 m	MPC · JPL
440731	2006 BA_{6}	—	October 5, 2005	Kitt Peak	Spacewatch	·	3.3 km	MPC · JPL
440732	2006 BP_{8}	—	January 23, 2006	Mount Lemmon	Mount Lemmon Survey	H	620 m	MPC · JPL
440733	2006 BS_{34}	—	January 22, 2006	Mount Lemmon	Mount Lemmon Survey	·	3.9 km	MPC · JPL
440734	2006 BC_{35}	—	January 22, 2006	Mount Lemmon	Mount Lemmon Survey	V	760 m	MPC · JPL
440735	2006 BY_{48}	—	January 25, 2006	Kitt Peak	Spacewatch	H	540 m	MPC · JPL
440736	2006 BF_{52}	—	January 25, 2006	Kitt Peak	Spacewatch	·	1.2 km	MPC · JPL
440737	2006 BA_{57}	—	January 7, 2006	Mount Lemmon	Mount Lemmon Survey	·	1.3 km	MPC · JPL
440738	2006 BK_{59}	—	January 7, 2006	Kitt Peak	Spacewatch	NYS	1.3 km	MPC · JPL
440739	2006 BT_{88}	—	January 25, 2006	Kitt Peak	Spacewatch	·	1.5 km	MPC · JPL
440740	2006 BL_{118}	—	January 26, 2006	Kitt Peak	Spacewatch	V	630 m	MPC · JPL
440741	2006 BM_{135}	—	January 25, 2006	Kitt Peak	Spacewatch	THM	2.6 km	MPC · JPL
440742	2006 BN_{146}	—	January 23, 2006	Kitt Peak	Spacewatch	·	1.1 km	MPC · JPL
440743	2006 BF_{153}	—	January 25, 2006	Kitt Peak	Spacewatch	·	1.3 km	MPC · JPL
440744	2006 BS_{228}	—	January 31, 2006	Kitt Peak	Spacewatch	·	1.3 km	MPC · JPL
440745	2006 BQ_{254}	—	January 8, 2006	Mount Lemmon	Mount Lemmon Survey	·	3.0 km	MPC · JPL
440746	2006 BV_{255}	—	January 31, 2006	Kitt Peak	Spacewatch	PHO	1.1 km	MPC · JPL
440747	2006 BP_{269}	—	January 28, 2006	Anderson Mesa	LONEOS	H	620 m	MPC · JPL
440748	2006 DX_{3}	—	February 2, 2006	Mount Lemmon	Mount Lemmon Survey	H	590 m	MPC · JPL
440749	2006 DC_{5}	—	February 20, 2006	Kitt Peak	Spacewatch	·	720 m	MPC · JPL
440750	2006 DP_{32}	—	February 20, 2006	Mount Lemmon	Mount Lemmon Survey	·	1.7 km	MPC · JPL
440751	2006 DW_{32}	—	February 20, 2006	Mount Lemmon	Mount Lemmon Survey	H	510 m	MPC · JPL
440752	2006 DA_{42}	—	February 24, 2006	Socorro	LINEAR	H	660 m	MPC · JPL
440753	2006 DF_{83}	—	February 24, 2006	Kitt Peak	Spacewatch	·	3.3 km	MPC · JPL
440754	2006 DV_{151}	—	February 25, 2006	Kitt Peak	Spacewatch	·	770 m	MPC · JPL
440755	2006 DG_{168}	—	February 27, 2006	Kitt Peak	Spacewatch	EUN	940 m	MPC · JPL
440756	2006 DC_{216}	—	February 27, 2006	Kitt Peak	Spacewatch	H	510 m	MPC · JPL
440757	2006 DE_{216}	—	February 21, 2006	Mount Lemmon	Mount Lemmon Survey	·	1.0 km	MPC · JPL
440758	2006 EV_{10}	—	March 2, 2006	Kitt Peak	Spacewatch	·	1.1 km	MPC · JPL
440759	2006 ED_{20}	—	March 3, 2006	Kitt Peak	Spacewatch	H	510 m	MPC · JPL
440760	2006 EX_{41}	—	March 4, 2006	Catalina	CSS	·	2.0 km	MPC · JPL
440761	2006 EX_{44}	—	February 2, 2006	Mount Lemmon	Mount Lemmon Survey	·	900 m	MPC · JPL
440762	2006 FJ_{15}	—	March 23, 2006	Mount Lemmon	Mount Lemmon Survey	·	1.7 km	MPC · JPL
440763	2006 FE_{20}	—	March 23, 2006	Mount Lemmon	Mount Lemmon Survey	·	2.1 km	MPC · JPL
440764	2006 FA_{54}	—	March 23, 2006	Mount Lemmon	Mount Lemmon Survey	·	1.3 km	MPC · JPL
440765	2006 GV	—	April 2, 2006	Catalina	CSS	H	630 m	MPC · JPL
440766	2006 GK_{5}	—	April 2, 2006	Kitt Peak	Spacewatch	·	900 m	MPC · JPL
440767	2006 GR_{54}	—	April 2, 2006	Kitt Peak	Spacewatch	·	1.2 km	MPC · JPL
440768	2006 HY_{8}	—	April 7, 2006	Mount Lemmon	Mount Lemmon Survey	·	890 m	MPC · JPL
440769	2006 HS_{23}	—	April 20, 2006	Kitt Peak	Spacewatch	·	1.3 km	MPC · JPL
440770	2006 HH_{28}	—	April 20, 2006	Kitt Peak	Spacewatch	MAR	990 m	MPC · JPL
440771	2006 HJ_{28}	—	March 5, 2006	Kitt Peak	Spacewatch	·	1.6 km	MPC · JPL
440772	2006 HY_{37}	—	April 21, 2006	Kitt Peak	Spacewatch	·	1.3 km	MPC · JPL
440773	2006 HN_{38}	—	April 21, 2006	Kitt Peak	Spacewatch	·	990 m	MPC · JPL
440774	2006 HO_{59}	—	April 23, 2006	Catalina	CSS	·	1.2 km	MPC · JPL
440775	2006 HX_{69}	—	April 24, 2006	Kitt Peak	Spacewatch	EUN	1.2 km	MPC · JPL
440776	2006 HD_{84}	—	April 26, 2006	Kitt Peak	Spacewatch	·	1.2 km	MPC · JPL
440777	2006 HH_{97}	—	April 30, 2006	Kitt Peak	Spacewatch	·	990 m	MPC · JPL
440778	2006 HB_{154}	—	April 24, 2006	Kitt Peak	Spacewatch	·	1.0 km	MPC · JPL
440779	2006 JV_{24}	—	May 5, 2006	Anderson Mesa	LONEOS	·	2.0 km	MPC · JPL
440780	2006 JX_{80}	—	May 6, 2006	Mount Lemmon	Mount Lemmon Survey	·	1.2 km	MPC · JPL
440781	2006 KT_{18}	—	May 21, 2006	Kitt Peak	Spacewatch	JUN	980 m	MPC · JPL
440782	2006 KU_{18}	—	April 20, 2006	Catalina	CSS	·	1.2 km	MPC · JPL
440783	2006 KD_{45}	—	May 21, 2006	Kitt Peak	Spacewatch	EUN	1.0 km	MPC · JPL
440784	2006 KR_{69}	—	May 22, 2006	Kitt Peak	Spacewatch	·	990 m	MPC · JPL
440785	2006 KQ_{73}	—	May 23, 2006	Kitt Peak	Spacewatch	EUN	1.5 km	MPC · JPL
440786	2006 KO_{75}	—	January 16, 2005	Kitt Peak	Spacewatch	EUN	1.7 km	MPC · JPL
440787	2006 KF_{83}	—	May 8, 2006	Kitt Peak	Spacewatch	·	1.3 km	MPC · JPL
440788	2006 KX_{91}	—	May 25, 2006	Kitt Peak	Spacewatch	·	1.2 km	MPC · JPL
440789	2006 KK_{92}	—	May 25, 2006	Kitt Peak	Spacewatch	·	1.3 km	MPC · JPL
440790	2006 KP_{123}	—	May 8, 2006	Mount Lemmon	Mount Lemmon Survey	·	1.5 km	MPC · JPL
440791	2006 MV_{7}	—	June 18, 2006	Kitt Peak	Spacewatch	·	2.0 km	MPC · JPL
440792	2006 MA_{11}	—	June 19, 2006	Mount Lemmon	Mount Lemmon Survey	JUN	1.4 km	MPC · JPL
440793	2006 OK_{10}	—	July 25, 2006	Ottmarsheim	C. Rinner	·	2.2 km	MPC · JPL
440794 Wytrzyszczak	2006 OO_{14}	Wytrzyszczak	July 28, 2006	Andrushivka	Y. Ivaščenko	·	2.3 km	MPC · JPL
440795	2006 OK_{16}	—	July 18, 2006	Mount Lemmon	Mount Lemmon Survey	·	1.8 km	MPC · JPL
440796	2006 OB_{22}	—	July 22, 2006	Mount Lemmon	Mount Lemmon Survey	(18466)	2.1 km	MPC · JPL
440797	2006 PO_{6}	—	August 12, 2006	Palomar	NEAT	·	2.8 km	MPC · JPL
440798	2006 PZ_{7}	—	August 12, 2006	Palomar	NEAT	JUN	1.0 km	MPC · JPL
440799	2006 PZ_{9}	—	August 13, 2006	Palomar	NEAT	·	480 m	MPC · JPL
440800	2006 PA_{16}	—	August 15, 2006	Palomar	NEAT	·	2.3 km	MPC · JPL

== 440801–440900 ==
back to top

Designation			Discovery			Properties		Ref
Permanent	Provisional	Named after	Date	Site	Discoverer(s)	Category	Diam.	Ref
440801	2006 PZ_{18}	—	July 21, 2006	Mount Lemmon	Mount Lemmon Survey	·	1.6 km	MPC · JPL
440802	2006 PZ_{24}	—	August 13, 2006	Palomar	NEAT	·	2.8 km	MPC · JPL
440803	2006 QL_{4}	—	August 18, 2006	Kitt Peak	Spacewatch	·	1.7 km	MPC · JPL
440804	2006 QO_{15}	—	August 17, 2006	Palomar	NEAT	AEO	1.1 km	MPC · JPL
440805	2006 QE_{50}	—	August 22, 2006	Palomar	NEAT	AEO	1.0 km	MPC · JPL
440806	2006 QF_{56}	—	August 19, 2006	Kitt Peak	Spacewatch	·	1.5 km	MPC · JPL
440807	2006 QV_{57}	—	August 24, 2006	Socorro	LINEAR	·	3.1 km	MPC · JPL
440808	2006 QC_{62}	—	August 22, 2006	Palomar	NEAT	·	1.9 km	MPC · JPL
440809	2006 QM_{83}	—	August 27, 2006	Kitt Peak	Spacewatch	·	1.5 km	MPC · JPL
440810	2006 QK_{90}	—	August 19, 2006	Palomar	NEAT	·	2.8 km	MPC · JPL
440811	2006 QE_{104}	—	August 18, 2006	Kitt Peak	Spacewatch	·	1.8 km	MPC · JPL
440812	2006 QB_{108}	—	August 28, 2006	Catalina	CSS	·	1.3 km	MPC · JPL
440813	2006 QN_{119}	—	August 28, 2006	Socorro	LINEAR	·	2.5 km	MPC · JPL
440814	2006 QX_{122}	—	August 18, 2006	Anderson Mesa	LONEOS	·	1.7 km	MPC · JPL
440815	2006 QE_{125}	—	August 16, 2006	Palomar	NEAT	·	1.8 km	MPC · JPL
440816	2006 QF_{134}	—	August 24, 2006	Palomar	NEAT	·	2.2 km	MPC · JPL
440817	2006 QK_{149}	—	August 18, 2006	Kitt Peak	Spacewatch	·	1.7 km	MPC · JPL
440818	2006 QS_{152}	—	August 19, 2006	Kitt Peak	Spacewatch	·	1.6 km	MPC · JPL
440819	2006 QD_{177}	—	August 19, 2006	Kitt Peak	Spacewatch	·	1.5 km	MPC · JPL
440820	2006 RY	—	September 3, 2006	Cordell-Lorenz	Cordell-Lorenz	·	2.5 km	MPC · JPL
440821	2006 RZ_{3}	—	September 12, 2006	Catalina	CSS	·	2.1 km	MPC · JPL
440822	2006 RZ_{4}	—	September 14, 2006	Catalina	CSS	·	1.4 km	MPC · JPL
440823	2006 RP_{8}	—	September 12, 2006	Catalina	CSS	·	1.7 km	MPC · JPL
440824	2006 RX_{8}	—	September 12, 2006	Catalina	CSS	JUN	1.2 km	MPC · JPL
440825	2006 RX_{35}	—	September 14, 2006	Catalina	CSS	·	2.4 km	MPC · JPL
440826	2006 RD_{36}	—	September 14, 2006	Palomar	NEAT	·	2.5 km	MPC · JPL
440827	2006 RB_{38}	—	September 12, 2006	Catalina	CSS	·	2.1 km	MPC · JPL
440828	2006 RU_{41}	—	September 14, 2006	Kitt Peak	Spacewatch	·	2.8 km	MPC · JPL
440829	2006 RQ_{44}	—	September 14, 2006	Kitt Peak	Spacewatch	AGN	860 m	MPC · JPL
440830	2006 RQ_{62}	—	August 27, 2006	Anderson Mesa	LONEOS	(13314)	1.8 km	MPC · JPL
440831	2006 RM_{70}	—	September 15, 2006	Kitt Peak	Spacewatch	·	2.5 km	MPC · JPL
440832	2006 RG_{76}	—	September 15, 2006	Kitt Peak	Spacewatch	·	2.1 km	MPC · JPL
440833 Kristenwalbolt	2006 RB_{116}	Kristenwalbolt	September 14, 2006	Mauna Kea	Masiero, J.	KOR	1.2 km	MPC · JPL
440834	2006 RJ_{122}	—	February 17, 2004	Kitt Peak	Spacewatch	·	2.1 km	MPC · JPL
440835	2006 SE_{3}	—	September 16, 2006	Anderson Mesa	LONEOS	·	1.8 km	MPC · JPL
440836	2006 SP_{16}	—	September 17, 2006	Kitt Peak	Spacewatch	·	1.5 km	MPC · JPL
440837	2006 SA_{32}	—	September 17, 2006	Kitt Peak	Spacewatch	·	2.0 km	MPC · JPL
440838	2006 SV_{43}	—	September 16, 2006	Catalina	CSS	·	2.6 km	MPC · JPL
440839	2006 SA_{45}	—	September 18, 2006	Kitt Peak	Spacewatch	·	1.9 km	MPC · JPL
440840	2006 SM_{65}	—	September 18, 2006	Catalina	CSS	·	1.9 km	MPC · JPL
440841	2006 SR_{79}	—	September 17, 2006	Catalina	CSS	·	2.2 km	MPC · JPL
440842	2006 SE_{84}	—	September 14, 2006	Kitt Peak	Spacewatch	GEF	1.2 km	MPC · JPL
440843	2006 SD_{103}	—	September 19, 2006	Kitt Peak	Spacewatch	·	1.4 km	MPC · JPL
440844	2006 SF_{105}	—	September 19, 2006	Socorro	LINEAR	·	2.9 km	MPC · JPL
440845	2006 SK_{109}	—	September 19, 2006	Kitt Peak	Spacewatch	KOR	1.2 km	MPC · JPL
440846	2006 SP_{115}	—	August 27, 2006	Kitt Peak	Spacewatch	HOF	2.2 km	MPC · JPL
440847	2006 SY_{126}	—	September 22, 2006	Anderson Mesa	LONEOS	·	1.8 km	MPC · JPL
440848	2006 SJ_{139}	—	September 21, 2006	Anderson Mesa	LONEOS	·	2.0 km	MPC · JPL
440849	2006 SW_{139}	—	September 22, 2006	Catalina	CSS	·	2.1 km	MPC · JPL
440850	2006 SB_{160}	—	September 23, 2006	Kitt Peak	Spacewatch	·	1.8 km	MPC · JPL
440851	2006 SX_{175}	—	September 18, 2006	Kitt Peak	Spacewatch	·	1.5 km	MPC · JPL
440852	2006 SF_{187}	—	September 20, 2006	Kitt Peak	Spacewatch	·	1.6 km	MPC · JPL
440853	2006 ST_{192}	—	September 18, 2006	Kitt Peak	Spacewatch	·	1.6 km	MPC · JPL
440854	2006 SM_{197}	—	September 25, 2006	Catalina	CSS	·	2.9 km	MPC · JPL
440855	2006 SF_{202}	—	September 24, 2006	Kitt Peak	Spacewatch	·	2.2 km	MPC · JPL
440856	2006 SZ_{213}	—	August 29, 2006	Anderson Mesa	LONEOS	·	2.5 km	MPC · JPL
440857	2006 SC_{260}	—	September 26, 2006	Kitt Peak	Spacewatch	·	1.6 km	MPC · JPL
440858	2006 SS_{277}	—	September 28, 2006	Kitt Peak	Spacewatch	KOR	1.4 km	MPC · JPL
440859	2006 ST_{286}	—	September 21, 2006	Anderson Mesa	LONEOS	DOR	2.5 km	MPC · JPL
440860	2006 SK_{290}	—	September 30, 2006	Catalina	CSS	·	1.9 km	MPC · JPL
440861	2006 SF_{296}	—	September 25, 2006	Kitt Peak	Spacewatch	·	1.6 km	MPC · JPL
440862	2006 SM_{329}	—	September 27, 2006	Kitt Peak	Spacewatch	AGN	970 m	MPC · JPL
440863	2006 SN_{342}	—	September 28, 2006	Kitt Peak	Spacewatch	DOR	2.5 km	MPC · JPL
440864	2006 SC_{355}	—	July 22, 2006	Mount Lemmon	Mount Lemmon Survey	·	2.3 km	MPC · JPL
440865	2006 SF_{378}	—	September 18, 2006	Apache Point	A. C. Becker	DOR	2.1 km	MPC · JPL
440866	2006 SA_{385}	—	September 29, 2006	Apache Point	A. C. Becker	EOS	1.9 km	MPC · JPL
440867	2006 SV_{394}	—	September 25, 2006	Catalina	CSS	·	1.9 km	MPC · JPL
440868	2006 ST_{405}	—	September 17, 2006	Kitt Peak	Spacewatch	·	1.6 km	MPC · JPL
440869	2006 SE_{411}	—	September 26, 2006	Kitt Peak	Spacewatch	AGN	950 m	MPC · JPL
440870	2006 TB_{12}	—	October 3, 2006	Kitt Peak	Spacewatch	·	1.8 km	MPC · JPL
440871	2006 TM_{12}	—	October 10, 2006	Palomar	NEAT	·	1.5 km	MPC · JPL
440872	2006 TL_{25}	—	September 27, 2006	Mount Lemmon	Mount Lemmon Survey	·	1.9 km	MPC · JPL
440873	2006 TB_{29}	—	October 4, 2006	Mount Lemmon	Mount Lemmon Survey	·	1.6 km	MPC · JPL
440874	2006 TR_{34}	—	October 12, 2006	Kitt Peak	Spacewatch	·	2.2 km	MPC · JPL
440875	2006 TX_{40}	—	October 16, 2001	Kitt Peak	Spacewatch	KOR	1.1 km	MPC · JPL
440876	2006 TD_{46}	—	October 12, 2006	Kitt Peak	Spacewatch	KOR	1.2 km	MPC · JPL
440877	2006 TF_{56}	—	October 13, 2006	Kitt Peak	Spacewatch	·	630 m	MPC · JPL
440878	2006 TC_{62}	—	October 9, 2006	Palomar	NEAT	·	1.9 km	MPC · JPL
440879	2006 TP_{74}	—	October 11, 2006	Palomar	NEAT	·	2.1 km	MPC · JPL
440880	2006 TY_{76}	—	October 11, 2006	Palomar	NEAT	·	2.1 km	MPC · JPL
440881	2006 TL_{91}	—	October 13, 2006	Kitt Peak	Spacewatch	·	2.0 km	MPC · JPL
440882	2006 TJ_{103}	—	October 15, 2006	Kitt Peak	Spacewatch	·	1.6 km	MPC · JPL
440883	2006 TX_{110}	—	October 1, 2006	Apache Point	A. C. Becker	AGN	1.1 km	MPC · JPL
440884	2006 TQ_{115}	—	October 1, 2006	Apache Point	A. C. Becker	·	2.5 km	MPC · JPL
440885	2006 TT_{124}	—	October 4, 2006	Mount Lemmon	Mount Lemmon Survey	·	1.9 km	MPC · JPL
440886	2006 US_{16}	—	October 17, 2006	Mount Lemmon	Mount Lemmon Survey	·	2.0 km	MPC · JPL
440887	2006 UV_{49}	—	September 30, 2006	Kitt Peak	Spacewatch	·	1.6 km	MPC · JPL
440888	2006 UA_{70}	—	September 30, 2006	Mount Lemmon	Mount Lemmon Survey	·	1.8 km	MPC · JPL
440889	2006 UL_{72}	—	October 17, 2006	Catalina	CSS	AEO	1.2 km	MPC · JPL
440890	2006 UO_{84}	—	October 17, 2006	Mount Lemmon	Mount Lemmon Survey	·	790 m	MPC · JPL
440891	2006 UM_{113}	—	September 18, 2006	Kitt Peak	Spacewatch	KOR	1.0 km	MPC · JPL
440892	2006 UE_{114}	—	September 19, 2006	Kitt Peak	Spacewatch	·	2.0 km	MPC · JPL
440893	2006 UE_{144}	—	October 19, 2006	Kitt Peak	Spacewatch	·	2.7 km	MPC · JPL
440894	2006 UM_{166}	—	October 21, 2006	Mount Lemmon	Mount Lemmon Survey	·	2.6 km	MPC · JPL
440895	2006 UL_{170}	—	October 21, 2006	Mount Lemmon	Mount Lemmon Survey	KOR	1.1 km	MPC · JPL
440896	2006 UN_{187}	—	September 17, 2006	Catalina	CSS	(18466)	2.4 km	MPC · JPL
440897	2006 UF_{221}	—	October 17, 2006	Catalina	CSS	DOR	2.5 km	MPC · JPL
440898	2006 UQ_{224}	—	October 19, 2006	Mount Lemmon	Mount Lemmon Survey	·	2.1 km	MPC · JPL
440899	2006 UU_{229}	—	October 21, 2006	Palomar	NEAT	·	1.8 km	MPC · JPL
440900	2006 UC_{283}	—	September 30, 2006	Mount Lemmon	Mount Lemmon Survey	·	1.5 km	MPC · JPL

== 440901–441000 ==
back to top

Designation			Discovery			Properties		Ref
Permanent	Provisional	Named after	Date	Site	Discoverer(s)	Category	Diam.	Ref
440901	2006 UJ_{288}	—	October 29, 2006	Catalina	CSS	DOR	2.9 km	MPC · JPL
440902	2006 UF_{337}	—	October 27, 2006	Mount Lemmon	Mount Lemmon Survey	·	3.4 km	MPC · JPL
440903	2006 UP_{345}	—	October 22, 2006	Mount Lemmon	Mount Lemmon Survey	·	3.7 km	MPC · JPL
440904	2006 VA	—	November 1, 2006	Mount Lemmon	Mount Lemmon Survey	·	840 m	MPC · JPL
440905	2006 VV_{1}	—	November 2, 2006	Kitt Peak	Spacewatch	·	1.8 km	MPC · JPL
440906	2006 VO_{6}	—	November 10, 2006	Kitt Peak	Spacewatch	·	2.9 km	MPC · JPL
440907	2006 VA_{35}	—	November 11, 2006	Mount Lemmon	Mount Lemmon Survey	·	590 m	MPC · JPL
440908	2006 VY_{56}	—	November 11, 2006	Kitt Peak	Spacewatch	·	530 m	MPC · JPL
440909	2006 VP_{63}	—	September 17, 2006	Kitt Peak	Spacewatch	·	2.0 km	MPC · JPL
440910	2006 VB_{72}	—	October 27, 2006	Mount Lemmon	Mount Lemmon Survey	·	1.8 km	MPC · JPL
440911	2006 VN_{77}	—	November 12, 2006	Mount Lemmon	Mount Lemmon Survey	VER	2.6 km	MPC · JPL
440912	2006 VZ_{79}	—	October 22, 2006	Mount Lemmon	Mount Lemmon Survey	·	3.1 km	MPC · JPL
440913	2006 VR_{81}	—	October 21, 2006	Mount Lemmon	Mount Lemmon Survey	·	2.1 km	MPC · JPL
440914	2006 VJ_{85}	—	November 13, 2006	Mount Lemmon	Mount Lemmon Survey	·	1.8 km	MPC · JPL
440915	2006 VK_{113}	—	September 28, 2006	Mount Lemmon	Mount Lemmon Survey	·	2.2 km	MPC · JPL
440916	2006 VD_{129}	—	November 15, 2006	Socorro	LINEAR	BRA	3.0 km	MPC · JPL
440917	2006 VM_{141}	—	November 13, 2006	Kitt Peak	Spacewatch	·	1.9 km	MPC · JPL
440918	2006 VH_{154}	—	October 21, 2006	Kitt Peak	Spacewatch	EOS	1.7 km	MPC · JPL
440919	2006 WG_{59}	—	November 17, 2006	Kitt Peak	Spacewatch	·	3.4 km	MPC · JPL
440920	2006 WF_{70}	—	November 18, 2006	Kitt Peak	Spacewatch	·	1.7 km	MPC · JPL
440921	2006 WO_{79}	—	November 18, 2006	Kitt Peak	Spacewatch	·	1.7 km	MPC · JPL
440922	2006 WO_{81}	—	November 18, 2006	Kitt Peak	Spacewatch	·	2.5 km	MPC · JPL
440923	2006 WF_{88}	—	October 23, 2006	Mount Lemmon	Mount Lemmon Survey	·	2.2 km	MPC · JPL
440924	2006 WT_{200}	—	November 22, 2006	Mount Lemmon	Mount Lemmon Survey	·	2.6 km	MPC · JPL
440925	2006 WO_{205}	—	November 24, 2006	Kitt Peak	Spacewatch	BRA	1.6 km	MPC · JPL
440926	2006 XM_{6}	—	September 27, 2006	Mount Lemmon	Mount Lemmon Survey	·	2.3 km	MPC · JPL
440927	2006 XY_{6}	—	November 26, 2006	Kitt Peak	Spacewatch	·	4.0 km	MPC · JPL
440928	2006 XE_{16}	—	November 27, 2006	Mount Lemmon	Mount Lemmon Survey	·	3.3 km	MPC · JPL
440929	2006 XD_{18}	—	December 10, 2006	Kitt Peak	Spacewatch	·	4.0 km	MPC · JPL
440930	2006 XA_{21}	—	December 11, 2006	Kitt Peak	Spacewatch	EOS	2.2 km	MPC · JPL
440931	2006 XK_{39}	—	December 11, 2006	Kitt Peak	Spacewatch	·	3.6 km	MPC · JPL
440932	2006 XE_{51}	—	December 13, 2006	Kitt Peak	Spacewatch	·	3.4 km	MPC · JPL
440933	2006 XG_{52}	—	November 22, 2006	Kitt Peak	Spacewatch	·	2.3 km	MPC · JPL
440934	2006 XB_{70}	—	November 27, 2006	Mount Lemmon	Mount Lemmon Survey	·	3.2 km	MPC · JPL
440935	2006 XP_{70}	—	December 15, 2006	Kitt Peak	Spacewatch	·	1.7 km	MPC · JPL
440936	2006 XB_{71}	—	December 13, 2006	Mount Lemmon	Mount Lemmon Survey	·	740 m	MPC · JPL
440937	2006 XW_{71}	—	December 1, 2006	Mount Lemmon	Mount Lemmon Survey	·	4.2 km	MPC · JPL
440938	2006 YE_{4}	—	November 27, 2006	Mount Lemmon	Mount Lemmon Survey	·	1.3 km	MPC · JPL
440939	2006 YA_{11}	—	December 13, 2006	Kitt Peak	Spacewatch	·	3.9 km	MPC · JPL
440940	2006 YG_{25}	—	December 21, 2006	Kitt Peak	Spacewatch	·	600 m	MPC · JPL
440941	2006 YO_{33}	—	December 21, 2006	Kitt Peak	Spacewatch	·	2.2 km	MPC · JPL
440942	2006 YK_{35}	—	December 21, 2006	Kitt Peak	Spacewatch	·	1.8 km	MPC · JPL
440943	2006 YE_{53}	—	December 20, 2006	Mount Lemmon	Mount Lemmon Survey	·	4.3 km	MPC · JPL
440944	2007 AH	—	January 8, 2007	Eskridge	G. Hug	·	4.3 km	MPC · JPL
440945	2007 AH_{5}	—	January 8, 2007	Mount Lemmon	Mount Lemmon Survey	·	570 m	MPC · JPL
440946	2007 AW_{6}	—	January 9, 2007	Kitt Peak	Spacewatch	·	4.4 km	MPC · JPL
440947	2007 AG_{19}	—	January 15, 2007	Anderson Mesa	LONEOS	·	4.4 km	MPC · JPL
440948	2007 AA_{26}	—	January 15, 2007	Catalina	CSS	·	5.0 km	MPC · JPL
440949	2007 AP_{28}	—	January 9, 2007	Mount Lemmon	Mount Lemmon Survey	·	2.6 km	MPC · JPL
440950	2007 AG_{31}	—	January 10, 2007	Kitt Peak	Spacewatch	EOS	2.7 km	MPC · JPL
440951	2007 BQ_{11}	—	January 17, 2007	Kitt Peak	Spacewatch	·	2.8 km	MPC · JPL
440952	2007 BX_{12}	—	November 27, 2006	Mount Lemmon	Mount Lemmon Survey	·	2.7 km	MPC · JPL
440953	2007 BH_{14}	—	January 17, 2007	Kitt Peak	Spacewatch	HYG	2.7 km	MPC · JPL
440954	2007 BF_{15}	—	January 17, 2007	Kitt Peak	Spacewatch	·	3.3 km	MPC · JPL
440955	2007 BH_{22}	—	December 26, 2006	Kitt Peak	Spacewatch	·	770 m	MPC · JPL
440956	2007 BV_{23}	—	January 17, 2007	Kitt Peak	Spacewatch	(31811)	2.6 km	MPC · JPL
440957	2007 BL_{27}	—	January 24, 2007	Catalina	CSS	·	4.9 km	MPC · JPL
440958	2007 BU_{27}	—	January 24, 2007	Mount Lemmon	Mount Lemmon Survey	EOS	1.6 km	MPC · JPL
440959	2007 BN_{32}	—	January 24, 2007	Mount Lemmon	Mount Lemmon Survey	EOS	2.0 km	MPC · JPL
440960	2007 BF_{36}	—	January 24, 2007	Mount Lemmon	Mount Lemmon Survey	·	910 m	MPC · JPL
440961	2007 BC_{45}	—	January 25, 2007	Kitt Peak	Spacewatch	·	750 m	MPC · JPL
440962	2007 BJ_{45}	—	December 27, 2006	Mount Lemmon	Mount Lemmon Survey	·	970 m	MPC · JPL
440963	2007 BN_{57}	—	November 21, 2006	Mount Lemmon	Mount Lemmon Survey	·	1.9 km	MPC · JPL
440964	2007 BG_{63}	—	November 16, 2006	Mount Lemmon	Mount Lemmon Survey	·	3.8 km	MPC · JPL
440965	2007 BZ_{70}	—	January 28, 2007	Mount Lemmon	Mount Lemmon Survey	·	3.3 km	MPC · JPL
440966	2007 BQ_{78}	—	January 26, 2007	Kitt Peak	Spacewatch	·	3.8 km	MPC · JPL
440967	2007 BV_{78}	—	January 27, 2007	Kitt Peak	Spacewatch	·	3.4 km	MPC · JPL
440968	2007 BG_{79}	—	January 27, 2007	Kitt Peak	Spacewatch	·	3.2 km	MPC · JPL
440969	2007 BR_{94}	—	January 19, 2007	Mauna Kea	Mauna Kea	·	2.9 km	MPC · JPL
440970	2007 BG_{102}	—	January 28, 2007	Kitt Peak	Spacewatch	·	3.6 km	MPC · JPL
440971	2007 CB_{3}	—	January 10, 2007	Mount Lemmon	Mount Lemmon Survey	·	3.2 km	MPC · JPL
440972	2007 CU_{7}	—	February 6, 2007	Kitt Peak	Spacewatch	·	690 m	MPC · JPL
440973	2007 CH_{8}	—	February 6, 2007	Kitt Peak	Spacewatch	(1118)	5.0 km	MPC · JPL
440974	2007 CX_{14}	—	January 29, 2007	Kitt Peak	Spacewatch	·	610 m	MPC · JPL
440975	2007 CY_{20}	—	February 6, 2007	Mount Lemmon	Mount Lemmon Survey	·	790 m	MPC · JPL
440976	2007 CV_{22}	—	January 10, 2007	Kitt Peak	Spacewatch	·	3.2 km	MPC · JPL
440977	2007 CL_{28}	—	January 27, 2007	Kitt Peak	Spacewatch	·	2.6 km	MPC · JPL
440978	2007 CP_{30}	—	February 6, 2007	Mount Lemmon	Mount Lemmon Survey	·	3.4 km	MPC · JPL
440979	2007 CN_{31}	—	February 6, 2007	Mount Lemmon	Mount Lemmon Survey	·	3.6 km	MPC · JPL
440980	2007 CQ_{36}	—	January 17, 2007	Kitt Peak	Spacewatch	HYG	2.3 km	MPC · JPL
440981	2007 CO_{37}	—	February 6, 2007	Mount Lemmon	Mount Lemmon Survey	·	2.7 km	MPC · JPL
440982	2007 CR_{37}	—	February 6, 2007	Mount Lemmon	Mount Lemmon Survey	EOS	1.9 km	MPC · JPL
440983	2007 CR_{42}	—	February 7, 2007	Mount Lemmon	Mount Lemmon Survey	EOS	1.6 km	MPC · JPL
440984	2007 CZ_{51}	—	September 12, 2005	Kitt Peak	Spacewatch	·	1.8 km	MPC · JPL
440985	2007 CS_{78}	—	February 6, 2007	Kitt Peak	Spacewatch	·	3.2 km	MPC · JPL
440986	2007 DX_{4}	—	February 17, 2007	Kitt Peak	Spacewatch	·	2.8 km	MPC · JPL
440987	2007 DH_{6}	—	February 17, 2007	Kitt Peak	Spacewatch	·	630 m	MPC · JPL
440988	2007 DJ_{6}	—	February 17, 2007	Socorro	LINEAR	PHO	1.3 km	MPC · JPL
440989	2007 DO_{10}	—	February 17, 2007	Kitt Peak	Spacewatch	·	4.4 km	MPC · JPL
440990	2007 DZ_{10}	—	February 17, 2007	Kitt Peak	Spacewatch	·	2.7 km	MPC · JPL
440991	2007 DH_{12}	—	February 16, 2007	Palomar	NEAT	·	3.7 km	MPC · JPL
440992	2007 DR_{17}	—	February 17, 2007	Kitt Peak	Spacewatch	·	1.0 km	MPC · JPL
440993	2007 DG_{18}	—	February 17, 2007	Kitt Peak	Spacewatch	·	3.2 km	MPC · JPL
440994	2007 DF_{27}	—	February 17, 2007	Kitt Peak	Spacewatch	·	880 m	MPC · JPL
440995	2007 DV_{31}	—	February 17, 2007	Kitt Peak	Spacewatch	·	3.0 km	MPC · JPL
440996	2007 DX_{33}	—	February 17, 2007	Kitt Peak	Spacewatch	·	4.1 km	MPC · JPL
440997	2007 DR_{35}	—	February 17, 2007	Kitt Peak	Spacewatch	·	2.6 km	MPC · JPL
440998	2007 DM_{40}	—	February 19, 2007	Mount Lemmon	Mount Lemmon Survey	·	1.8 km	MPC · JPL
440999	2007 DH_{42}	—	February 16, 2007	Palomar	NEAT	·	4.1 km	MPC · JPL
441000	2007 DT_{46}	—	November 18, 2006	Mount Lemmon	Mount Lemmon Survey	·	1.8 km	MPC · JPL

back to top

== Meaning of names ==
As minor planet discoveries are confirmed, they are given a permanent number by the IAU's Minor Planet Center (MPC), and the discoverers can then submit names for them, following the IAU's naming conventions. The list below concerns those minor planets in the specified number-range that have received names, and explains the meanings of those names.

Official naming citations of newly named small Solar System bodies are approved and published in a bulletin by IAU's Working Group for Small Bodies Nomenclature (WGSBN). Before May 2021, citations were published in MPC's Minor Planet Circulars for many decades. Recent citations can also be found on the JPL Small-Body Database (SBDB). Until his death in 2016, German astronomer Lutz D. Schmadel compiled these citations into the Dictionary of Minor Planet Names (DMP) and regularly updated the collection.

Based on Paul Herget's The Names of the Minor Planets, Schmadel also researched the unclear origin of numerous asteroids, most of which had been named prior to World War II. This article incorporates text from this source, which is in the public domain: SBDB New namings may only be added to this list below after official publication as the preannouncement of names is condemned. The WGSBN publishes a comprehensive guideline for the naming rules of non-cometary small Solar System bodies.

Named minor planet	Provisional	This minor planet was named for...	Ref · Catalog
440411 Piovani	2005 QS_{28}	Nicola Piovani (born 1946), an Italian light-classical musician and film score composer, who won the Academy Award for his score of the Italian movie Life Is Beautiful (original title: La vita è bella) in 1999.	IAU · 440411
440670 Bécassine	2005 YL_{4}	Bécassine, a French children's comic book character created by writer Jacqueline Rivière and artist Joseph Pinchon.	IAU · 440670
440794 Wytrzyszczak	2006 OO_{14}	Iwona Wytrzyszczak (b. 1953), a Polish astronomer.	IAU · 440794
440833 Kristenwalbolt	2006 RB_{116}	Kristen Walbolt (1970–2024), an American web producer and social media personality behind the NASA exoplanets thematic website and social accounts.	IAU · 440833
