= La vita è bella (disambiguation) =

La vita è bella is the original title of Life Is Beautiful, a 1997 Italian film.

La vita è bella, or a variant thereof, may also refer to:

- "La vita è bella" (song), the title song to the 1997 film
- La vita è bella, thee soundtrack album for the 1997 film; see Life Is Beautiful (soundtrack)
- La vita è bella (1979 film), or Жизнь прекрасна, a 1979 Italian–Soviet film

== See also ==
- Bella Vita (disambiguation)
- La Vie est Belle (disambiguation)
- Life is Beautiful (disambiguation)
