= Life Is Beautiful (disambiguation) =

Life Is Beautiful is a 1997 Italian film.

Life Is Beautiful may also refer to:

== Films ==
- Life Is Beautiful (1943 film), directed by Carlo Ludovico Bragaglia
- Life Is Beautiful (1979 film), Soviet film directed by Grigori Chukhrai
- Life Is Beautiful (1985 film), Yugoslav film
- Life Is Beautiful (1997 film), Italian film directed by Roberto Benigni
- Life Is Beautiful (2000 film), Indian Malayalam film directed by Fazil
- Life Is Beautiful (2012 film), Indian Telugu film directed by Sekhar Kammula
- Life Is Beautiful (2014 film), Indian Hindi film
- Life Is Beautiful (2022 film), South Korean film

== Television ==
- Life Is Beautiful (Singaporean TV series), a medical television series
- Life Is Beautiful (South Korean TV series), a family romance television series

== Music ==
- Life Is Beautiful Music & Art Festival, an annual event in Las Vegas, Nevada, US

=== Albums ===
- Life Is Beautiful (The Afters album) or the title song, 2013
- Life Is Beautiful (Chicago Poodle album) or the title song, 2014
- Life Is Beautiful (Larry June, 2 Chainz and the Alchemist album) or the title song, 2025
- Life Is Beautiful (Tony Bennett album) or the title song (see below), 1975
- Life Is Beautiful (soundtrack), from the Italian film, or the title song, "La vita è bella" (see below), 1997
- Life Is Beautiful, or the title song, by Press Play, 2009
- Life Is Beautiful, an EP by Monni, 2013

=== Songs ===
- "Life Is Beautiful" (Flow song), 2004
- "Life Is Beautiful" (Fred Astaire song), 1974; covered by Tony Bennett, 1975
- "Life Is Beautiful" (Sixx:A.M. song), 2007
- "Life Is Beautiful" (Vega4 song), 2006
- "La vita è bella" (song), from the Italian film Life Is Beautiful, 1997
- "Life Is Beautiful", an unreleased song by Lana Del Rey
- "Life Is Beautiful", by Lil Peep from Come Over When You're Sober, Pt. 2, 2018
- "Life Is Beautiful", by Raven-Symoné from This Is My Time, 2004
- "Life is Beautiful", a song from the video-game Deadly Premonition
- "Life is Beautiful Theme", a track by Sundar C. Babu from the soundtrack of the 2006 Indian film Chithiram Pesuthadi

== Other ==
- "Life Is Beautiful", first art show of Mr. Brainwash (Thierry Guetta) in Los Angeles

== See also ==
- It's a Beautiful Life (disambiguation)
- A Beautiful Life (disambiguation)
- Beautiful Life (disambiguation)
- La Vie est Belle (disambiguation), "Life is Beautiful" in French
- La vita è bella (disambiguation), "Life is Beautiful" in Italian
- Life is Wonderful (disambiguation)
- Yeh Zindagi Kitni Haseen Hai (lit. 'This Life is Beautiful'), a 1966 Indian Hindi-language film
