= Buona Vita (Gigi D'Alessio album) =

Compilation album by Gigi D'Alessio
- Released: 2003
- Label: RCA Records

Gigi D'Alessio chronology
Uno come te (2002)	Buona Vita (2003)	Quanti amori (2004)

Buona Vita is a 2003 compilation album of the best of early recordings by Gigi D'Alessio which sold half a million copies, and heralded his popular success. It was Alessio's first compilation album and included two new tracks. The album was more commercially successful than most of the tracks when first released and heralded further success a few months later with his next original album Quanti amori.

== Track listing ==
CD 1

1. La forza delle donne 5:03 (inedito)
2. Quel che resta del mio amore 4:47
3. Io che non vivo 5:18
4. Dove sei 4:21 (2003 version)
5. Come in un film 4:12 (2003 version)
6. Portami con te 4:24
7. Tutt'a vita cu 'tte 5:13
8. Non dirgli mai 4:14
9. Como suena el corazón 4:26 (2003 version)
10. L'anatroccolo sposato 4:43 (2003 version)
11. Quando la mia vita cambierà 4:31

CD 2

1. Una notte al telefono 5:10
2. Il cammino dell'età 4:27
3. Tu che ne sai 4:36
4. Mon amour 3:44 (2003 version)
5. Insieme a lei 5:18
6. Buongiorno 4:38
7. Miele 4:51
8. Sei importante 5:26
9. Un nuovo bacio (con Anna Tatangelo) 4:15
10. Non mollare mai 4:14
11. Buona vita 2:56 (inedito)
