= Belle vie =

Belle vie or variant may refer to:

- La Belle Vie (The Good Life), a 1962 song by Sacha Distel with French lyrics by Jean Broussolle
- La Belle Vie, a 1963 film shot at the Palace of Versailles
- La Belle Vie, a 1993 song by Les Rita Mitsouko from the album Système D
- La Belle Vie, a 2013 song by TF1 Musique from the album Forever Gentlemen
- La Belle Vie (Damien Sargue song), 2013 single by Damien Sargue

== See also ==
- La Vie est Belle (disambiguation)
- Bella Vita (disambiguation)
- Beautiful Life (disambiguation)
- Belleview (disambiguation)
- 美麗人生 (disambiguation)
