= It's a Beautiful Life =

It's a Beautiful Life may refer to:

== Film and TV ==
- "It's a Beautiful Life", with Yūta Hiraoka
- "It's a Beautiful Life", episode of Total Divas (season 4)

== Music ==
=== Albums ===
- It's a Beautiful Life (album), Freebass 2010
- It's a Beautiful Life, album by Mark Spiro 2012

=== Songs ===
- "It's a Beautiful Life", chorus of "Beautiful Life" (Ace of Base song)
- "It's a Beautiful Life", single by band The Mighty Wallop!, covered by 10,000 Maniacs on Music from the Motion Picture
- "It's a Beautiful Life", single by Joel Feeney from Joel Feeney and the Western Front
- "It's a Beautiful Life", single by Don McLean from Chain Lightning, Dominion and Greatest Hits – Live
- "It's a Beautiful Life", single by Kenny Rogers from Back to the Well, single charted at 23 in Canada
- "It's a Beautiful Life", song by Jpop vocalist Hironobu Kageyama from Super Survivor
- "It's a Beautiful Life", song by Shila Amzah from album 3 Suara, Shila Amzah discography
- "It's a Beautiful Life", song by dobro player Jerry Douglas written Ehm and Thorny from Slide Rule 1992

== See also ==
- Beautiful Life (disambiguation)
- A Beautiful Life (disambiguation)
- Life Is Beautiful (disambiguation)
- It's a Wonderful Life (disambiguation)
