= La Vie est Belle =

La Vie est Belle (Life is Beautiful) may refer to:

- La Vie est Belle (1956 film), a French film by Roger Pierre
- La Vie est Belle (1987 film), a Zairean (Congolese) film starring Congolese singer Papa Wemba
- Life Is Beautiful (1997 film), Italian title La vita è bella, an Italian film by Roberto Benigni
- "La Vie est Belle", a track on the album Mach 6 by MC Solaar

== See also ==
- Belle vie (disambiguation)
- Life Is Beautiful (disambiguation)
- La vita è bella (disambiguation)
