= Beautiful Life (Rick Astley album) =

Studio album by Rick Astley
- Released: 13 July 2018
- Recorded: 2017
- Genre: Pop; soul
- Length: 42:35
- Label: BMG
- Producer: Rick Astley

Rick Astley chronology
50 (2016)	Beautiful Life (2018)	The Best of Me (2019)

Singles from Beautiful Life
- 1. "Beautiful Life" Released: 1 June 2018; 2. "Empty Heart" Released: 6 July 2018; 3. "Try" Released: 23 August 2018; 4. "She Makes Me" Released: 9 November 2018

Professional ratings
Review scores
Source	Rating
The Independent	3/5 stars
The Sunday Times	3/5 stars

Beautiful Life is the eighth studio album by English singer and songwriter Rick Astley. It was released on 13 July 2018 by BMG. The album peaked at No. 6 on the UK Albums Chart.

== Background ==
On 1 June 2018, Astley posted a video on Twitter announcing his upcoming album Beautiful Life set for release on 20 July. Beautiful Life ended up being released earlier than previously said, with its release date on 13 July 2018. Talking about the album, Astley said, "In the midst of all this madness, I just went back into my little home studio because that's what I love to do. It's my refuge really. I was tinkering about with bits and pieces and before you know it, I was making a new record."

== Singles ==
"Beautiful Life" was released as the lead single from the album on 1 June 2018. "Empty Heart" was released as the second single from the album on 6 July 2018. "Try" was released as the third single from the album on 23 August 2018. "She Makes Me" was released as the fourth single from the album on 9 November 2018.

== Commercial performance ==
Beautiful Life debuted at No. 6 on the UK Albums Chart. It became Astley's fifth top-ten album in the United Kingdom. In Germany, the album debuted at No. 40 on the German Albums Chart. The album has also charted in Austria, Belgium and Switzerland.

It has sold 73,517 copies in the UK as of 2023.

== Track listing ==
All tracks are written by Rick Astley.

Beautiful Life track listing
No.	Title	Length
1.	"Beautiful Life"	3:43
2.	"Chance to Dance"	3:11
3.	"She Makes Me"	3:34
4.	"Shivers"	3:38
5.	"Last Night on Earth"	3:37
6.	"Every Corner"	3:24
7.	"I Need the Light"	3:05
8.	"Better Together"	3:12
9.	"Empty Heart"	4:14
10.	"Rise Up"	3:15
11.	"Try"	3:55
12.	"The Good Old Days"	3:47
Total length:		42:35

== Personnel ==
- Rick Astley – vocals, all instruments, producer
- Dawn Joseph – backing vocals (1, 5–12)
- Lauren Johnson – backing vocals (5, 8, 11, 12)
- Matthew Payne, Nicolas Jones, Connor Smither – brass (9)
- Dan Frampton – engineer, mixing
- Randy Merrill – mastering
- Rankin – photography, design

== Charts ==
Chart performance for Beautiful Life
Chart (2018)	Peak position
Austrian Albums (Ö3 Austria)	70
Belgian Albums (Ultratop Flanders)	84
Belgian Albums (Ultratop Wallonia)	171
German Albums (Offizielle Top 100)	40
Scottish Albums (OCC)	5
Spanish Albums (Promusicae)	36
Swiss Albums (Schweizer Hitparade)	44
UK Albums (OCC)	6
UK Independent Albums (OCC)	1

== Release history ==
Release history and formats for Beautiful Life
Country	Date	Label	Format
United Kingdom	13 July 2018	BMG	Digital download; CD; MC
