= Beautiful Life (Rick Astley song) =

Single by Rick Astley

from the album Beautiful Life
- Released: 1 June 2018
- Recorded: 2017
- Genre: Pop
- Length: 3:43
- Label: BMG
- Songwriter(s): Rick Astley
- Producer(s): Rick Astley

Rick Astley singles chronology
"Dance" (2016)	"Beautiful Life" (2018)	"Empty Heart" (2018)

Music video
- "Beautiful Life" on YouTube

"Beautiful Life" is a song by English singer and songwriter Rick Astley. It was released as a digital download in the United Kingdom on 1 June 2018 as the lead single from his eighth studio album Beautiful Life (2018). The song has charted in Belgium. The song was also written and produced by Astley.

In 2019, Astley recorded and released a "reimagined" version of the song for his album The Best of Me.

== Music video ==
A music video to accompany the release of "Beautiful Life" was first released onto YouTube on 5 July 2018 at a total length of two minutes and fifty-seven seconds. It features men and women of different ages, races and looks all dressed in black and white clothes singing and dancing to the song in the same room, along with Astley himself.

On 10 February 2023, the music video was remastered in 4K.

== Track listing ==
Digital download
No.	Title	Length
1.	"Beautiful Life"	3:43

Digital download – remixes
No.	Title	Length
1.	"Beautiful Life" (E.N.V remix edit)	3:31
2.	"Beautiful Life" (E.N.V club mix)	5:23

== Charts ==
Chart (2018)	Peak position
Belgium (Ultratip Bubbling Under Flanders)	19
Poland (Polish Airplay Top 100)	27

== Release history ==
Region	Date	Format	Label
United Kingdom	1 June 2018	Digital download	BMG
