= Bella Vita (disambiguation) =

Bella Vita is a song by DJ Antoine

Bella Vita or La Bella Vita may also refer to:

- La bella vita, a 1935 work by Alberto Moravia
- "Bella Vita" (David et Jonathan song), a 1987 song by David et Jonathan
- La bella vita, a 1994 Italian comedy drama film

== See also ==
- La vita è bella (disambiguation)
- Belle vie (disambiguation)
- Beautiful Life (disambiguation)
- 美麗人生 (disambiguation)
