= Life Is Beautiful (soundtrack) =

La vita è bella

Soundtrack album by Nicola Piovani
- Released: 1997
- Genre: Classical
- Label: Virgin Records America
- Producer: Nicola Piovani

Nicola Piovani chronology
The Impostor (1997)	La vita è bella (1997)	Acts of Justice (1998)

Professional ratings
Review scores
Source	Rating
SoundtrackNet	link

Life Is Beautiful is the original soundtrack album, on the Virgin Records America label, of the 1997 Academy Award-winning film Life Is Beautiful (original title: La vita è bella), starring Roberto Benigni (who won the Academy Award for Best Actor for his role as "Guido Orefice" in this film), Nicoletta Braschi and Giustino Durano. The original score was composed by Nicola Piovani, with the exception of a classical piece which figures prominently: the barcarolle "Belle nuit, ô nuit d'amour" by Jacques Offenbach.

The album won the Academy Award for Best Original Dramatic Score and was nominated for a Grammy Award in Best Instrumental Composition Written For A Motion Picture, Television Or Other Visual Media.

== Track listing ==
All tracks written by Nicola Piovani, except where noted.

No.	Title	Length
1.	"Buon Giorno Principessa"	3:29
2.	"La vita è bella"	2:46
3.	"Viva Giosuè"	1:19
4.	"Grand Hotel Valse"	1:57
5.	"La notte di favola"	2:32
6.	"La notte di fuga"	3:49
7.	"Le uova nel capello"	1:07
8.	"Grand Hotel Fox"	1:55
9.	"Il treno nel buio"	2:19
10.	"Arriva il carro armato"	1:04
11.	"Valse Larmoyante"	2:03
12.	"L'uovo di struzzo-danza etiope"	1:53
13.	"Krautentang"	2:46
14.	"Il gioco di Giosuè"	1:45
15.	"Barcarolle (Jacques Offenbach)"	3:54
16.	"Guido e Ferruccio"	2:26
17.	"Abbiamo vinto"	3:03
Total length:		40:07
