= The Voice Brasil season 10 =

The Voice Brasil
- Season 10
- Hosted by: Tiago Leifert (Blind auditions); André Marques (Knockouts onwards); Jeniffer Nascimento (Backstage)
- Coaches: Carlinhos Brown; Claudia Leitte; Iza; Lulu Santos; Michel Teló
- No. of contestants: 77 artists
- Winner: Giuliano Eriston
- Winning coach: Michel Teló
- Runner-up: Gustavo Matias

Release
- Original network: TV Globo; Multishow
- Original release: October 26 – December 23, 2021

Season chronology
- ← Previous; Season 9 Next → Season 11

The tenth season of The Voice Brasil, premieres on TV Globo on Tuesday, October 26, 2021, in the 10:30 / 9:30 p.m. (BRT / AMT) slot, immediately following the special re-airing of the telenovela Império (2014).

Claudia Leitte returned to the panel after a five-year hiatus, along with returning coaches Carlinhos Brown, Iza, Lulu Santos and Michel Teló, thus making it the first season to have five coaches.

The season introduced "The Comeback Stage", where artists eliminated from the Blind Auditions, Knockouts, and Battles are selected and coached by Teló to form his team that will ultimately join the main competition in the "Cross Battles" round (which made a return for the first time since season seven). However, this season's Cross Battles were pre-recorded and, as result, does not feature the public vote component. Instead, the winner is determined by the three coaches not involved in the Battle.

Giuliano Eriston was announced the winner of the season on December 23, 2021. This marked Michel Teló's sixth victory in seven seasons as a coach, the first artist that had a coach blocked in their blind audition (Claudia Leitte blocking Carlinhos Brown), & the first and only artist that chosen for the Comeback Stage went on to win the entire Brazilian season.

== Teams ==
Key

- Winner
- Runner-up
- Eliminated in the Live shows
- Stolen in the Remix
- Eliminated in the Cross Battles
- Eliminated in the Comeback Stage Battles
- Eliminated in the Battles
- Selected to participate in Comeback Stage
- Stolen in the Knockouts
- Eliminated in the Knockouts
- Withdrew

Coaches	Top 77 artists						
Carlinhos Brown							
Carlinhos Brown	Gustavo Matias	Nêgamanda	Lysa Ngaca	Ammora Alves	Cristiana de Paula	Serena	~~Léo Pinheiro~~
Carlinhos Brown	~~Thor Junior~~	Leticia Coutinho	Manú Rodrigues	Thais Pereira	Bia Cantão	Luama	Will Gordon
Carlinhos Brown	~~Marya Bravo~~	~~Milla Paz~~	~~Anna Júlia~~	Rodrigo Mello	Manu Semiguen		
Claudia Leitte							
Claudia Leitte	Bruno Fernandez	Danilo Moreno	Dielle Anjos	Wina	Ariane Zaine	Cibelle Hespanhol	Adriana
Claudia Leitte	Raphael Marrone	Andrielly Souza	Anna Clara	Belle Ayres	Belle Brito	Noug	Bruna Gonçalves
Claudia Leitte	Dayse Rosa	~~Edvania Sousa~~	~~Ana Luiza Postingher~~	Bianca Aragão	Letícia Alecrim		
Michel Teló							
Michel Teló	Giuliano Eriston	Fernanda de Lima	EuLá	Nyah	Júlia Rezende	Thór Junior	~~Criston Lucas~~
Michel Teló	~~Anna Júlia~~	Dida Larruscain	Bella Raiane	Edvania Souza	Érika Ribeiro	Fabiana Gomes	Honey
Michel Teló	Krishna Pennutt	Marya Bravo	Milla Paz	Pamela Yuri			
Iza							
Iza	Hugo Rafael	WD	Anna Júlia	Dona Preta	Criston Lucas	Luiza Dutra	Camila Marieta
Iza	Eduardo Vidal	Gleyssinho Samblack	Giovanna Rangel	Gustavinho	Isabella Carvalho	Jamily Diwlay	Rafa
Iza	~~Dida Larruscain~~	~~Fernanda de Lima~~	~~Honey~~	~~Krishna Pennutt~~	~~Andrielly Sousa~~	Igor Sarapuí	Vanessa Souto
Lulu Santos							
Lulu Santos	Gustavo Boná	Júlia Paz	Carlos Filho	Thais Piza	Bruno Rodriguez	Léo Pinheiro	Ana Luiza Postingher
Lulu Santos	Bárbara Nery	Taty Gomes	Alessandra San	Bia Trindade	Carol Fincatti	Natália Araújo	Yasmin Maria
Lulu Santos	~~EuLá~~	~~Giuliano Eriston~~	~~Nyah~~	~~Júlia Rezende~~	~~Luama~~	~~Jamily Diwlan~~	
Note: Italicized names are stolen artists (names struck through within former teams).

== Coaches and hosts ==
Coaches and Host of The Voice Brasil Season 12

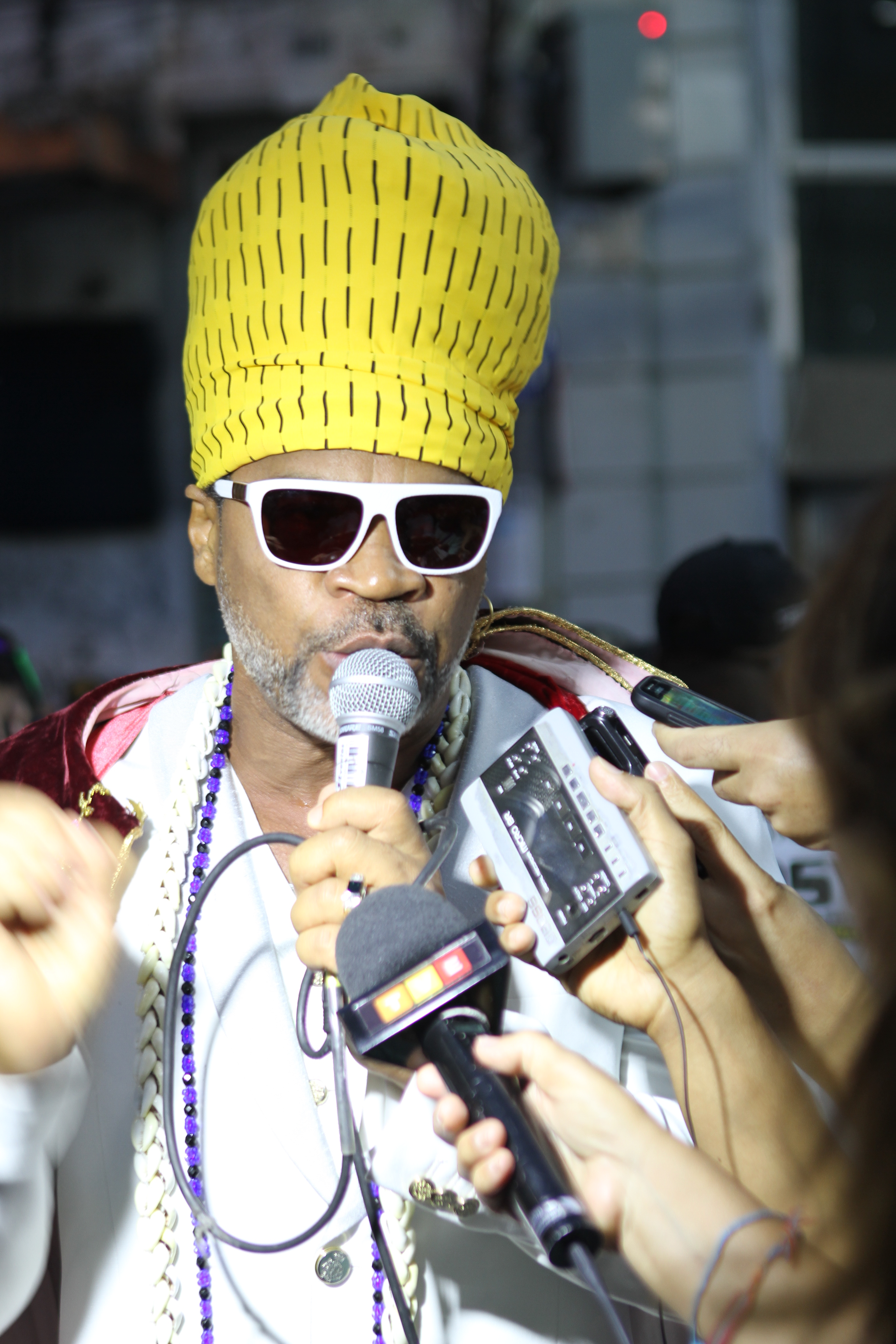
Carlinhos Brown

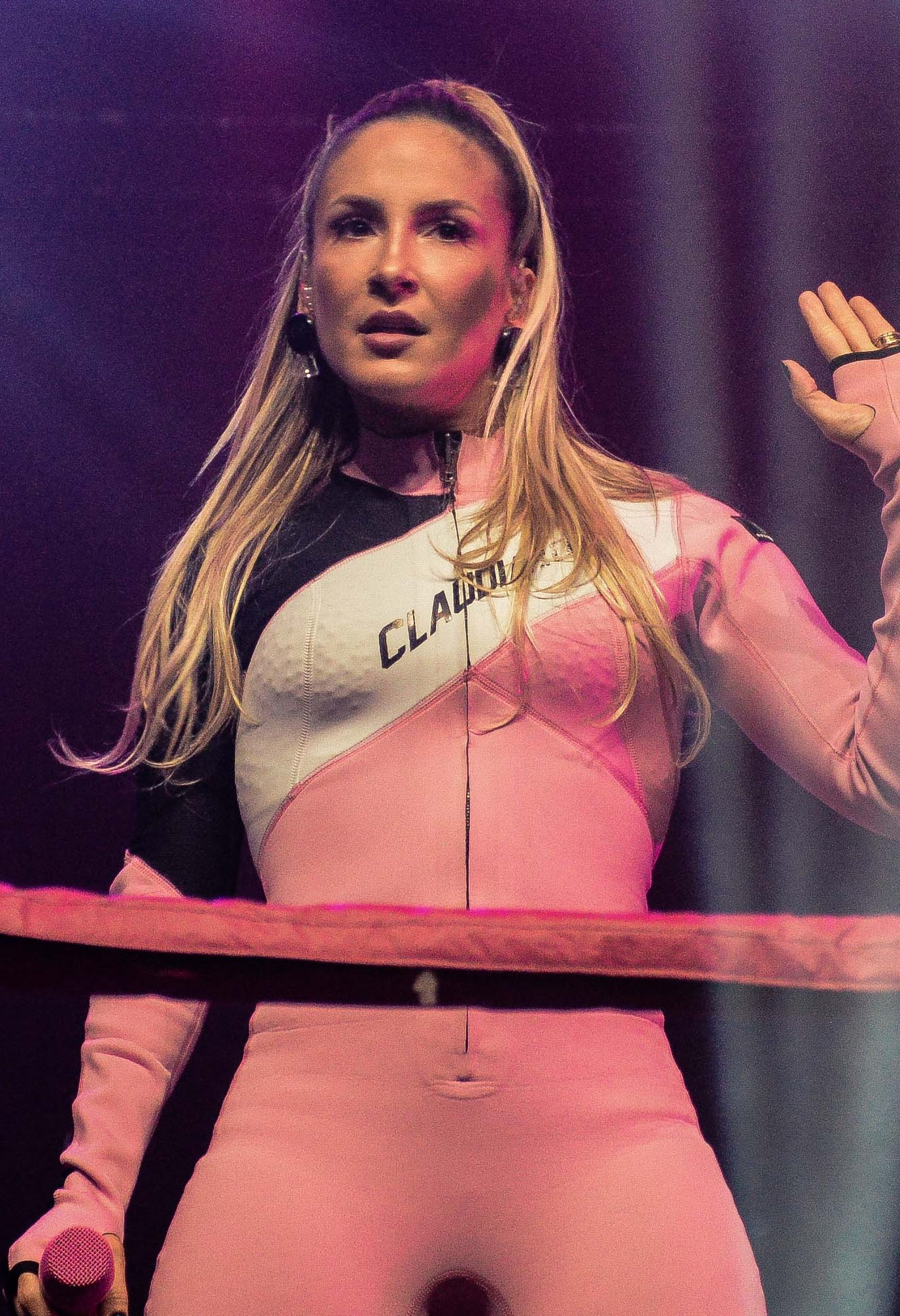
Claudia Leitte

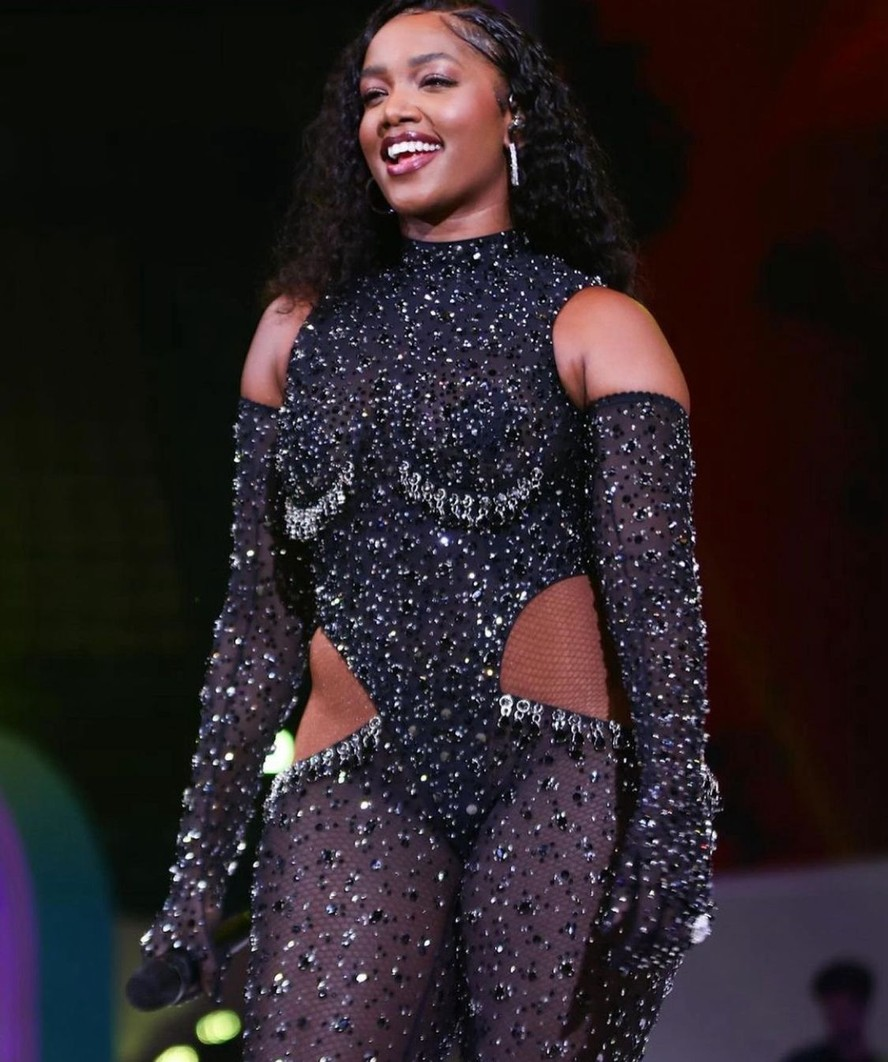
Iza

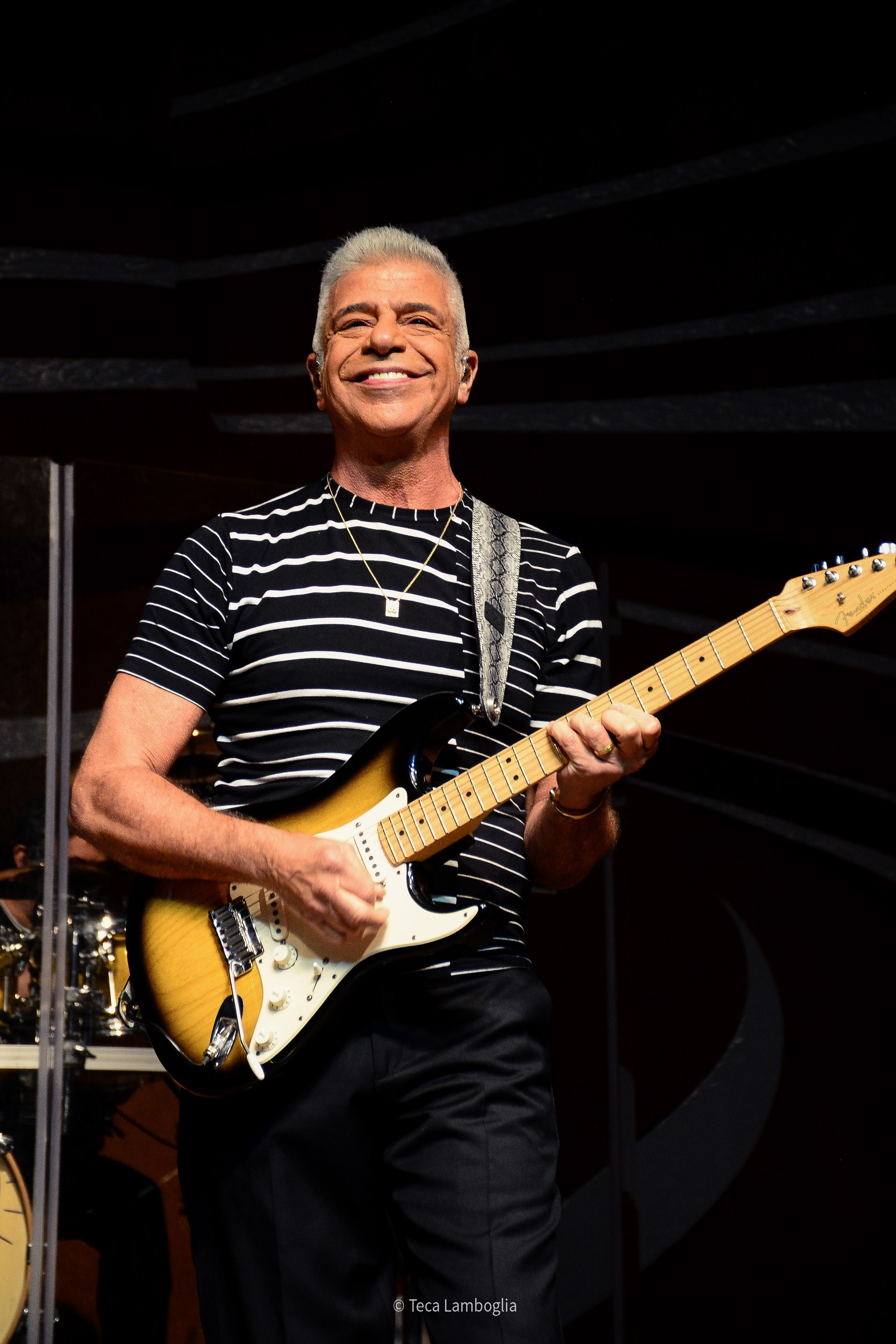
Lulu Santos

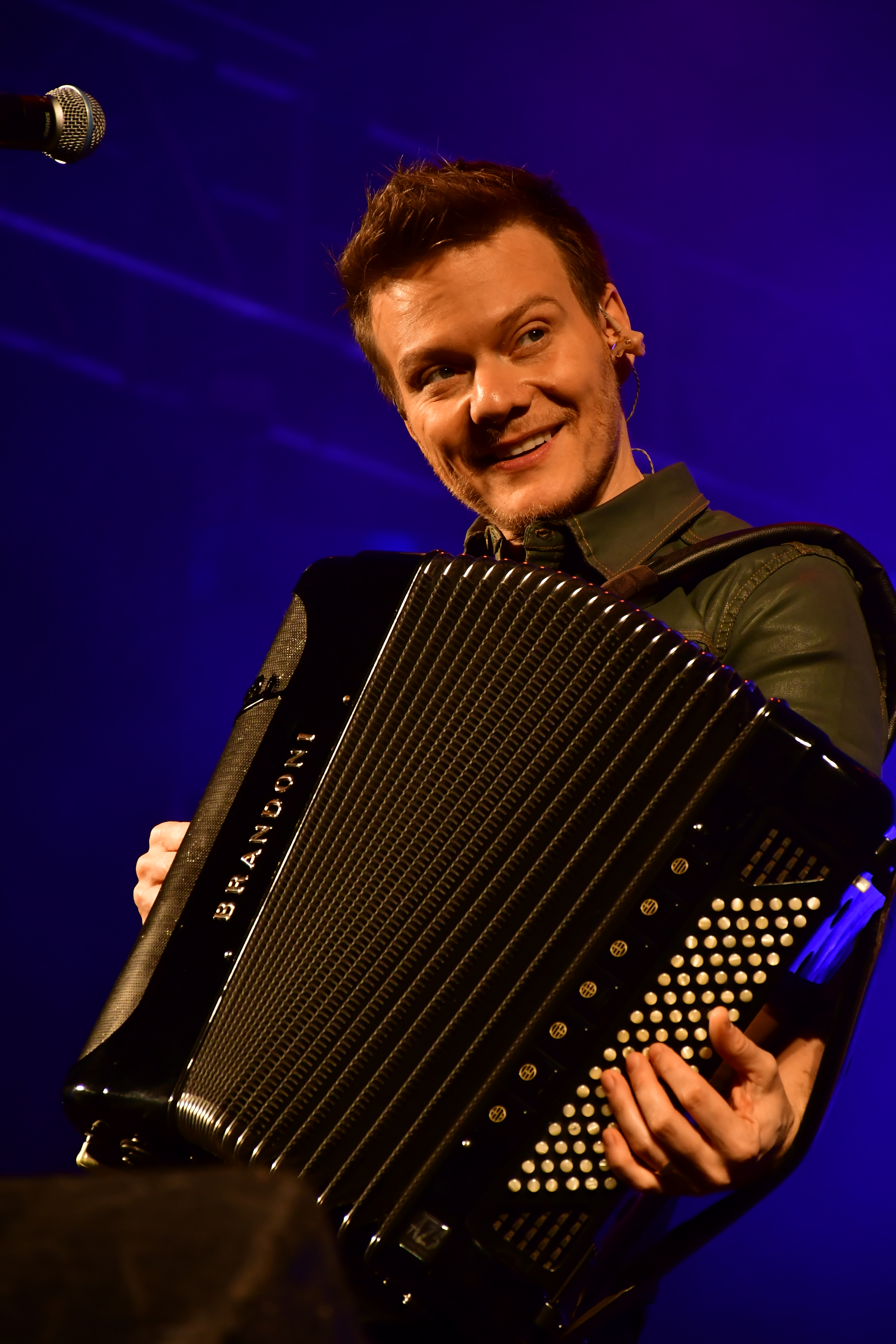
Michel Teló (Comeback Stage)

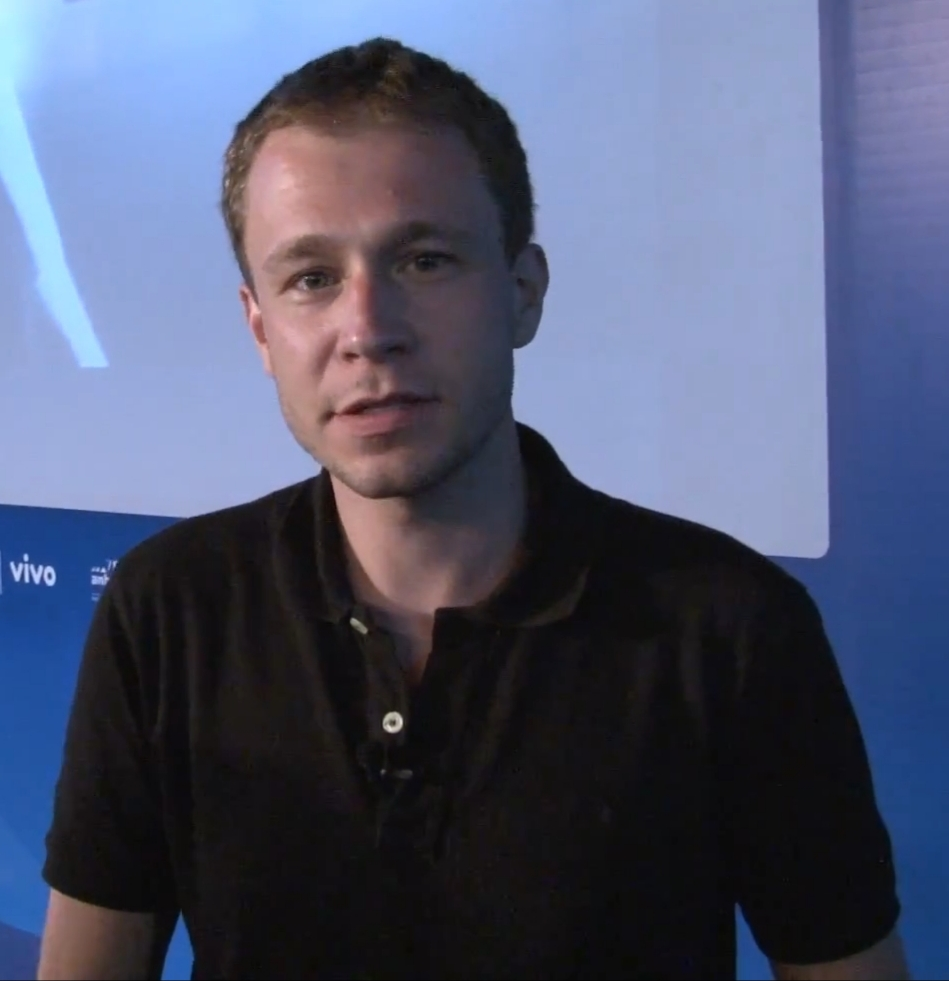
Tiago Leifert (host Blinds auditions)

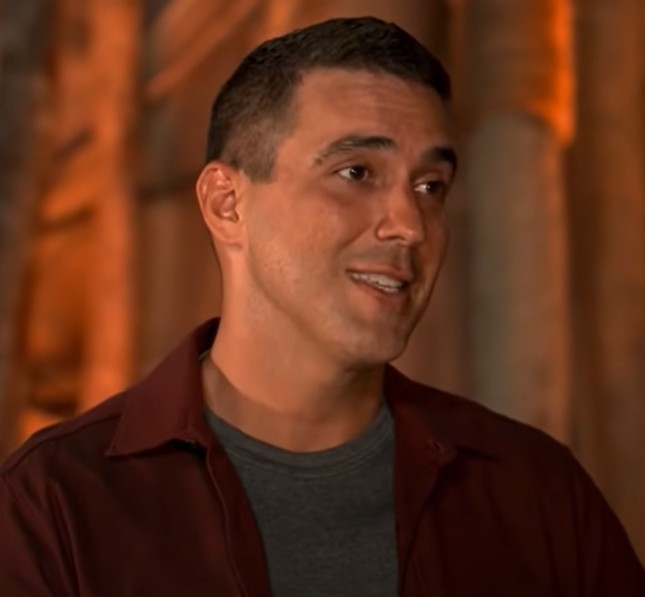
André Marques (host Knockouts onwards)

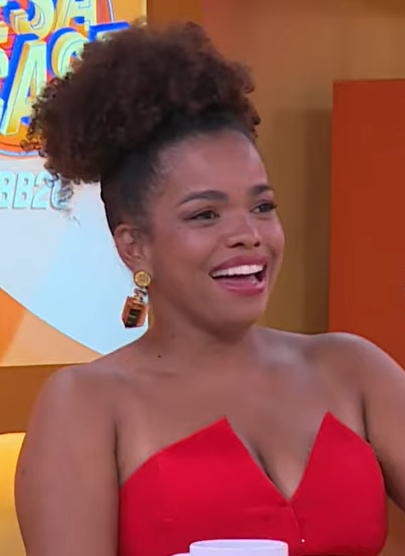
Jennifer Nascimento (Backstage)

== Blind Auditions ==
In the Blind auditions, each coach had to complete their teams with 18 contestants. Each coach had two Blocks to prevent another of the coaches from getting a contestant. Some participants who got no chair turn were chosen to participate in The Comeback Stage.

Blind auditions color key
✔	Coach pressed "I WANT YOU" button
	Artist defaulted to a coach's team
	Artist elected a coach's team
	Artist was eliminated and was not invited back for "The Comeback Stage"
	Artist was eliminated, but got a second chance to compete in "The Comeback Stage"
✘	Coach pressed "I WANT YOU" button, but was blocked by another coach from getting the artist
	Artist is an 'All Star' contestant
	Blocked by Brown; Blocked by Claudia; Blocked by Iza; Blocked by Lulu

Blind auditions results
Episode	Order	Artist	Age	Hometown	Song	Coach's and contestant's choices			
Episode	Order	Artist	Age	Hometown	Song	Brown	Claudia	Iza	Lulu
Episode 1 (Tuesday, October 26, 2021)	1	WD	28	Campinas	"Eu Sou"	✔	✔	✔	✔
Episode 1 (Tuesday, October 26, 2021)	2	Cristiane de Paula	43	Carangola	"Canta Brasil"	✔	-	-	-
Episode 1 (Tuesday, October 26, 2021)	3	Criston Lucas	27	Porto Velho	"Quem Sabe"	-	-	-	-
Episode 1 (Tuesday, October 26, 2021)	4	Carlos Filho	33	Serra Talhada	"Enquanto Engoma a Calça"	✔	✔	✔	✔
Episode 1 (Tuesday, October 26, 2021)	5	Edvania Sousa	22	Malacacheta	"Nuvem de Lágrimas"	✔	✔	-	✔
Episode 1 (Tuesday, October 26, 2021)	6	Hugo Rafael	35	Sorocaba	"A Song for You"	✔	✔	✔	✘
Episode 1 (Tuesday, October 26, 2021)	7	Lysa Ngaca	25	Luanda, Angola	"Quando A Chuva Passar"	✔	✔	✔	-
Episode 1 (Tuesday, October 26, 2021)	8	Dayse Rosa	31	Caruaru	"Onde Está Você?"	✔	✔	-	-
Episode 1 (Tuesday, October 26, 2021)	9	Letícia Drumond	26	Rio de Janeiro	"Malandro"	-	-	-	-
Episode 1 (Tuesday, October 26, 2021)	10	Léo Pinheiro	36	Paraíso do Tocantins	"Bar do Balacobaco"	✔	✔	✔	✔
Episode 1 (Tuesday, October 26, 2021)	11	Alessandra San	31	São Paulo	"You Oughta Know"	-	✔	-	✔
Episode 1 (Tuesday, October 26, 2021)	12	Eriem Beek	30	Florianópolis	"Supera"	-	-	-	-
Episode 1 (Tuesday, October 26, 2021)	13	Belle Ayres	26	Recife	"Flutua"	✔	✔	✘	✔
Episode 2 (Thursday, October 28)	1	Bruno Fernandez	29	Rio de Janeiro	"Estranha Loucura"	-	✔	✔	✔
Episode 2 (Thursday, October 28)	2	EuLá	30	Vitória da Conquista	"Céu Azul"	✔	✔	✔	✔
Episode 2 (Thursday, October 28)	3	Thais Pereira	22	Mauá	"I Wish"	✔	✔	✘	-
Episode 2 (Thursday, October 28)	4	Bella Raiane	22	João Pessoa	"Confidência"	-	-	-	-
Episode 2 (Thursday, October 28)	5	Gustavo Boná	24	Três Rios	"Céu de Santo Amaro"	-	-	-	✔
Episode 2 (Thursday, October 28)	6	Camila Marieta	24	Fortaleza	"Espumas ao Vento"	✔	✔	✔	✔
Episode 2 (Thursday, October 28)	7	Ammora Alves	24	Florianópolis	"I Put a Spell on You"	✔	✔	✔	✔
Episode 2 (Thursday, October 28)	8	Quei	25	Pombal	"Triste, Louca ou Má"	-	-	-	-
Episode 2 (Thursday, October 28)	9	Noug	24	Salvador	"Deixa Tudo Como Tá"	✔	✔	✔	-
Episode 2 (Thursday, October 28)	10	Giovanna Rangel	22	Bauru	"Don't You Worry 'bout a Thing"	✔	✔	✔	✔
Episode 2 (Thursday, October 28)	11	Marya Bravo	50	Rio de Janeiro	"Travessia"	✔	✔	-	-
Episode 2 (Thursday, October 28)	12	Giuliano Eriston	24	Bela Cruz	"A Rota do Indivíduo"	✘	✔	✔	✔
Episode 2 (Thursday, October 28)	13	Bruna Gonçalves	30	Bela Cruz	"Never Enough"	-	✔	-	-
Episode 2 (Thursday, October 28)	14	Dida Larruscain	26	Santa Maria	"Chovendo na Roseira"	✔	✔	✔	✔
Episode 2 (Thursday, October 28)	15	Fabiana Gomes	19	Inhumas	"Facas "	-	-	-	-
Episode 3 (Tuesday, November 2)	1	Manu Semiguen	28	Campo Mourão	"Something's Got a Hold on Me"	✔	✔	✔	✔
Episode 3 (Tuesday, November 2)	2	Taty Gomes	42	Ribeirão das Neves	"Joga Fora"	✔	-	✔	✔
Episode 3 (Tuesday, November 2)	3	Raphael Marrone	26	Guarabira	"Labios Compartidos"	✔	✔	✔	✔
Episode 3 (Tuesday, November 2)	4	Pamela Yuri	26	Maringá	"Lealdade Coragem Verdade"	-	-	-	-
Episode 3 (Tuesday, November 2)	5	Thais Piza	33	São Paulo	"Dressed for Success"	-	-	-	✔
Episode 3 (Tuesday, November 2)	6	Honey	26	Rio de Janeiro	"Toda Sua"	✔	-	✔	-
Episode 3 (Tuesday, November 2)	7	Nêgamanda	31	Itabuna	"Killing Me Softly with His Song"	✔	✔	✘	✔
Episode 3 (Tuesday, November 2)	8	Dielle Anjos	21	Guanambi	"Nem Tchum"	-	✔	-	-
Episode 3 (Tuesday, November 2)	9	Ariane Amorim	27	Itaú de Minas	"Romaria"	-	-	-	-
Episode 3 (Tuesday, November 2)	10	Bruno Rodriguez	26	Manaus	"Crazy"	-	✔	-	✔
Episode 3 (Tuesday, November 2)	11	Rafa	22	Belo Horizonte	"Um Amor Puro"	-	-	✔	-
Episode 3 (Tuesday, November 2)	12	Nyah	26	São Paulo	"Aquarius"	✔	✔	✔	✔
Episode 3 (Tuesday, November 2)	13	Will Gordon	27	São Paulo	"How Deep is Your Love"	✔	-	-	-
Episode 3 (Tuesday, November 2)	14	Lorrana Veras	22	Duque de Caxias	"Te Amar Demais"	-	-	-	-
Episode 3 (Tuesday, November 2)	15	Danilo Moreno	31	Salvador	"Muito Estranho"	✔	✔	-	✘
Episode 3 (Tuesday, November 2)	16	Gustavinho	20	São Gonçalo	"Já Tentei"	-	-	✔	✔
Episode 4 (Thursday, November 4)	1	Eduardo Vidal	26	Assis	"Superstition"	✔	✔	✔	✔
Episode 4 (Thursday, November 4)	2	Belle Brito	27	Tracunhaém	"Indestrutível"	-	✔	✔	✔
Episode 4 (Thursday, November 4)	3	Serena	26	Ilhabela	"Back to Black"	✔	✔	✔	✔
Episode 4 (Thursday, November 4)	4	Dona Preta	26	Itumbiara	"A Boba Fui Eu"	-	✔	✔	✔
Episode 4 (Thursday, November 4)	5	Bia Trindade	20	Cuiabá	"Put Your Records On"	-	-	✘	✔
Episode 4 (Thursday, November 4)	6	Érika Ribeiro	28	Iporá	"Sampa"	-	-	-	-
Episode 4 (Thursday, November 4)	7	Adriana	27	Salvador	"Quando Fui Chuva"	-	✔	-	-
Episode 4 (Thursday, November 4)	8	Leticia Coutinho	18	Salvador	"O Bêbado e a Equilibrista"	✔	-	-	✔
Episode 4 (Thursday, November 4)	9	Krishna Pennutt	28	Manaus	"Girassol"	✔	✔	✔	✔
Episode 4 (Thursday, November 4)	10	Matheus Torres	28	Extrema	"Heaven"	-	-	-	-
Episode 4 (Thursday, November 4)	11	Carol Fincatti	25	São Paulo	"Moon River"	-	-	✔	✔
Episode 4 (Thursday, November 4)	12	Gustavo Matias	22	Cruzeiro do Sul	"Nessun dorma"	✔	✔	-	-
Episode 4 (Thursday, November 4)	13	Isabella Carvalho	25	Rio de Janeiro	"Blues da Piedade"	Team full	✔	✔	-
Episode 4 (Thursday, November 4)	14	Lucas Martins	24	Nova Friburgo	"Final Feliz"	Team full	-	Team full	-
Episode 4 (Thursday, November 4)	15	Anna Clara	32	Mogi Guaçu	"I'm Gonna Getcha Good!"	Team full	✔	Team full	✔
Episode 4 (Thursday, November 4)	16	Bárbara Nery	28	Franca	"Amarelo, Azul e Branco"	Team full	Team full	Team full	✔

Note: At the end of the blind auditions, Iza did not use her second block.

=== Auditions not shown ===
Due to the large number of auditions (over 70) for just four episodes of blind auditions, TV Globo put some presentations available on the program's website, within the platform Gshow. In total, 24 auditions were not broadcast, six from each team.

Artist	Age	Hometown	Song	Coach
Jamily Diwaly	26	Salvador	"Redemption Song"	Lulu Santos
Luama	29	Três Rios	"Deus Me Proteja"	Lulu Santos
Júlia Rezende	22	Ipameri	"Nossa Conversa"	Lulu Santos
Júlia Paz	19	Sorriso	"Flagra"	Lulu Santos
Yasmin Maria	19	Remígio	"Hackearam-me"	Lulu Santos
Natália Araújo	28	Brasília	"Creep"	Lulu Santos
Letícia Alecrim	18	Belém	"Ai, Amor"	Claudia Leitte
Ariane Zaine	26	Guaratinguetá	"Eu Amo Você"	Claudia Leitte
Wina	23	São Paulo	"Sweet Dreams (Are Made of This)"	Claudia Leitte
Ana Luiza Postingher	25	Campo Grande	"Fim de Tarde"	Claudia Leitte
Bianca Aragão	25	Guaíra	"Rise Up"	Claudia Leitte
Cibelle Hespanhol	30	São Paulo	"Pense em Mim"	Claudia Leitte
Manú Rodrigues	27	Porteiras	"De Volta pro Aconchego"	Carlinhos Brown
Rodrigo Mello	38	Santos	"Photograph"	Carlinhos Brown
Anna Júlia	19	Goiânia	"Coração Bandido"	Carlinhos Brown
Thór Junior	37	Salvador	"Leave the Door Open"	Carlinhos Brown
Bia Cantão	28	Cametá	"Quero Você do Jeito Que Quiser"	Carlinhos Brown
Milla Paz	41	Paulista	"Mineira"	Carlinhos Brown
Andrielly Souza	23	Palmares	"Pesadão"	Iza
Igor Sarapuí	24	Rio de Janeiro	"Separação"	Iza
Luiza Dutra	22	Vitória	"Berimbau"	Iza
Fernanda de Lima	33	Araranguá	"Dangerous Woman"	Iza
Gleyssinho Samblack	42	Sete Lagoas	"Segundo Plano"	Iza
Vanessa Souto	18	Pedra Lavrada	"Dona Cila"	Iza

== Knockouts ==
For this phase, each coach selected six team members to sing in knockouts of two. Each coach was allowed to steal one losing artist from another coach, while the fifth coach, Teló, was able to steal two.

Knockouts color key
Artist won the Knockout and advanced to the Battles
Artist lost the Knockout but, was stolen by another coach, and advanced to the Battles
Artist lost the Knockout but was chosen for the Comeback Stage
Artist lost the Knockout and was eliminated

Knockouts results
Episode	Coach	Order	Winner		Loser		'Steal' result				
Episode	Coach	Order	Song	Artist	Artist	Song	Brown	Claudia	Iza	Lulu	Teló
Episode 5 (Tuesday, November 9)	Iza	1	"Madalena"	Luiza Dutra	Vanessa Souto	"Sina"	–	–	—N/a	–	–
Episode 5 (Tuesday, November 9)	Brown	2	"Cem Mil"	Bia Cantão	Anna Júlia	"Não Abro Mão"	—N/a	–	–	–	✔
Episode 5 (Tuesday, November 9)	Lulu	3	"Apenas Mais Uma de Amor"	Natália Araújo	Jamily Diwlay	"Vapor Barato"	–	–	✔	—N/a	✔️
Episode 5 (Tuesday, November 9)	Claudia	4	"Careless Whisper"	Wina	Ana Luiza Postingher	"Every Breath You Take"	–	—N/a	—N/a	✔	–
Episode 6 (Friday, November 12)	Iza	1	"Always Remember Us This Way"	Fernanda de Lima	Andrielly Souza	"Diamonds"	✔	✔	Team full	Team full	–
Episode 6 (Friday, November 12)	Brown	2	"Resposta ao Tempo"	Milla Paz	Manú Rodrigues	"Me Usa"	—N/a	Team full	Team full	Team full	–
Episode 6 (Friday, November 12)	Claudia	3	"Péssimo Negócio"	Cibelle Hespanhol	Letícia Alecrim	"Me Beija com Raiva"	–	Team full	Team full	Team full	–
Episode 6 (Friday, November 12)	Lulu	4	"Girls Just Want to Have Fun"	Júlia Paz	Luama	"Gostoso Demais"	✔	Team full	Team full	Team full	–
Episode 7 (Tuesday, November 16)	Brown	1	"Eu Te Devoro"	Rodrigo Mello	Thór Junior	"Você"	Team full	Team full	Team full	Team full	–
Episode 7 (Tuesday, November 16)	Claudia	2	"Baby 95"	Ariane Zaine	Bianca Aragão	"Bola de Sabão "	Team full	Team full	Team full	Team full	–
Episode 7 (Tuesday, November 16)	Iza	3	"Trovão"	Gleyssinho Samblack	Igor Sarapuí	"Deixa"	Team full	Team full	Team full	Team full	–
Episode 7 (Tuesday, November 16)	Lulu	4	"Cobaia"	Yasmin Maria	Júlia Rezende	"Dancing with the Devil"	Team full	Team full	Team full	Team full	✔

== Battles ==
For the battles round, each coach divides their artists in pairs to sing the same song. The 'steals' were removed for the first time this season, and only the fifth coach, Teló, could select eliminated artists to participate in the Comeback Stage. Contestants who win their battle advance to the Cross battles.

Battles color key
Artist won the Battle and advanced to the Cross battles
Artist lost the Battle but was chosen for the Comeback Stage
Artist lost the Battle and was eliminated

Battles results
Episode	Order	Coach	Winner	Song	Loser
Episode 8 (Thursday, November 18)	1	Iza	Hugo Rafael	"Beauty and the Beast"	Fernanda de Lima
Episode 8 (Thursday, November 18)	2	Claudia	Dielle Anjos	"Leão do Norte"	Dayse Rocha
Episode 8 (Thursday, November 18)	3	Lulu	Carlos Filho	"Sorri, Sou Rei"	EuLá
Episode 8 (Thursday, November 18)	4	Brown	Serena	"De Noite Na Cama"	Leticia Coutinho
Episode 8 (Thursday, November 18)	5	Claudia	Danilo Moreno	"Melhor Eu Ir"	Noug
Episode 8 (Thursday, November 18)	6	Lulu	Taty Gomes	"Bem Que Se Quis"	Carol Fincatti
Episode 8 (Thursday, November 18)	7	Brown	Léo Pinheiro	"Jack Soul Brasileiro"	Luama
Episode 8 (Thursday, November 18)	8	Iza	Luiza Dutra	"Serrado"	Dida Larruscain
Episode 9 (Tuesday, November 23)	1	Claudia	Bruno Fernandez	"Desafio"	Edvania Souza
Episode 9 (Tuesday, November 23)	2	Lulu	Thais Piza	"Prisoner"	Alessandra San
Episode 9 (Tuesday, November 23)	3	Brown	Nêgamanda	"Mas que Nada"	Milla Paz
Episode 9 (Tuesday, November 23)	4	Iza	Camila Marieta	"As Rosas Não Falam"	Rafa
Episode 9 (Tuesday, November 23)	5	Lulu	Bruno Rodriguez	"Tangerina"	Bia Trindade
Episode 9 (Tuesday, November 23)	6	Iza	Giovanna Rangel	"I Can't Help It"	Jamily Diwlay
Episode 9 (Tuesday, November 23)	7	Claudia	Adriana	"Tempos Modernos"	Belle Brito
Episode 9 (Tuesday, November 23)	8	Brown	Gustavo Matias	"The Prayer"	Marya Bravo
Episode 10 (Thursday, November 25)	1	Brown	Cristiane De Paula	"I Wanna Dance with Somebody"	Thais Pereira
Episode 10 (Thursday, November 25)	2	Lulu	Gustavo Boná	"Lamento Sertanejo"	Giuliano Eriston
Episode 10 (Thursday, November 25)	3	Claudia	Raphael Marrone	"Pra Você Acreditar"	Anna Clara
Episode 10 (Thursday, November 25)	4	Iza	WD	"Levitating"	Honey
Episode 10 (Thursday, November 25)	5	Lulu	Ana Luiza Postingher	"1 Minuto"	Yasmin Maria
Episode 10 (Thursday, November 25)	6	Brown	Ammora Alves	"Meu Talismã"	Bia Cantão
Episode 10 (Thursday, November 25)	7	Claudia	Ariane Zaine	"Stay"	Andrielly Souza
Episode 10 (Thursday, November 25)	8	Iza	Gleyssinho Samblack	"Me Olha Nos Olhos"	Gustavinho
Episode 11 (Tuesday, November 30)	1	Brown	Lysa Ngaca	"Chain of Fools"	Manu Semiguen
Episode 11 (Tuesday, November 30)	2	Claudia	Cibelle Hespanhol	"Luz dos Olhos"	Bruna Gonçalves
Episode 11 (Tuesday, November 30)	3	Iza	Dona Preta	"Várias Queixas"	Krishna Pennutt
Episode 11 (Tuesday, November 30)	4	Lulu	Júlia Paz	"Someone You Loved"	Natália Araújo
Episode 11 (Tuesday, November 30)	5	Claudia	Wina	"Beggin"	Belle Ayres
Episode 11 (Tuesday, November 30)	6	Iza	Eduardo Vidal	"Primavera (Vai Chuva)"	Isabella Carvalho
Episode 11 (Tuesday, November 30)	7	Brown	Thór Junior	"A Lua e Eu"	Will Gordon
Episode 11 (Tuesday, November 30)	8	Lulu	Bárbara Nery	"Hurt"	Nyah

== The Comeback Stage ==
This season's fifth coach, Michel Teló, had to select artists to form his team: five artists who did not make a team during the Blind auditions, two eliminated artists from the Knockouts, and ten from the Battles. Unlike other countries' Comeback Stages, this version has only one elimination round (the battles), to be broadcast exclusively on the network's website, Gshow. The intention is only to create an eight-member team to join the main competition for the Cross Battles (adding a fifth chair on the coaching panel), and compete to win the tenth season of The Voice Brasil just like a regular team.

Comeback Stage color key
Artist was chosen to advance
Artist was eliminated

Comeback Stage results
Aired in	Coach	Order	Winner	Loser(s)
Elimination battles (Wednesday, December 1)	Michel Teló	1	Fernanda de Lima	Marya Bravo
Elimination battles (Wednesday, December 1)	Michel Teló	2	Criston Lucas	Érika Ribeiro
Elimination battles (Wednesday, December 1)	Michel Teló	3	Giuliano Eriston	Milla Paz
Elimination battles (Wednesday, December 1)	Michel Teló	4	EuLá	Pamela Yuri
Elimination battles (Wednesday, December 1)	Michel Teló	5	Júlia Rezende	Fabiana Gomes
Elimination battles (Wednesday, December 1)	Michel Teló	6	Dida Larruscain	Edvania Souza
Elimination battles (Wednesday, December 1)	Michel Teló	6	Dida Larruscain	Krishna Pennutt
Elimination battles (Wednesday, December 1)	Michel Teló	7	Nyah	Honey
Elimination battles (Wednesday, December 1)	Michel Teló	8	Anna Júlia	Bella Raiane

== Cross Battles ==
For this round, coaches select an artist from their team, then challenge a fellow coach to compete against, and this coach selects an artist as well. The winner of the battle is decided by the three coaches not involved in the battle. Out of their eight team members, the coaches only chose four to participate in the phase, while the other four were sent automatically to the Remix. Coaches' names in bold means they were the challenger of the battle. Team Teló joins the main competition in this phase.

Cross battles color key
Artist won the Cross battle and advanced to the Remix
Artist lost the Cross battle and was eliminated

Cross battles results
Episode	Order	Coach	Artist	Song	Votes received (out of 3)	Result
Episode 12 (Thursday, December 2)	1	**Lulu**	Taty Gomes	"Vira Homem"	1	Eliminated
Episode 12 (Thursday, December 2)	1	Claudia	Ariane Zaine	"Love on the Brain"	2	Advanced
Episode 12 (Thursday, December 2)	2	Teló	Nyah	"Wicked Game"	3	Advanced
Episode 12 (Thursday, December 2)	2	**Iza**	Giovanna Rangel	"A Tua Voz"	0	Eliminated
Episode 12 (Thursday, December 2)	3	**Brown**	Léo Pinheiro	"Linha de Passe"	2	Advanced
Episode 12 (Thursday, December 2)	3	Iza	Gleyssinho Samblack	"Não Deixe o Samba Morrer"	1	Eliminated
Episode 12 (Thursday, December 2)	4	Lulu	Ana Luiza Postingher	"Go the Distance"	0	Eliminated
Episode 12 (Thursday, December 2)	4	**Teló**	EuLá	"Todo Homem"	3	Advanced
Episode 12 (Thursday, December 2)	5	**Claudia**	Adriana	"Mania De Você"	0	Eliminated
Episode 12 (Thursday, December 2)	5	Brown	Serena	"Correnteza"	3	Advanced
Episode 13 (Tuesday, December 7)	1	**Brown**	Cristiane De Paula	"Endless Love"	2	Advanced
Episode 13 (Tuesday, December 7)	1	Lulu	Bárbara Nery	"Não vá Embora"	1	Eliminated
Episode 13 (Tuesday, December 7)	2	**Claudia**	Dielle Anjos	"Encontros e Despedidas"	2	Advanced
Episode 13 (Tuesday, December 7)	2	Teló	Dida Larruscain	"Gente Humilde"	1	Eliminated
Episode 13 (Tuesday, December 7)	3	**Iza**	Eduardo Vidal	"I Feel Good"	1	Eliminated
Episode 13 (Tuesday, December 7)	3	Brown	Gustavo Matias	"Bohemian Rhapsody"	2	Advanced
Episode 13 (Tuesday, December 7)	4	**Lulu**	Carlos Filho	"Baby"	2	Advanced
Episode 13 (Tuesday, December 7)	4	Iza	Camila Marieta	"Alguém Me Disse"	1	Eliminated
Episode 13 (Tuesday, December 7)	5	**Teló**	Giuliano Eriston	"O Que É Amor?"	2	Advanced
Episode 13 (Tuesday, December 7)	5	Claudia	Raphael Marrone	"Anunciação"	1	Eliminated

== Remix ==
First, in this phase, each coach was able to automatically send three of their team artists to the live shows, as presented in the table below.

Automatically sent to the lives
Coach	Artists		
Carlinhos Brown	Gustavo Matias	Lysa Ngaca	Serena
Claudia Leitte	Cibelle Hespanhol	Ariane Zaine	Danilo Moreno
Michel Teló	EuLá	Giuliano Eriston	Júlia Rezende
Iza	Dona Preta	WD	Luiza Dutra
Lulu Santos	Carlos Filho	Gustavo Boná	Thais Piza

Then, the remaining artists performed for their coach, who could only choose two artists to continue on the team. By default, Lulu did not need to choose since he only had two artists remaining on his team, and Iza did not choose as well, because her team had only one artist remaining. The order of the coaches choosing their artists was set by the number of wins each coach had on the Cross Battles.

Remix color key
Artist was chosen by her/his coach to advance to the live shows
Artist was not chosen by her/his coach and was sent to Repechage

Remix results
Episode	Coach	Order	Artist	Song	Result
Episode 14 (Thursday, December 8)
Episode 14 (Thursday, December 8)	Brown	1	Ammora Alves	"Emotion"	Coach's choice
Episode 14 (Thursday, December 8)	Brown	2	Cristiane de Paula	"Bye Bye Tristeza"	Coach's choice
Episode 14 (Thursday, December 8)	Brown	3	Léo Pinheiro	"Tatá Engenho Novo"	Repechage
Episode 14 (Thursday, December 8)	Brown	4	Nêgamanda	"Valerie"	Repechage
Episode 14 (Thursday, December 8)	Brown	5	Thór Junior	"Meu Bem Querer"	Repechage
Episode 14 (Thursday, December 8)	Teló	6	Anna Júlia	"Amoreco"	Repechage
Episode 14 (Thursday, December 8)	Teló	7	Criston Lucas	"Será"	Repechage
Episode 14 (Thursday, December 8)	Teló	8	Fernanda de Lima	"Oceano"	Coach's choice
Episode 14 (Thursday, December 8)	Teló	9	Nyah	"Chandelier"	Coach's choice
Episode 14 (Thursday, December 8)	Claudia	10	Bruno Fernandez	"Você Me Vira A Cabeça (Me Tira do Sério)"	Coach's choice
Episode 14 (Thursday, December 8)	Claudia	11	Dielle Anjos	"Conto de Areia"	Coach's choice
Episode 14 (Thursday, December 8)	Claudia	12	Wina	"Another Brinck In The Wall"	Repechage
Episode 14 (Thursday, December 8)	Lulu	13	Bruno Rodriguez	"Suplicar"	Coach's choice
Episode 14 (Thursday, December 8)	Lulu	14	Júlia Paz	"I Will Survive"	Coach's choice
Episode 14 (Thursday, December 8)	Iza	15	Hugo Rafael	"What a Fool Believes"	Coach's choice

Finally, in the Repechage, the coaches had to finish their teams of six members. Brown, Claudia, Lulu, and Teló chose one artist to be on their teams, while Iza chose two. Again, the order of choosing was set by the number of wins on the Cross Battles.

Repechage color key
Artist chosen by Brown	Artist chosen by Claudia
Artist chosen by Teló	Artist chosen by Iza
Artist chosen by Lulu

Repechage results
Former coach	Artists		
Carlinhos Brown	Léo Pinheiro	Nêgamanda	Thór Júnior
Michel Teló	Anna Júlia	Criston Lucas	—N/a
Claudia Leitte	Wina	—	

== Live shows ==
Artist's info

- Team Brown
- Team Claudia
- Team Teló
- Team Iza
- Team Lulu

Result details

- Winner
- Runner-up
- Received the most points
- Saved by the public
- Eliminated but called to come back
- Withdrew due to COVID-19
- Eliminated

Performances and results per week
Artists	Quarter-finals		Semi-final	Final
Artists	Episode 15 (Tuesday, December 14)	Episode 16 (Thursday, December 16)	Episode 17 (Monday, December 20)	Episode 18 (Thursday, December 23)
Giuliano Eriston	—N/a	"Para Ver as Meninas"	"Sanfona Sentida" (64%)	"Luz do Sol"
Bruno Fernandez	"O Bem"	—N/a	"Nada Mais (Lately)" (65%)	"Me Dê Motivo"
Gustavo Matias	—N/a	"O Sole Mio"	"My Heart Will Go On" (83%)	"Ave Maria"
Gustavo Boná	—N/a	"Onde Deus Possa Me Ouvir"	"Avesso" (57%)	"Goodbye Yellow Brick Road"
Hugo Rafael	"Your Song"	—N/a	"My Love" (66%)	"Coleção"
Danilo Moreno	—N/a	"Envolvidão"	"Morena" (35%)	Eliminated (Semifinal)
Fernanda de Lima	"The Greatest Love of All"	—N/a	"When We Were Young" (36%)	Eliminated (Semifinal)
Júlia Paz	—N/a	"Uptown Funk"	"Do Seu Lado" (43%)	Eliminated (Semifinal)
Nêgamanda	"Fallin'"	—N/a	"Ilê Ayê (Que Bloco é Esse)" (17%)	Eliminated (Semifinal)
WD	—N/a	"Vozes"	"Believer" (34%)	Eliminated (Semifinal)
Carlos Filho	"Pavão Mysteriozo"	—N/a	Withdrew (Semifinal)	
Dielle Anjos	—N/a	"Explode Coração"	Withdrew (Semifinal)	
Lysa Ngaca	"Glory"	—N/a	Withdrew (Semifinal)	
Ammora Alves	—N/a	"Bete Balanço"	Eliminated (Quarterfinals, Thursday)	
Anna Júlia	—N/a	"De Quem é A Culpa?"	Eliminated (Quarterfinals, Thursday)	
Cristiane de Paula	—N/a	"O Amor e o Poder"	Eliminated (Quarterfinals, Thursday)	
Dona Preta	—N/a	"Tua"	Eliminated (Quarterfinals, Thursday)	
EuLá	—N/a	"Não Existe Amor em SP"	Eliminated (Quarterfinals, Thursday)	
Nyah	—N/a	"Like a Virgin"	Eliminated (Quarterfinals, Thursday)	
Thais Pisa	—N/a	"A Queda"	Eliminated (Quarterfinals, Thursday)	
Wina	—N/a	"Até Quando Esperar"	Eliminated (Quarterfinals, Thursday)	
Ariane Zaine	"Certas Coisas"	Eliminated (Quarterfinals, Tuesday)		
Bruno Rodriguez	"Billie Jean"	Eliminated (Quarterfinals, Tuesday)		
Cibelle Hespanhol	"Angel"	Eliminated (Quarterfinals, Tuesday)		
Criston Lucas	"Vinte Graus"	Eliminated (Quarterfinals, Tuesday)		
Júlia Rezende	"Melhor Sozinha"	Eliminated (Quarterfinals, Tuesday)		
Léo Pinheiro	"Refazenda"	Eliminated (Quarterfinals, Tuesday)		
Luiza Dutra	"Upa, Neguinho"	Eliminated (Quarterfinals, Tuesday)		
Serena	"Infiel"	Eliminated (Quarterfinals, Tuesday)		
Thór Junior	"O Portão"	Eliminated (Quarterfinals, Tuesday)		

== Ratings and reception ==
=== Brazilian ratings ===
All numbers are in points and provided by Kantar Ibope Media.

Episode	Title	Air date	Timeslot	SP viewers (in points)	Source
1	Blind Auditions 1	October 26, 2021	Tuesday 10:30 p.m.	18.5	
2	Blind Auditions 2	October 28, 2021	Thursday 10:30 p.m.	19.7	
3	Blind Auditions 3	November 2, 2021	Tuesday 10:30 p.m.	19.1	
4	Blind Auditions 4	November 4, 2021	Thursday 10:30 p.m.	18.9	
5	Knockouts 1	November 9, 2021	Tuesday 10:30 p.m.	14.0	
6	Knockouts 2	November 12, 2021	Friday 10:30 p.m.	15.6	
7	Knockouts 3	November 15, 2021	Monday 10:30 p.m.	15.6	
8	Battles 1	November 18, 2021	Thursday 10:30 p.m.	16.1	
9	Battles 2	November 23, 2021	Tuesday 10:30 p.m.	13.7	
10	Battles 3	November 25, 2021	Thursday 10:30 p.m.	13.7	
11	Battles 4	November 30, 2021	Tuesday 10:30 p.m.	15.7	
12	Cross Battles 1	December 2, 2021	Thursday 10:30 p.m.	13.6	
13	Cross Battles 2	December 7, 2021	Tuesday 10:30 p.m.	14.1	
14	Remix	December 8, 2021	Wednesday 10:30 p.m.	15.0	
15	Quarterfinals 1	December 14, 2021	Tuesday 10:30 p.m.	14.7	
16	Quarterfinals 2	December 16, 2020	Thursday 10:30 p.m.	15.0	
17	Semifinals	December 21, 2021	Tuesday 10:30 p.m.	16.6	
18	Finals	December 23, 2021	Thursday 10:30 p.m.	16.2	

- In 2021, each point represents 268.278 households in 15 market cities in Brazil (76.577 households in São Paulo).
