= The Voice Brasil season 11 =

The Voice Brasil
- Season 11
- Hosted by: Fátima Bernardes; Thaís Fersoza (Backstage)
- Coaches: Michel Teló; Iza; Gaby Amarantos; Lulu Santos
- No. of contestants: 48 artists
- Winner: Keilla Júnia
- Winning coach: Michel Teló
- Runners-up: Bell Lins; Juceir Jr; Mila Santana

Release
- Original network: TV Globo; Multishow
- Original release: November 15 – December 29, 2022

Season chronology
- ← Previous; Season 10 Next → Season 12

The eleventh season of The Voice Brasil, premiered on TV Globo on Tuesday, November 15, 2022, in the 10:30 / 9:30 p.m. (BRT / AMT) slot, immediately following the primetime telenovela Travessia.

Fátima Bernardes replaced André Marques as the main host, thus becoming the show's first and only female host. Thaís Fersoza (from The Voice +) replaced Jeniffer Nascimento as the show's backstage correspondent.

Lulu Santos, Michel Teló and Iza returned for their eleventh, eighth and fourth season as coaches, respectively, while Carlinhos Brown and Claudia Leitte were replaced by Gaby Amarantos.

On December 29, 2022, Keilla Júnia from Team Teló won the competition with 51.78% of the final vote over Bell Lins (Team Iza), Juceir Jr (Team Lulu) and Mila Santana (Team Gaby), marking Michel Teló's seventh and final victory in eight seasons as a coach. Also, with Michel Teló's win, he became the second most The Voice winning coach worldwide, behind Blake Shelton on the American version, with 8 wins (7 on the main version and once on the kids version).

== Teams ==
Key

Winner
Runner-up
Eliminated in the Live Semifinals

Stolen in the Remix
Eliminated in the Remix
Eliminated in the Cross Battles
Disqualified

Stolen in the Battles
Eliminated in the Battles
Stolen in the Showdowns
Eliminated in the Showdowns

Coaches	Top 48 artists					
Michel Teló						
Michel Teló	Keilla Júnia	Duda & Isa Amorim	Makem	~~Brenda Hellen~~	Analu	Júlio Mallaguthi
Michel Teló	~~Kacá Novais~~	Gisele de Santi	Neto & Felipe	Sá Biá	~~Déborah Castolline~~	~~Júlio Mallaguthi~~
Michel Teló	Camila Malkov	Elayne Tyne	Lua	Renan Bell		
Iza						
Iza	Bell Lins	Cesar Soares	Dgê	~~Fellipe Dias~~	Agatha Henriques	Bê Lourenço
Iza	Kacá Novais	~~Antonia Medeiros~~	Evy	Isis Mendonça	Victor & Gabih	~~Graziela Medori~~
Iza	~~Val Andrade~~	Emmily Pires	Evelyn Lima	Bete de Castro	Nathália Toste	
Gaby Amarantos						
Gaby Amarantos	Mila Santana	Fellipe Dias	Nath Audizio	Bela Portugal	~~Cesar Soares~~	Adri Amorim
Gaby Amarantos	Val Andrade	~~Analu~~	~~Brena Marinho~~	~~Júlio Mallaguthi~~	Hevelyn Costa	Adriana Bosaipo
Gaby Amarantos	Andreia Leal	Dandara Ruffier	Davi Lima	Marina Rosa	Nicole Carrion	
Lulu Santos						
Lulu Santos	Juceir Jr	Brenda Hellen	Juniô Castanha	Antonia Medeiros	Déborah Castolline	Mel Fernandes
Lulu Santos	Brena Marinho	~~Bela Portugal~~	~~Fellipe Dias~~	~~Nath Audizio~~	Graziela Medori	~~Gisele de Santi~~
Lulu Santos	~~Isis Mendonça~~	~~Kacá Novais~~	~~Victor & Gabih~~	Bruno Galvão	Camila Alexandre	
Note: Italicized names are stolen artists (names struck through within former teams).

== Coaches and hosts ==
Coaches and Host of The Voice Brasil Season 11

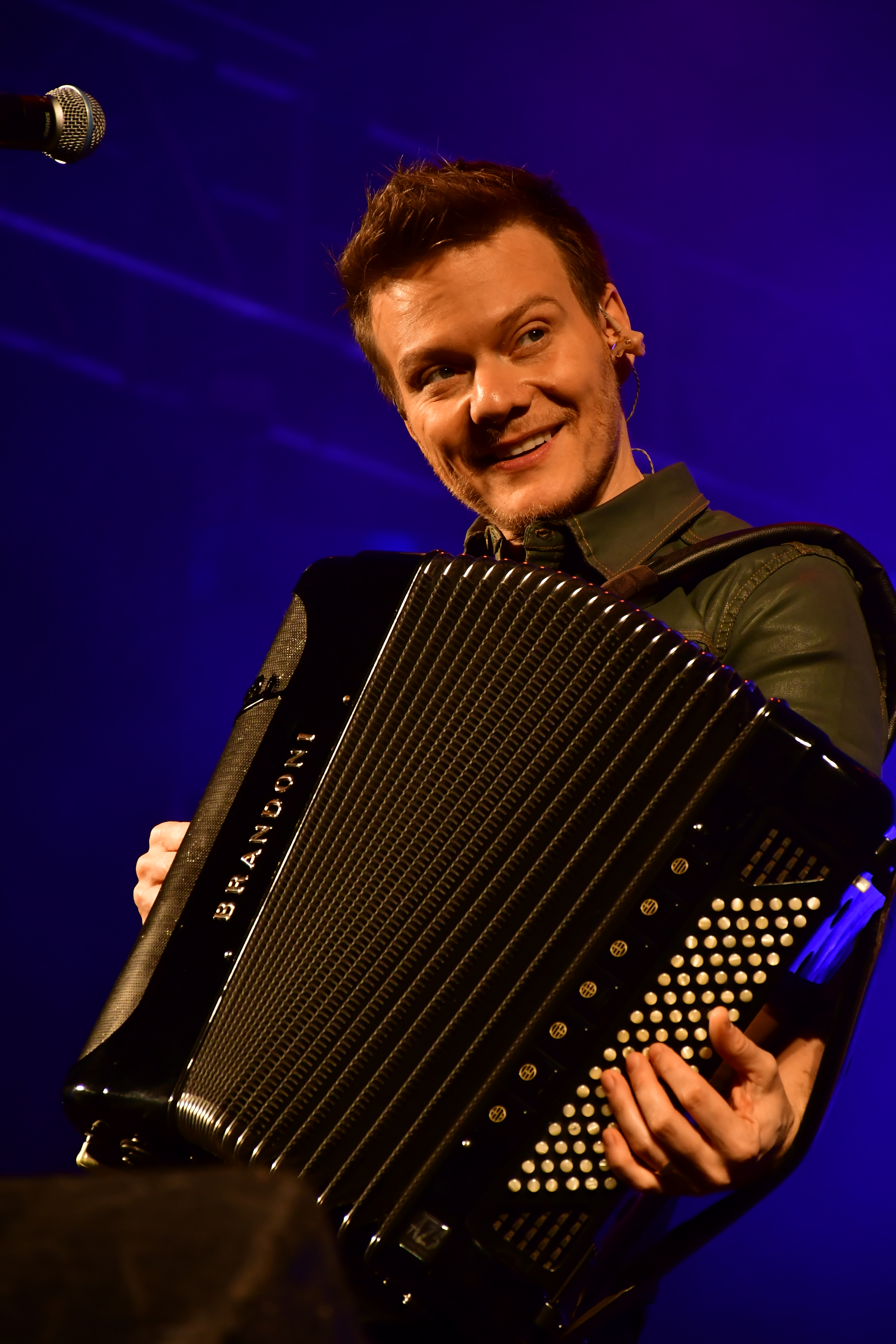
Michel Teló

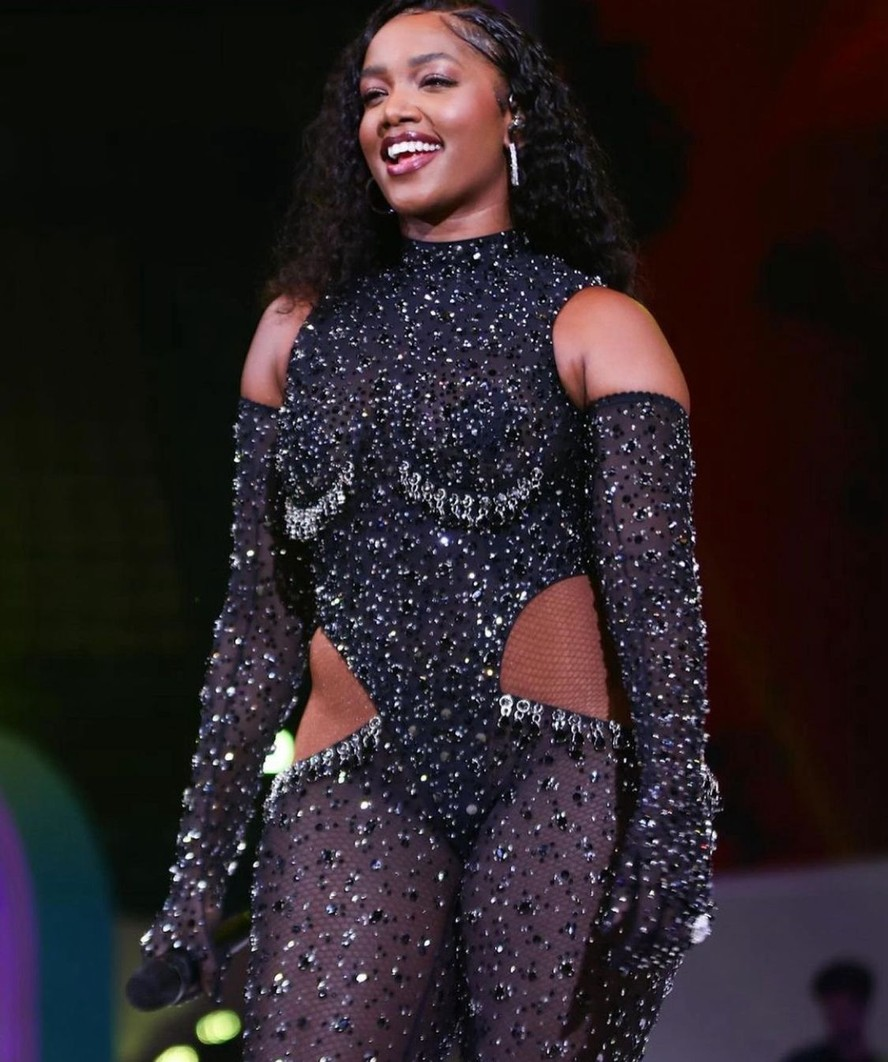
Iza

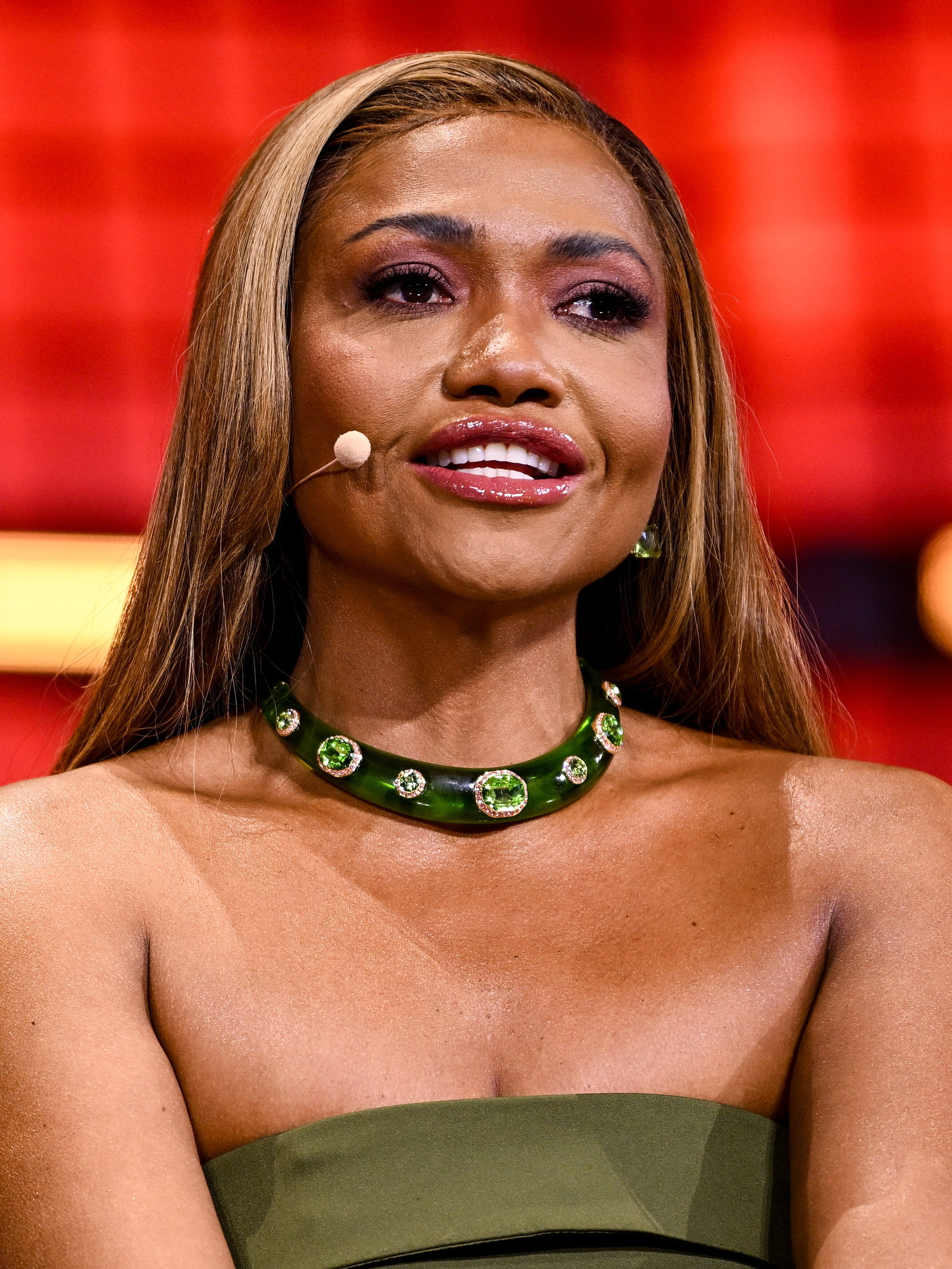
Gaby Amarantos

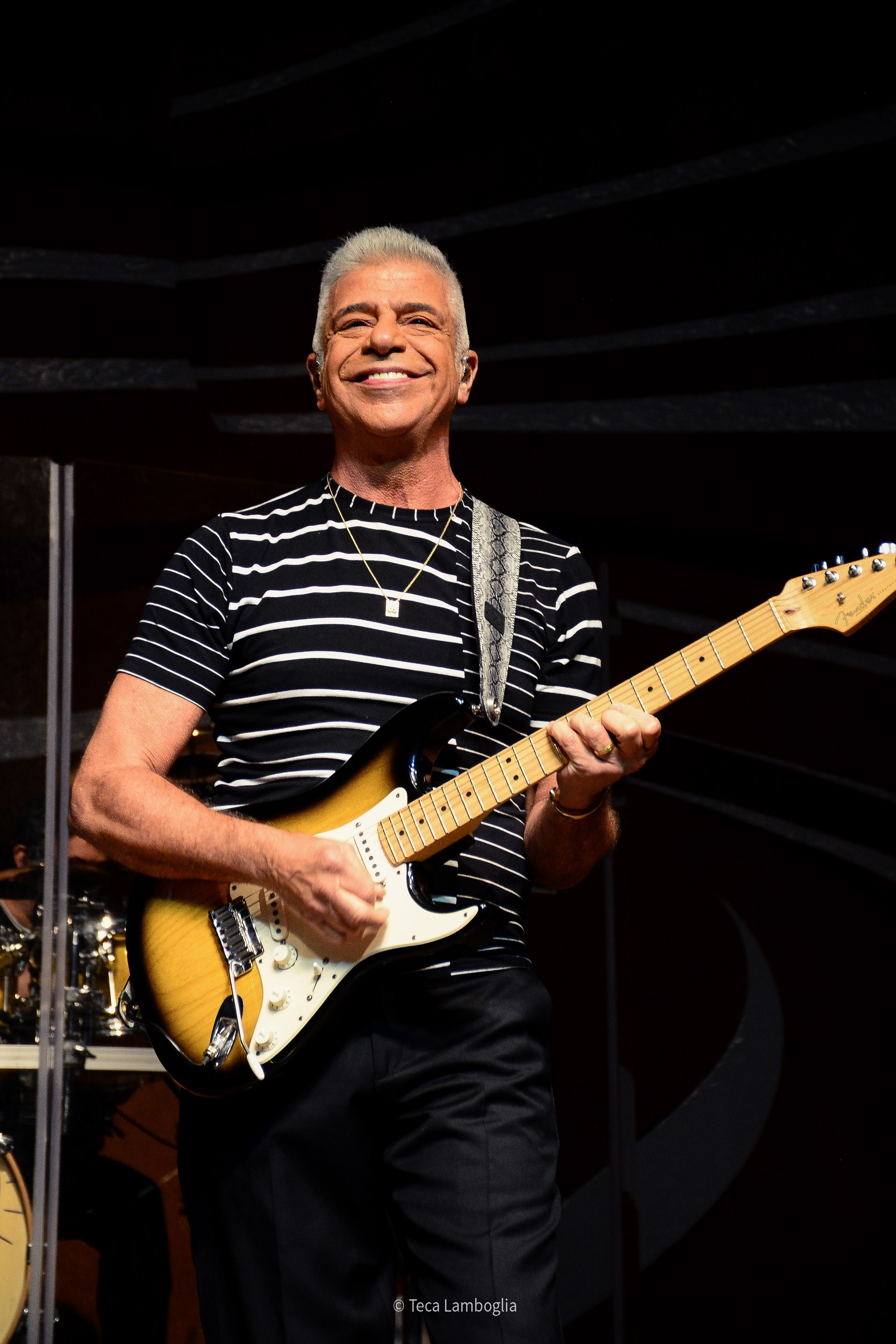
Lulu Santos

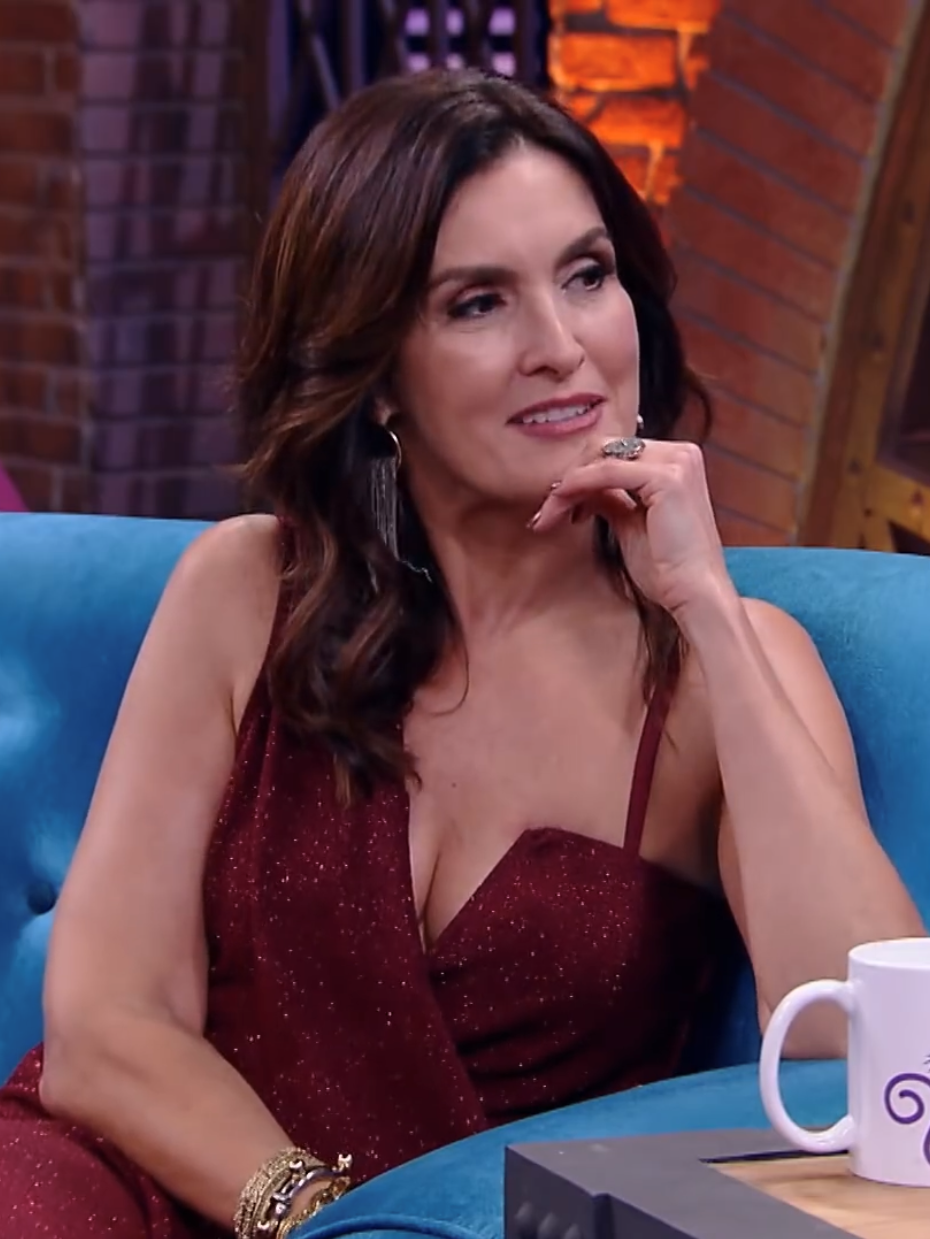
Fátima Bernardes (host)

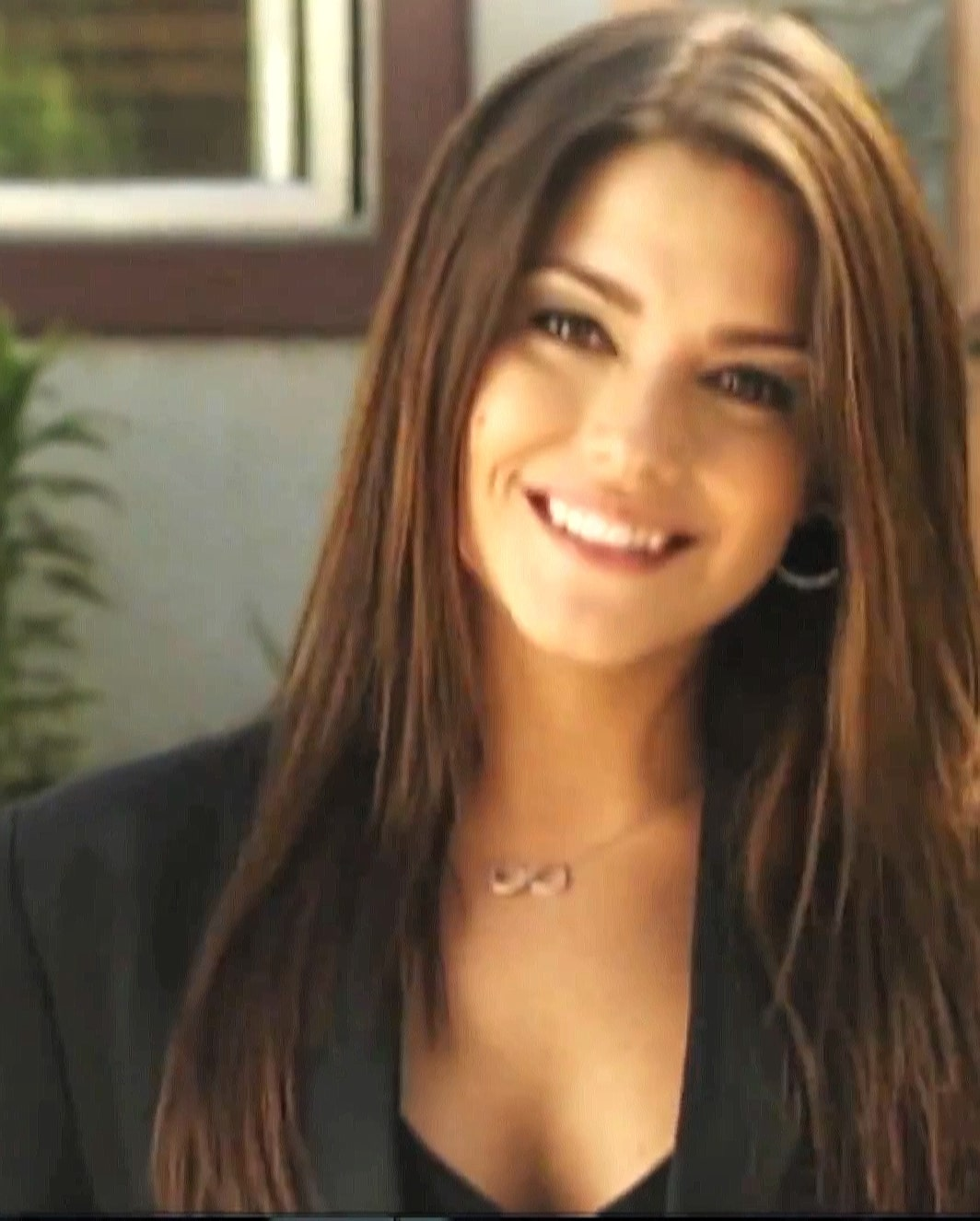
Thaís Fersoza (Backstage)

== Blind auditions ==
Key

✔	Coach pressed "I WANT YOU" button
	Artist defaulted to this coach's team
	Artist picked a coach's team
	Artist eliminated with no coach pressing their "I WANT YOU" button
	Artist is an 'All Star' contestant
✘	Coach pressed "I WANT YOU" button, but was blocked by another coach from getting the artist
	Blocked by Teló; Blocked by Iza; Blocked by Gaby; Blocked by Lulu

Blind auditions results
Episode	Order	Artist	Age	Hometown	Song	Coach's and contestant's choices			
Episode	Order	Artist	Age	Hometown	Song	Teló	Iza	Gaby	Lulu
Episode 1 (November 15, 2022)	1	Neto & Felipe	27–30	Jales	"O Cio da Terra"	✔	✔	✔	✔
Episode 1 (November 15, 2022)	2	Dgê	33	Rio de Janeiro	"De Quem é a Culpa?"	✔	✔	✔	–
Episode 1 (November 15, 2022)	3	Mila Santana	31	Simões Filho	"Don't Cry Baby"	✔	✘	✔	✔
Episode 1 (November 15, 2022)	4	Mel Fernandes	27	Curitiba	"Vilarejo"	–	–	–	✔
Episode 1 (November 15, 2022)	5	Makem	31	Fortaleza	"Tigresa"	✔	✔	✔	✔
Episode 1 (November 15, 2022)	6	Val Andrade	41	Caraguatatuba	"I Put a Spell on You"	✔	✔	✔	–
Episode 1 (November 15, 2022)	7	Amanda de Paula	25	Belém	"Poema"	–	–	–	–
Episode 1 (November 15, 2022)	8	Gisele de Santi	36	Porto Alegre	"Dindi"	✔	✔	✔	✔
Episode 1 (November 15, 2022)	9	Marina Rosa	36	Franca	"Clareou"	–	–	✔	–
Episode 1 (November 15, 2022)	10	Camila Malkov	32	Diadema	"Case-se Comigo"	✔	✔	✔	–
Episode 1 (November 15, 2022)	11	Bete de Castro	33	Recife	"Iracema"	–	✔	–	–
Episode 2 (November 17, 2022)	1	Keilla Júnia	18	Matozinhos	"Rise Up"	✔	✔	✔	✔
Episode 2 (November 17, 2022)	2	Bell Lins	22	Brasília	"Flamingos"	✔	✔	✔	✔
Episode 2 (November 17, 2022)	3	Brena Marinho	30	Cachoeiras de Macacu	"Menino das Laranjas"	✔	–	✔	–
Episode 2 (November 17, 2022)	4	Kacá Novais	35	Mogi das Cruzes	"Anima"	✔	✘	✔	✔
Episode 2 (November 17, 2022)	5	Duda & Isa Amorim	19–17	Timóteo	"Nuvem de Lágrimas"	✔	✔	✔	–
Episode 2 (November 17, 2022)	6	Nath Audizio	23	Rio de Janeiro	"Killing Me Softly with His Song"	✔	✔	✔	✔
Episode 2 (November 17, 2022)	7	Tony Nogueira	27	Ribeirão Preto	"Preciso Dizer que Te Amo"	–	–	–	–
Episode 2 (November 17, 2022)	8	Analu	22	Araxá	"Dengo"	✔	✔	✔	✔
Episode 2 (November 17, 2022)	9	Bruno Galvão	44	Rio de Janeiro	"Casaco Marrom (Bye, Baby, Cecy)"	–	–	–	✔
Episode 2 (November 17, 2022)	10	Evelyn Lima	32	Duque de Caxias	"Neither One of Us"	✔	✔	✔	✔
Episode 2 (November 17, 2022)	11	Emmily Pires	21	Aparecida	"Vida Vazia"	–	✔	✔	–
Episode 2 (November 17, 2022)	12	Adriana Bosaipo	34	São Luís	"Canto das Três Raças"	–	–	✔	–
Episode 2 (November 17, 2022)	13	Déborah Castolline	26	Porto Velho	"You Don't Do It for Me Anymore"	✔	✔	✔	✔
Episode 3 (November 22, 2022)	1	Antonia Medeiros	25	Rio de Janeiro	"Luiza"	✔	✔	✔	✔
Episode 3 (November 22, 2022)	2	Júlio Mallaguthi	34	Resende	"Pride and Joy"	✔	–	–	–
Episode 3 (November 22, 2022)	3	Fellipe Dias	28	Aracaju	"Das Estrelas"	✔	✘	✔	✔
Episode 3 (November 22, 2022)	4	Adri Amorim	29	Manaus	"Espiral de Ilusão"	–	–	✔	✔
Episode 3 (November 22, 2022)	5	Brenda Hellen	19	Salvador	"Hallelujah"	✔	✔	✔	✔
Episode 3 (November 22, 2022)	6	Graziela Medori	36	São Paulo	"Podres Poderes"	–	✔	–	–
Episode 3 (November 22, 2022)	7	Amanda Xavier	24	Mata de São João	"Eu Sei de Cor"	–	–	–	–
Episode 3 (November 22, 2022)	8	Victor & Gabih	29–29	Goiânia	"Também Não Sei de Nada :D"	✔	✔	✔	✔
Episode 3 (November 22, 2022)	9	Elayne Tyne	37	João Pessoa	"Volta, Me Abraça"	✔	–	–	–
Episode 3 (November 22, 2022)	10	Agatha Henriques	17	Aracaju	"Who's Lovin' You"	✔	✔	✔	✔
Episode 3 (November 22, 2022)	11	Cesar Soares	32	Niterói	"Ex Mai Love"	–	–	✔	–
Episode 3 (November 22, 2022)	12	Davi Lima	26	Salvador	"Sina"	✔	–	✔	–
Episode 3 (November 22, 2022)	13	Isis Mendonça	24	São Paulo	"Favorite Crime"	–	–	–	✔
Episode 3 (November 22, 2022)	14	Camila Alexandre	32	Lages	"Crazy"	✔	–	–	✔
Episode 4 (November 24, 2022)	1	Juniô Castanha	28	Recife	"Intimidade"	✔	✔	✘	✔
Episode 4 (November 24, 2022)	2	Evy	21	Rio de Janeiro	"(You Make Me Feel Like) A Natural Woman"	✔	✔	✔	–
Episode 4 (November 24, 2022)	3	Nicole Carrion	25	Santana do Livramento	"Volver a los Diecisiete"	✔	–	✔	✔
Episode 4 (November 24, 2022)	4	Bê Lourenço	28	São Paulo	"Malandro"	✔	✔	✔	–
Episode 4 (November 24, 2022)	5	Renan Bell	29	Joinville	"Piece of My Heart"	✔	–	✔	–
Episode 4 (November 24, 2022)	6	Bela Portugal	25	Belém	"No Time to Die"	✔	✔	–	✔
Episode 4 (November 24, 2022)	7	Gabriel Fernandes	20	Carmo	"Deixa Tudo Como Tá"	–	–	–	–
Episode 4 (November 24, 2022)	8	Hevelyn Costa	33	Sapucaia do Sul	"Passageiro"	–	–	✔	✔
Episode 4 (November 24, 2022)	9	Dandara Ruffier	32	Rio de Janeiro	"Chega de Saudade"	–	–	✔	–
Episode 4 (November 24, 2022)	10	Juceir Jr	32	Saquarema	"Quando Chove (Quanno Chiove)"	–	–	✔	✔
Episode 4 (November 24, 2022)	11	Nathália Toste	29	Cabo Frio	"A Tua Voz"	–	✔	✔	Team full
Episode 4 (November 24, 2022)	12	Sá Biá	25	Pelotas	"Gente Humilde"	✔	Team full	✔	Team full
Episode 4 (November 24, 2022)	13	Andreia Leal	25	Petrópolis	"No One"	–	Team full	✔	Team full
Episode 4 (November 24, 2022)	14	Lua	31	Jaboatão dos Guararapes	"Relampiano"	✔	Team full	Team full	Team full

Non-competition performances
Order	Performers	Song
1	Michel Teló, Iza, Gaby Amarantos, Lulu Santos.	"Divino Maravilhoso"

== Showdowns ==
The Showdowns was adapted from the second season of The Voice +. Coaches group their artists into three groups of four. In each group, two will advance to the Battles, while the remaining two can be stolen by the other coaches. Each coach can steal two losing artists from other teams.

Key

Artist won the Showdown and advanced to the Battles
Artist lost the Showdown but was stolen by another coach and advanced to the Battles
Artist was eliminated

Showdowns results
Episode	Coach	Order	Song	Artists		Song	Order	Steal result			
Episode	Coach	Order	Song	Winners	Losers	Song	Order	Teló	Iza	Gaby	Lulu
Episode 5 (November 29, 2022)	Gaby	1	"Vapor Barato / Flor da Pele"	Adri Amorim	Dandara Ruffier	"Valerie"	2	–	–	N/A	–
Episode 5 (November 29, 2022)	Gaby	4	"Água de Beber"	Mila Santana	Davi Lima	"Várias Queixas"	3	–	–	N/A	–
Episode 5 (November 29, 2022)	Lulu	5	"Falling"	Fellipe Dias	Kacá Novais	"Amor de Índio"	6	✔	–	–	N/A
Episode 5 (November 29, 2022)	Lulu	7	"Voltei Pra Mim"	Nath Audizio	Victor & Gabih	"Esotérico"	8	–	✔	–	N/A
Episode 5 (November 29, 2022)	Iza	9	"Cai Dentro"	Antonia Medeiros	Graziela Medori	"Canto de Ossanha"	11	–	N/A	–	✔
Episode 5 (November 29, 2022)	Iza	10	"Me Deixa em Paz"	Bê Lourenço	Nathália Toste	"Easy on Me"	12	–	N/A	–	–
Episode 5 (November 29, 2022)	Teló	13	"Quero Você Do Jeito Que Quiser"	Brenda Hellen	Camila Malkov	"A Lenda"	14	N/A	–	–	–
Episode 5 (November 29, 2022)	Teló	16	"Ovelha Negra"	Makem	Júlio Mallaguthi	"Cowboy Fora da Lei"	15	N/A	–	✔	–
Episode 6 (December 1, 2022)	Iza	1	"Meu Talismã"	Agatha Henriques	Bete de Castro	"Agora Tá"	2	–	N/A	–	–
Episode 6 (December 1, 2022)	Iza	3	"Samurai"	Evy	Val Andrade	"Run to You"	4	–	N/A	✔	✔
Episode 6 (December 1, 2022)	Lulu	5	"Não Quero Mais"	Bela Portugal	Gisele de Santi	"O Leãozinho"	6	✔	–	Team full	N/A
Episode 6 (December 1, 2022)	Lulu	8	"Tangerina"	Juniô Castanha	Isis Mendonça	"Flutua"	7	Team full	✔	Team full	N/A
Episode 6 (December 1, 2022)	Teló	10	"Fogão de Lenha"	Duda & Isa Amorim	Déborah Castolline	"Toxic"	9	Team full	Team full	Team full	✔
Episode 6 (December 1, 2022)	Teló	11	"Vou Voar (Rocket To The Moon)"	Keilla Júnia	Lua	"Retrato da Vida"	12	Team full	Team full	Team full	Team full
Episode 6 (December 1, 2022)	Gaby	13	"Baby 95"	Analu	Marina Rosa	"Jóia Rara"	15	Team full	Team full	Team full	Team full
Episode 6 (December 1, 2022)	Gaby	14	"Miss Celie's Blues"	Brena Marinho	Nicole Carrion	"As Canções Que Você Fez Pra Mim"	16	Team full	Team full	Team full	Team full
Episode 7 (December 6, 2022)	Iza	1	"Colors"	Bell Lins	Emmily Pires	"No Dia em Que Eu Saí de Casa"	3	Team full	Team full	Team full	Team full
Episode 7 (December 6, 2022)	Iza	2	"Deixo"	Dgê	Evelyn Lima	"Ainda Lembro"	4	Team full	Team full	Team full	Team full
Episode 7 (December 6, 2022)	Gaby	7	"Balada do Louco"	Cesar Soares	Adriana Bosaipo	"Ouricuri"	5	Team full	Team full	Team full	Team full
Episode 7 (December 6, 2022)	Gaby	8	"Certas Canções"	Hevelyn Costa	Andreia Leal	"Fim de Tarde"	6	Team full	Team full	Team full	Team full
Episode 7 (December 6, 2022)	Lulu	11	"Wherever You Will Go"	Juceir Jr	Bruno Galvão	"Casa"	9	Team full	Team full	Team full	Team full
Episode 7 (December 6, 2022)	Lulu	12	"Travessia"	Mel Fernandes	Camila Alexandre	"Nada Por Mim"	10	Team full	Team full	Team full	Team full
Episode 7 (December 6, 2022)	Teló	14	"The Sound of Silence"	Neto & Felipe	Elayne Tyne	"Gostoso Demais"	13	Team full	Team full	Team full	Team full
Episode 7 (December 6, 2022)	Teló	16	"Todo Homem"	Sá Biá	Renan Bell	"Puro Êxtase"	15	Team full	Team full	Team full	Team full

== Battles ==
For the Battles round, each coach divides their artists in pairs to sing the same song. The steals then returned this season, with two steals available for each coach. Contestants who win their battle, or stolen by another coach advance to the Cross Battles.

Key

Artist won the Battle and advanced to the Cross Battles
Artist lost the Battle but was stolen by another coach and advanced to the Cross Battles
Artist lost the Battle and was eliminated

Battles results
Episode	Coach	Order	Winner	Song	Loser	Steal result			
Episode	Coach	Order	Winner	Song	Loser	Teló	Iza	Gaby	Lulu
Episode 8 (December 8, 2022)	Iza	1	Bell Lins	"Earned It"	Isis Mendonça	–	N/A	–	–
Episode 8 (December 8, 2022)	Teló	2	Makem	"Rosa de Hiroshima"	Kacá Novais	N/A	✔	–	–
Episode 8 (December 8, 2022)	Gaby	3	Mila Santana	"Hit the Road Jack"	Brena Marinho	–	–	N/A	✔
Episode 8 (December 8, 2022)	Lulu	4	Juceir Jr	"Need You Now"	Bela Portugal	–	✔	✔	N/A
Episode 8 (December 8, 2022)	Iza	5	Bê Lourenço	"Madalena"	Antonia Medeiros	–	N/A	–	✔
Episode 8 (December 8, 2022)	Lulu	6	Juniô Castanha	"I Will Survive"	Fellipe Dias	✔	✔	–	Team full
Episode 8 (December 8, 2022)	Gaby	7	Adri Amorim	"A Sua"	Hevelyn Costa	–	Team full	N/A	Team full
Episode 8 (December 8, 2022)	Teló	8	Keilla Júnia	"Amor Perfeito"	Gisele de Santi	N/A	Team full	–	Team full
Episode 9 (December 13, 2022)	Gaby	1	Val Andrade	"We've Got Tonite"	Júlio Mallaguthi	✔	Team full	N/A	Team full
Episode 9 (December 13, 2022)	Teló	2	Duda & Isa Amorim	"Estrada da Vida"	Neto & Felipe	N/A	Team full	–	Team full
Episode 9 (December 13, 2022)	Lulu	3	Mel Fernandes	"Um Dia, Um Adeus"	Graziela Medori	–	Team full	–	Team full
Episode 9 (December 13, 2022)	Iza	4	Agatha Henriques	"Fall in Line"	Evy	–	Team full	–	Team full
Episode 9 (December 13, 2022)	Lulu	5	Déborah Castolline	"Sobrevivi"	Nath Audizio	–	Team full	✔	Team full
Episode 9 (December 13, 2022)	Teló	6	Brenda Helen	"Make You Feel My Love"	Sá Biá	N/A	Team full	Team full	Team full
Episode 9 (December 13, 2022)	Gaby	7	Cesar Soares	"Nós"	Analu	✔	Team full	Team full	Team full
Episode 9 (December 13, 2022)	Iza	8	Dgê	"Boa Sorte/Good Luck"	Victor & Gabih	Team full	Team full	Team full	Team full

== Cross Battles ==
For the Cross Battles round, coaches selected an artist from their team, then challenged a fellow coach to compete against, and this coach selected an artist as well. The winner of each Cross battle is decided in consensus by the two coaches not involved in the battle. Coaches' names in bold means they were the challenger of the battle. In addition, 8 artists (2 per team) were given a "fast pass" by their coaches, while the remaining 16 competed for 8 spots in the Remix round.

Fast passes
**Michel Teló**	**Iza**	**Gaby Amarantos**	**Lulu Santos**
Keilla Júnia	Dgê	Mila Santana	Antonia Medeiros
Makem	Bell Lins	Cesar Soares	Déborah Castolline

Key

Artist won the Cross Battle and advanced to the Remix
Artist lost the Cross Battle and was eliminated
Artist was disqualified

Cross battles results
Episode	Coach	Order	Artist	Song	Result
Episode 10 (December 15, 2022)	**Iza**	1	Fellipe Dias	"You and I"	Advanced
Episode 10 (December 15, 2022)	Michel Teló	1	Júlio Mallaguthi	"Metamorfose Ambulante"	Eliminated
Episode 10 (December 15, 2022)	**Lulu Santos**	2	Juceir Jr	"Imbranato"	Advanced
Episode 10 (December 15, 2022)	Iza	2	Kacá Novais	"À Primeira Vista"	Eliminated
Episode 10 (December 15, 2022)	**Michel Teló**	3	Brenda Helen	"Redemption Song"	Advanced
Episode 10 (December 15, 2022)	Gaby Amarantos	3	Adri Amorim	"Os Cegos do Castelo"	Eliminated
Episode 10 (December 15, 2022)	**Gaby Amarantos**	4	Bela Portugal	"Somewhere Only We Know"	Advanced
Episode 10 (December 15, 2022)	Lulu Santos	4	Brena Marinho	"Eu Amo Você"	Eliminated
Episode 11 (December 20, 2022)	**Lulu Santos**	1	Juniô Castanha	"As Rosas Não Falam"	Advanced
Episode 11 (December 20, 2022)	Michel Teló	1	Analu	"Deixa Acontecer"	Eliminated
Episode 11 (December 20, 2022)	**Gaby Amarantos**	2	Nath Audizio	"God Is a Woman"	Advanced
Episode 11 (December 20, 2022)	Iza	2	Bê Lourenço	"Ela Partiu"	Eliminated
Episode 11 (December 20, 2022)	**Michel Teló**	3	Duda & Isa Amorim	"Índia"	Advanced
Episode 11 (December 20, 2022)	Gaby Amarantos	3	Val Andrade	"My Love"	Eliminated
Episode 11 (December 20, 2022)	Iza	4	Agatha Henriques	—	Disqualified
Episode 11 (December 20, 2022)	**Lulu Santos**	4	Mel Fernandes	"Apenas Mais Uma de Amor"	Advanced

== Remix ==
Fast passes
Michel Teló	Iza	Gaby Amarantos	Lulu Santos
Keilla Júnia	Dgê	Nath Audizio	Juceir Jr

Key

Artist was chosen by their coach and advanced to the Live shows
Artist was stolen by another coach and advanced to the Live shows
Artist was eliminated

Remix results
Episode	Coach	Order	Artist	Song	Result
Episode 12 (December 22, 2022)	Lulu Santos	1	Antonia Medeiros	"Salve Todas"	Eliminated
Episode 12 (December 22, 2022)	Lulu Santos	2	Déborah Castolline	"Thriller"	Eliminated
Episode 12 (December 22, 2022)	Lulu Santos	3	Juniô Castanha	"Apaga a Luz"	Coach's choice
Episode 12 (December 22, 2022)	Lulu Santos	4	Mel Fernandes	"Romaria"	Eliminated
Episode 12 (December 22, 2022)	Gaby Amarantos	5	Bela Portugal	"Hotel Caro"	Eliminated
Episode 12 (December 22, 2022)	Gaby Amarantos	6	Cesar Soares	"O Tempo Não Pára"	Stolen by Iza
Episode 12 (December 22, 2022)	Gaby Amarantos	7	Mila Santana	"Berimbau"	Coach's choice
Episode 12 (December 22, 2022)	Michel Teló	8	Brenda Helen	"A Boba Fui Eu"	Stolen by Lulu
Episode 12 (December 22, 2022)	Michel Teló	9	Duda & Isa Amorim	"Se Deus Me Ouvisse"	Coach's choice
Episode 12 (December 22, 2022)	Michel Teló	10	Makem	"Sweet Love"	Coach's choice
Episode 12 (December 22, 2022)	Iza	11	Bell Lins	"Never Too Much"	Coach's choice
Episode 12 (December 22, 2022)	Iza	12	Fellipe Dias	"Back to Bad"	Stolen by Gaby

== Live shows ==
=== Semifinals ===
Key

Artist received the most points and advanced to the Finals
Artist received the fewest points and was eliminated

Semifinals results
Episode	Coach	Order	Artist	Song	Result (in points)		
Episode	Coach	Order	Artist	Song	Coach	Public	Total
Episode 13 (December 27, 2022)	Gaby Amarantos	1	Fellipe Dias	"Você Me Vira A Cabeça (Me Tira Do Sério)"	00.00	24.56	24.56
Episode 13 (December 27, 2022)	Gaby Amarantos	2	Mila Santana	"And I Am Telling You I'm Not Going"	20.00	48.07	68.07
Episode 13 (December 27, 2022)	Gaby Amarantos	3	Nath Audizio	"Até Que Durou"	00.00	27.37	27.37
Episode 13 (December 27, 2022)	Iza	4	Bell Lins	"I'll Never Love Again"	00.00	51.79	51.79
Episode 13 (December 27, 2022)	Iza	5	Cesar Soares	"Espumas ao Vento"	00.00	30.52	30.52
Episode 13 (December 27, 2022)	Iza	6	Dgê	"Estranho"	20.00	17.69	37.69
Episode 13 (December 27, 2022)	Lulu Santos	7	Brenda Hellen	"João de Barro"	00.00	40.02	40.02
Episode 13 (December 27, 2022)	Lulu Santos	8	Juceir Jr	"Perfect"	20.00	44.72	64.72
Episode 13 (December 27, 2022)	Lulu Santos	9	Juniô Castanha	"Penhasco"	00.00	15.26	15.26
Episode 13 (December 27, 2022)	Michel Teló	10	Duda & Isa Amorim	"Não Aprendi Dizer Adeus"	00.00	27.16	27.16
Episode 13 (December 27, 2022)	Michel Teló	11	Keilla Júnia	"I Have Nothing"	20.00	51.45	71.45
Episode 13 (December 27, 2022)	Michel Teló	12	Makem	"De Volta Pro Aconchego"	00.00	21.39	21.39

=== Finals ===
Finals results
Coach	Artist	Episode 14 (December 29, 2022)				Result
Coach	Artist	Order	Song	Order	Song	Result
Iza	Bell Lins	1	"Love On Top"	5	"Amor Puro"	Runner-up
Lulu Santos	Juceir Jr	2	"Um Certo Alguém"	6	"How Deep Is Your Love"	Runner-up
Michel Teló	Keilla Júnia	3	"I Will Always Love You"	7	"Como É Grande O Meu Amor Por Você"	Winner (51.78%)
Gaby Amarantos	Mila Santana	4	"Mulher do Fim do Mundo"	8	"Crazy in Love"	Runner-up

Non-competition performances
Order	Performers	Song
1.1	Lulu Santos	"Minha Vida"
1.2	Gaby Amarantos	"Reconvexo"
1.3	Iza	"Mó Paz"
1.4	Michel Teló	"Gatinha Manhosa"/"Se Você Pensa"/"Minha Fama de Mau"
1.5	Keilla Júnia	"Rise Up"

== Elimination chart ==
Key

- Team Teló
- Team Iza
- Team Gaby
- Team Lulu

Results

- Winner
- Runner-up
- Saved by fast pass
- Saved by coach
- Stolen by coach
- Advanced to the final
- Eliminated

Final shows' results
Artist	Week 1	Week 2	
Artist	Week 1	Tuesday	Thursday
Keilla Júnia	Safe	Advanced	Winner
Bell Lins	Safe	Advanced	Runner-up
Juceir Jr	Safe	Advanced	Runner-up
Mila Santana	Safe	Advanced	Runner-up
Brenda Helen	Safe	Eliminated	Eliminated (week 2)
Cesar Soares	Safe	Eliminated	Eliminated (week 2)
Dgê	Safe	Eliminated	Eliminated (week 2)
Duda & Isa Amorim	Safe	Eliminated	Eliminated (week 2)
Fellipe Dias	Safe	Eliminated	Eliminated (week 2)
Juniô Castanha	Safe	Eliminated	Eliminated (week 2)
Makem	Safe	Eliminated	Eliminated (week 2)
Nath Audizio	Safe	Eliminated	Eliminated (week 2)
Antonia Medeiros	Eliminated	Eliminated (week 1)	
Bela Portugal	Eliminated	Eliminated (week 1)	
Déborah Castolline	Eliminated	Eliminated (week 1)	
Mel Fernandes	Eliminated	Eliminated (week 1)	

== Ratings and reception ==
=== Brazilian ratings ===
All numbers are in points and provided by Kantar Ibope Media.

Episode	Title	Air date	Timeslot	SP viewers (in points)	Source
1	Blind Auditions 1	November 15, 2022	Tuesday 10:30 p.m.	15.1	
2	Blind Auditions 2	November 17, 2022	Thursday 10:30 p.m.	16.5	
3	Blind Auditions 3	November 22, 2022	Tuesday 10:30 p.m.	14.6	
4	Blind Auditions 4	November 24, 2022	Thursday 10:30 p.m.	12.9	
5	Showdowns 1	November 29, 2022	Tuesday 10:30 p.m.	15.5	
6	Showdowns 2	December 1, 2022	Thursday 10:30 p.m.	16.3	
7	Showdowns 3	December 6, 2022	Tuesday 10:30 p.m.	15.1	
8	Battles 1	December 8, 2022	Thursday 10:30 p.m.	15.4	
9	Battles 2	December 13, 2022	Tuesday 10:30 p.m.	15.7	
10	Cross Battles 1	December 15, 2022	Thursday 10:30 p.m.	13.3	
11	Cross Battles 2	December 20, 2022	Tuesday 10:30 p.m.	14.9	
12	Remix	December 22, 2022	Thursday 10:30 p.m.	14.7	
13	Semifinals	December 27, 2022	Tuesday 10:30 p.m.	16.6	
14	Finals	December 29, 2022	Thursday 10:30 p.m.	15.3	

- In 2022, each point represents 258.821 households in 15 market cities in Brazil (74.666 households in São Paulo).
