= Life Is Beautiful (Tony Bennett album) =

Studio album by Tony Bennett
- Released: January 1, 1975
- Genre: Vocal jazz, traditional pop
- Label: Improv

Tony Bennett chronology
The Rodgers and Hart Songbook (1973)	Life Is Beautiful (1975)	The Tony Bennett/Bill Evans Album (1975)

Life Is Beautiful is an album released by Tony Bennett in 1975. It was named after the song written by Fred Astaire. The album was the first project of Bennett's own Improv label. The album was Bennett's tribute to the American songbook featuring songs of Cole Porter, Richard Rodgers, Irving Berlin and others. The pianist, Torrie Zito, wrote new arrangements for Bennett's large session orchestra. The album was reissued by Concord with the addition of a separately recorded 13-minute Cole Porter medley.

On November 8, 2011, Sony Music Distribution included the CD in a box set entitled The Complete Collection.

== Reception ==
Professional ratings
Review scores
Source	Rating
AllMusic	3/5 stars

In a review of the album on AllMusic, John Bush believes Bennett selected "ten intriguing selections for his material...reflecting his 25 years of investigation into the American songbook." He calls Bennett's cover of Duke Ellington's "Reflections" the best track on the album in a "sweetly remembered, world-weary, yet majestic performance". Bush also commends Bennett on the songs "I Used to Be Color Blind" by Irving Berlin and "Experiment" by Cole Porter as "great versions of rare songs by top-drawer composers". He warns though that Bennett's voice "isn't always in top condition here; he strains for a few notes, and several times attempts to power through lines that would've been improved by clever phrasing."

In a separate review on AllMusic, William Ruhlmann explains "the result was a record that had nothing to do with pop music trends in 1975, which was exactly the way that Bennett wanted it. Decades later, it sounds fresher than many of his late '60s/early '70s attempts to be contemporary."

== Track listing ==
1. "Life Is Beautiful" (Fred Astaire, Tommy Wolf) – 2:28
2. "All Mine" (Ray Evans, Rudy Guerra, Francis Hime, Jay Livingston) – 2:55
3. "Bridges ("Travessia")" (Gene Lees, Milton Nascimento) – 3:37
4. "Reflections" (Duke Ellington, Milt Raskin) – 3:36
5. "Experiment" (Cole Porter) – 1:48
6. "This Funny World" (Lorenz Hart, Richard Rodgers) – 2:48
7. "As Time Goes By" (Herman Hupfeld) – 3:14
8. "I Used to Be Color Blind" (Irving Berlin) – 2:23
9. "Lost in the Stars" (Maxwell Anderson, Kurt Weill) – 4:06
10. "There'll Be Some Changes Made" (Billy Higgins, W. Benton Overstreet) – 3:03
11. Cole Porter medley: "What Is This Thing Called Love?"/"Love for Sale/"You'd Be So Nice to Come Home To" (Cole Porter) – 12:49 (on Concord reissue only)
