= Life Is Beautiful (Fred Astaire song) =

"Life Is Beautiful" is a 1974 song with music written by Fred Astaire and lyrics by Tommy Wolf. Astaire included the song on his album Attitude Dancing (1976).

Tony Bennett was so impressed with the tune, it became the title track of his album of the same name in 1975. Bennett also performed the song as Astaire looked on during a March 1975 episode of The Merv Griffin Show.

The song became widely known as the closing theme for The Tonight Show Starring Johnny Carson. In 1987, in memory of Astaire, who had died earlier that year, Carson closed out his 25th Anniversary special with a clip of Astaire singing the song from an appearance on the show in 1976.
