= Remígio =

- Municipality
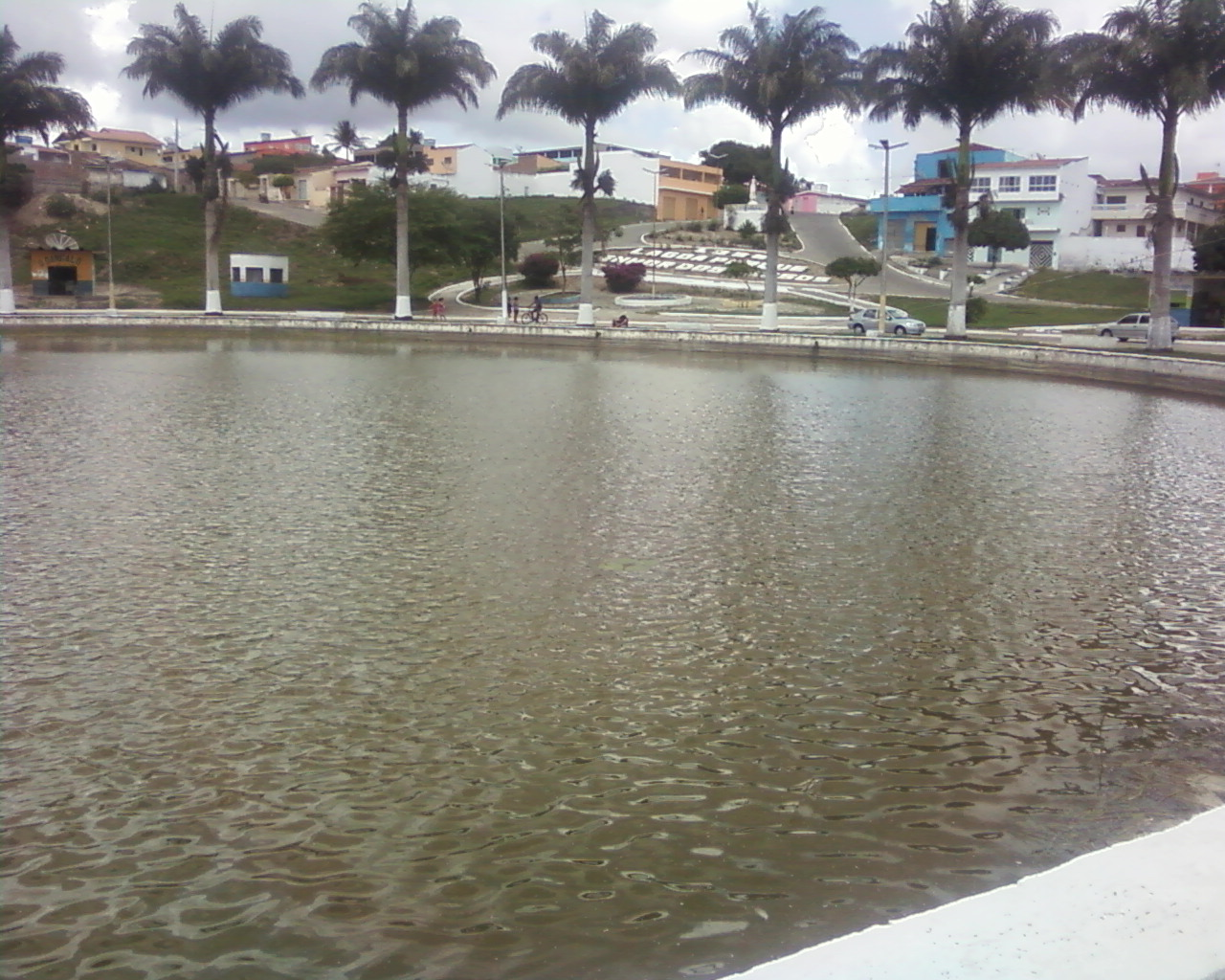

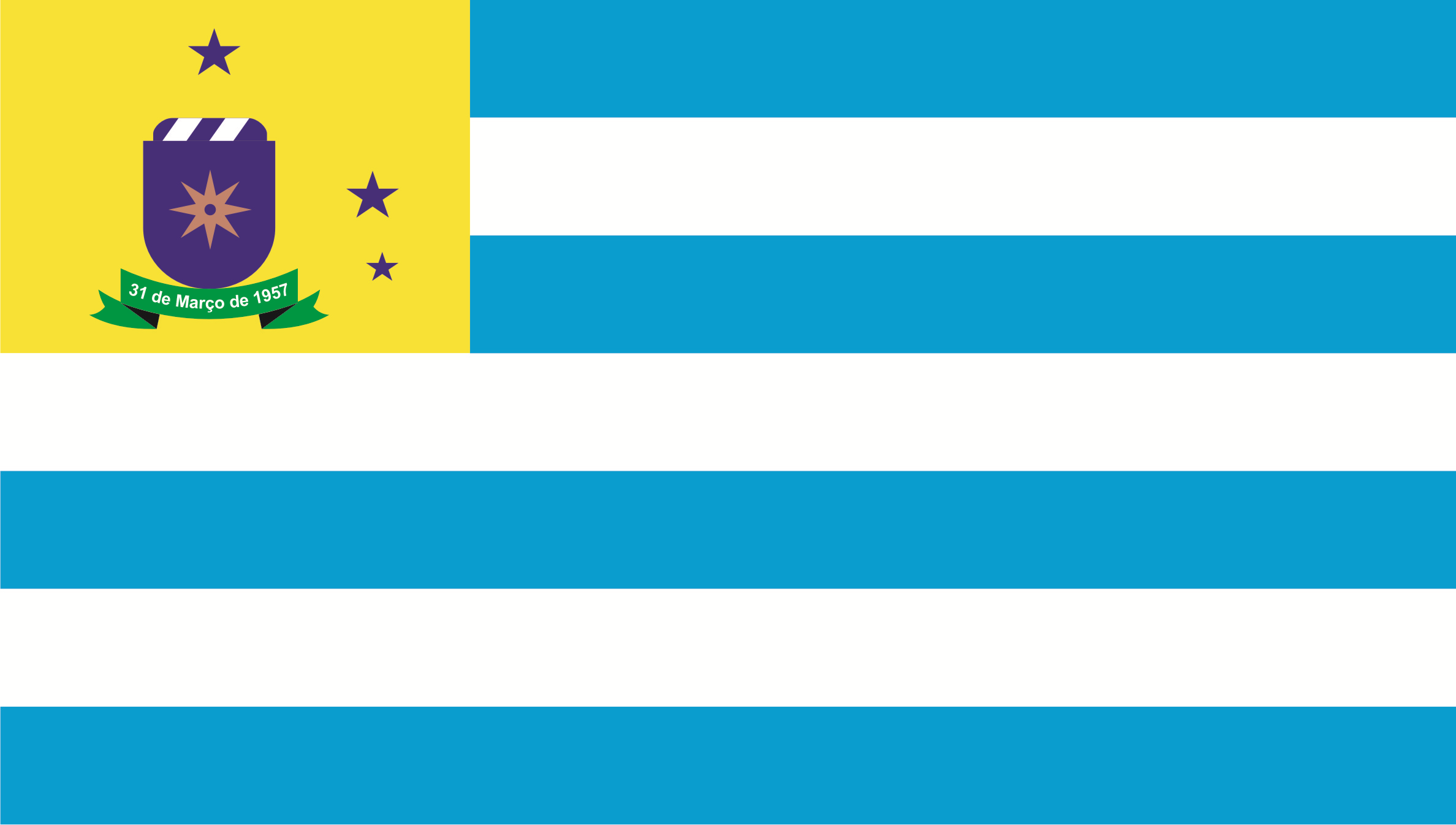
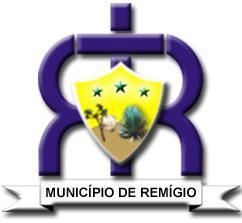
- Flag Coat of arms

- Location in Brazil
- Coordinates: 6°54′10″S 35°50′2″W
- Country: Brazil
- Region: Northeast
- State: Paraíba
- Mesoregion: Agreste Paraibano

Area
  - Total: 68.751 sq mi (178.064 km^{2})
- Elevation: 1,946 ft (593 m)

Population (2020)
  - Total: 19,798
  - Density: 255.7/sq mi (98.73/km^{2})
- Time zone: UTC−3 (BRT)
- Postal Code: 58398-000
- Area code: +5583
- HDI (2010): 0.607 – medium
- Website: www.remigio.pb.gov.br

Remígio (Central northeastern portuguese pronunciation: [hẽˈmiʒjw]) is a municipality in the state of Paraíba in the Northeast Region of Brazil.

== See also ==
- List of municipalities in Paraíba
