= Bela Cruz =

Municipality in Ceará, Brazil

Coordinates: 3.05083°S 40.1678°W

- Municipality
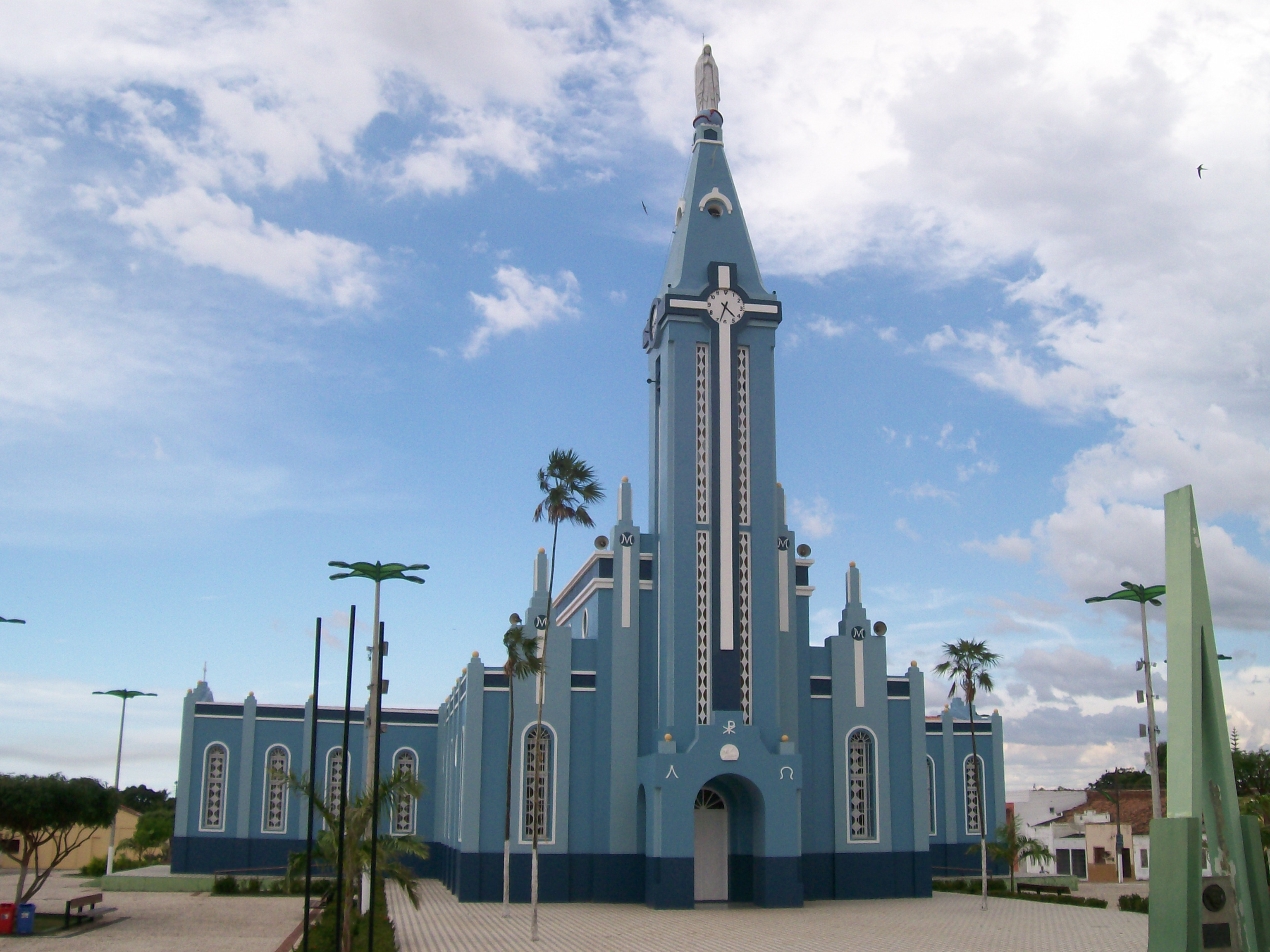
- The Bela Cruz Church

- Flag Coat of arms
- Interactive map of Bela Cruz
- Country: Brazil
- Region: Nordeste
- State: Ceará
- Mesoregion: Noroeste Cearense

Population (2020)
  - Total: 32,722
- Time zone: UTC−3 (BRT)

Bela Cruz is a municipality in the state of Ceará in the Nordeste region of Brazil.

== See also ==
- List of municipalities in Ceará
