= Bridges (Milton Nascimento song) =

"Travessia", known in the English version as "Bridges" is a 1967 composition by Milton Nascimento and Fernando Brant, with English lyrics added in 1969 by Gene Lees. The song is the title track of Nascimento's 1967 album Travessia.

"Travessia" won second place at the Rio-based II Festival Internacional da Canção in October 1967, and was immediately offered for pressing and rights in America.

== Recordings in English ==
The English version was recorded by artists including:

- Tony Bennett on his 1975 album Life Is Beautiful. and released as the B-side of "As Time Goes By".
- Sergio Mendes on his 1978 studio album "Brasil '88".
- Susannah McCorkle on her 1990 CD Sábia.
- Maki Nomiya on her 2004 album Dress Code.
- Astrud Gilberto on her 1972 album Astrud Gilberto Now.
