= 1992 in basketball =

The following are the basketball events of the year 1992 throughout the world.

== Championships ==
=== 1992 Olympics ===
- Men: United States of America 117, Croatia 85
- Women: Unified Team 76, China 66

=== Professional ===
- Men
  - 1992 NBA Finals: Chicago Bulls over the Portland Trail Blazers 4–2. MVP: Michael Jordan
    - 1992 NBA Playoffs
    - 1991–92 NBA season
    - 1992 NBA draft
    - 1992 NBA All-Star Game
  - Eurobasket: None.
- Women
  - Eurobasket Women: None

=== College ===
- Men
  - NCAA
    - Division I: Duke 71, Michigan 51
    - NIT: Virginia 81, Notre Dame 76
    - Division II: Virginia Union 100, Bridgeport 75
    - Division III: Calvin 62, Rochester 49
  - NAIA
    - Division I Oklahoma City 82, Central Arkansas 73 OT
    - Division II Grace 85, Northwestern (IA) 79 OT
  - NJCAA
    - Division I Three Rivers Community College (MO) 78, Butler Community College (KS) 77
    - Division II Owens Technical College (OH) 105, Iowa Lakes Community College (IA) 86
    - Division III Sullivan County Community College 101, Eastfield College 76
- Women
  - NCAA
    - Division I: Stanford 78, Western Kentucky 62
    - Division II: Delta State 65, North Dakota State 63
    - Division III: Alma 79, Moravian 75
  - NAIA
    - Division I: Arkansas Tech 84, Wayland Baptist (Texas) 68
    - Division II: Northern State (S.D.) 73, Tarleton State 56
  - NJCAA
    - Division I Louisburg College 104, Central Florida Community College 89
    - Division II Illinois Central College 89, Lansing Community College 72
    - Division III Becker College, Mass. 87, Ocean County College 54

== Awards and honors ==
=== Professional ===
- Men
  - NBA Most Valuable Player Award: Michael Jordan
  - NBA Rookie of the Year Award: Larry Johnson, Charlotte Hornets
  - NBA Defensive Player of the Year Award: David Robinson, San Antonio Spurs
  - NBA Coach of the Year Award: Don Nelson, Golden State Warriors

=== Collegiate ===
- Men
  - John R. Wooden Award: Christian Laettner, Duke
  - Naismith College Coach of the Year: Mike Krzyzewski, Duke
  - Frances Pomeroy Naismith Award: Tony Bennett, Green Bay
  - Associated Press College Basketball Player of the Year: Christian Laettner, Duke
  - NCAA basketball tournament Most Outstanding Player: Donald Williams, North Carolina
  - USBWA National Freshman of the Year: Chris Webber, Michigan
  - Associated Press College Basketball Coach of the Year: Roy Williams, Kansas
  - Naismith Outstanding Contribution to Basketball: John McLendon
- Women
  - Naismith College Player of the Year: Dawn Staley, Virginia
  - Naismith College Coach of the Year: Chris Weller, Maryland
  - Wade Trophy: Susan Robinson, Penn State
  - Frances Pomeroy Naismith Award: Rosemary Kosiorek, West Virginia
  - NCAA basketball tournament Most Outstanding Player: Molly Goodenbour, Stanford
  - Carol Eckman Award: Jill Hutchison, Illinois State University

=== Naismith Memorial Basketball Hall of Fame ===
- Class of 1992:
  - Sergei Belov
  - Lou Carnesecca
  - Lusia Harris-Stewart
  - Connie Hawkins
  - Bob Lanier
  - Al McGuire
  - Jack Ramsay
  - Nera White
  - Phil Woolpert

== Movies ==
- Final Shot: The Hank Gathers Story
- White Men Can't Jump

== Deaths ==
- February 5 — Bill Wheatley, 82, American Olympic gold medalist (1936).
- June 26 — Evan Male, 78, American college coach (Virginia).
- July 7 — Vernon Smith, 33, American CBA and Liga ACB player.
- August 3 — Eddie Riska, 72, American NBL player (Oshkosh All-Stars).
- August 19 — Stretch Murphy, 85, All-American college player (Purdue).
- December 11 — Moose Krause, 79, All-American college player and coach (Notre Dame).
