= List of most expensive basketball transfers =

The following is a list of most expensive basketball transfers, which presents the highest fees ever paid for players..

The list contains a few transfers which broke the world transfer record: those of Antonello Riva, Stefano Rusconi, Dino Rađa, Dino Meneghin, all broke the record, signing for Italian clubs and a Greek club. The list also features two players who, at the time of the transfer, broke the national record for the club they were signing for: Ricky Rubio and Milan Gurović.

== Highest buy-outs ==
Most high-value transfers involve clubs in the Eurozone. The order in this table is based on the transfer amount in euros. Due to exchange rate fluctuations the order is different in $ which is also shown on the table.

As of 28 July 2026;

Fee broke the world transfer record at the time of the transfer
Fee broke the national club record
Fee broke the record for an American player
Fee broke the record for a teenager

Rank	Player	From	To	Fee (M €)	Fee (M $)	Year	Notes
1	(China) Yao Ming	(China) Shanghai Sharks	(China) CBA	€12.9	$15	2002	
2	(Italy) Stefano Rusconi	(Italy) Pallacanestro Varese	(Italy) Benetton Treviso	€10	$15	1991	20 billion in former Italian lira (15 million cash plus two players: Dan Gay and Savio) or 1250 million in former Spanish peseta.
3	(Croatia) Dino Radja	(United States) Boston Celtics	(Greece) Panathinaikos	€8.5	$10	1997	Panathnaikos paid Celtics 2.5 billion in former Greek drachma
4	(Italy) Andrea Niccolai	(Italy) BingoSNAI Montecatini	(Italy) Virtus Roma	€6	$12	1991	16 billion in former Italian lira or 1100 million in former Spanish peseta
5	(Argentina) Facundo Campazzo	(Spain) Real Madrid	(United States) Denver Nuggets	€5.25	$6	2020	Nuggets officially paid $750k and Campazzo the rest through his contract
6	(Italy) Carlton Myers	(Italy) Basket Rimini	(Italy) Fortitudo Bologna	€4.5	$7.5	1995	12 billion in former Italian lira
7	(Italy) Riccardo Pittis	(Italy) Olimpia Milano	(Italy) Benetton Treviso	€4.5	$8.1	1993	12 billion in former Italian lira
8	(Italy) Riccardo Morandotti	(Italy) Berloni Torino	(Italy) Scaligera Basket Verona	€4	$9	1990	10 billion in former Italian lira
9	(Italy) Paolo Moretti	(Italy) Scaligera Basket Verona	(Italy) Virtus Bologna	€3.8	$8	1992	9 billion in former Italian lira
10	(Spain) Ricky Rubio	(Spain) Joventut Badalona	(Spain) FC Barcelona	€3.7	$5.1	2009	
11	(Italy) Ferdinando Gentile	(Italy) Juvecaserta Basket	(Italy) Stefanel Trieste	€3.3	$5.4	1993	8 billion in former Italian lira
-	(United States) Dominique Wilkins	(United States) Boston Celtics	(Greece) Panathinaikos	€3.3	$3.6	1995	
12	(Italy) Davide Bonora	(Italy) Scaligera Basket Verona	(Italy) Benetton Treviso	€3.3	$5	1995	8 billion in former Italian lira
13	(Italy) Antonello Riva	(Italy) Pallacanestro Cantù	(Italy) Olimpia Milano	€3.1	$5.7	1989	7.5 billion in former Italian lira
14	(Italy) Carlton Myers	(Italy) Victoria Libertas Pesaro	(Italy) Basket Rimini	€3.1	$4.7	1994	7.5 billion in former Italian lira
15	(Italy) Alessandro Fantozzi	(Italy) Basket Livorno	(Italy) Virtus Roma	€3.1	$6.25	1991	7.5 billion in former Italian lira
16	(Italy) Gianluca Basile	(Italy) Pallacanestro Reggiana	(Italy) Fortitudo Bologna	€3.1	$3.9	1999	7.5 billion in former Italian lira
17	(Serbia) Milan Gurovic	(Greece) Peristeri	(Spain) FC Barcelona	€3	$1.8	1998	600 million in Greek drachma or 500 million in former Spanish peseta
-	(Serbia) Nenad Krstić	(Russia) Triumph Lyubertsy	(United States) Oklahoma City Thunder	€3	$3.7	2008	Thunder officially $500k and the rest $2.5m paid by Krstić through his contract
-	(Spain) Sergio Rodriguez	(Spain) Real Madrid	(United States) Philadelphia 76ers	€3	$3.3	2016	
-	(Serbia) Darko Milicic	(Serbia) Hemofarm	(United States) Detroit Pistons	€2.6	$3	2003	
22	(Spain) Nikola Mirotić	(Spain) Real Madrid	(United States) Chicago Bulls	€2.5	$3.25	2014	
-	(Italy) Donato Avenia	(Italy) Viola Reggio Calabria	(Italy) Virtus Roma	€2.5	$5.4	1990	6 billion in former Italian lira
-	(Italy) Stefano Attruia	(Italy) Pallacanestro Pavia	(Italy) Virtus Roma	€2.5	$5.4	1990	6 billion in former Italian lira
-	(Italy) Flavio Carera	(Italy) Libertas Liburnia Basket Livorno	(Italy) Virtus Bologna	€2.5	$5.4	1992	6 billion in former Italian lira (4 billion plus Leonardo Conti)
27	(Croatia) Toni Kukoc	(Italy) Benneton Treviso	(United States) Chicago Bulls	€2.35	$2.5	1993	The release fee was paid by Kukoc
27	(Spain) Pau Gasol	(Spain) FC Barcelona	(United States) Memphis Grizzlies	€2.3	$2.5	2001	$2,15 million was paid by his agent and rest $350k by Grizzlies
-	-	(United States) (Greece) Thomaw Walkup	(Greece) Olympiacos	(United Arab Emirates) Dubai B.C.	€2.3	$2.6	2026
(Argentina) Luis Scola	(Spain) Tau	(United States) Houston Rockets	€2.3	$3.2	2007	Rockets officially $500k and the rest $2.7m paid by Scola through his contract	
-	(France) Guerschon Yabusele	(Spain) Real Madrid	(United States) Philadelphia 76ers	€2.2	$2.5	2024	The 76ers officially paid $850,000 and Yabusele paid the rest through his contract
27	(Poland) Maciej Lampe	(Spain) Real Madrid	(United States) New York Knicks	€2.2	$2	2003	$350k was paid by the Knicks
-	(Bosnia and Herzegovina) Mirza Teletović	(Spain) Saski Baskonia	(United States) Brooklyn Nets	€2.2	$2.8	2012	Majority of the amount was paid by the player himself
29	(Argentina) Hugo Sconochini	(Italy) Viola Reggio Calabria	(Italy) Olimpia Milano	€2	$3.7	1993	5.5 billion in former Italian lira
-	(Turkey) Cedi Osman	(Greece) Panathinaikos Athens	(Greece) PAOK B.C.	€2		2026	
-	(Lithuania) Šarūnas Jasikevičius	(United States) Golden State Warriors	(Greece) Panathinaikos Athens	€2	$2.7	2007	
-	(Slovenia) Luka Doncic	(Spain) Real Madrid	(United States) Dallas Mavericks	€2		2018	
-	(Lithuania) Jonas Valančiūnas	(Lithuania) BC Lietuvos rytas	(Canada) Toronto Raptors	€2	$2.5	2012	Excluded International Player Payment Amount (EIPPA), was set at $550,000 for 2012–13 season.
-	(Croatia) Mario Hezonja	(Spain) FC Barcelona	(United States) Orlando Magic	€2	$2.2	2015	
-	(Spain) Victor Claver	(Spain) Valencia Basket	(Spain) FC Barcelona	€2	$2.2	2016	
-	(Spain) Alex Abrines	(Spain) FC Barcelona	(United States) Oklahoma City Thunder	€2	$2.2	2016	
-	(Czech Republic) Tomáš Satoranský	(Spain) FC Barcelona	(United States) Washington Wizards	€2	$2.3	2016	
35	(Croatia) Toni Kukoc	(Croatia) KK Split	(Italy) Benneton Treviso	€1.9	$2	1991	The 6-year contract of $4.25m per annum made Kukoc the highest-paid basketball player in the world above Patrick Ewing.
36	(Greece) Thodoris Papaloukas	(Russia) CSKA Moscow	(Greece) Olympiacos	€1.8	$2.8	2008	
-	(Spain) Raül López	(Spain) Joventut Badalona	(Spain) Real Madrid	€1.8	$1.9	2000	275 million in former Spanish peseta
-	(Italy) Davide Pessina	(Italy) Pallacanestro Cantù	(Italy) Olimpia Milano	€1.8	$3.6	1991	5 billion in former Italian lira
-	(Italy) Nino Pellacani	(Italy) Auxilium Pallacanestro Torino	(Italy) Benetton Treviso	€1.8	$3.6	1991	5 billion in former Italian lira
-	(United States) (Spain) Brad Oleson	(Spain) Baloncesto Fuenlabrada	(Spain) Real Madrid	€1.8	$2.5	2009	
-	(Spain) Carlos Jiménez	(Spain) CB Estudiantes	(Spain) Baloncesto Málaga	€1.8	$2.3	2006	
-	(Turkey) Furkan Korkmaz	(Turkey) Efes Pilsen	(United States) Philadelphia 76ers	€1.8	$2	2017	$1.35m of the fee was paid by the player through his contract
39	(Bosnia and Herzegovina) Tarik Biberović	(Turkey) Fenerbahçe	(United States) Dallas Mavericks	€1.74	$2	2026	$1.1m of the fee was paid by the player through his contract
39	(Spain) Jorge Garbajosa	(Spain) Baloncesto Málaga	(Canada) Toronto Raptors	€1.7	$2.25	2006	Majority of the fee was paid by the player and his agent
40	(Spain) Alberto Herreros	(Spain) CB Estudiantes	(Spain) Real Madrid	€1.5	$1.6	1996	250 million in former Spanish peseta or 500 million in Greek drachma. It was the highest transfer fee in Spain at the time, exceeding the previous record, the 100 million pesetas Barcelona had paid CAI Zaragoza for Quique Andreu in 1993.
-	(Spain) Kostas Papanikolaou	(Greece) Olympiacos	(Spain) FC Barcelona	€1.5	$2	2013	400 million in Greek drachma
-	(Senegal) Brancou Badio	(Spain) Valencia Basket	(Greece) Panathinaikos Athens	€1.5		2026	
-	(Spain) Juan Carlos Navarro	(United States) Memphis Grizzlies	(Spain) FC Barcelona	€1.5	$2.3	2008	
-	(Slovenia) Goran Dragic	(Spain) Saski Baskonia	(United States) Phoenix Suns	€1.5	$2.3	2008	Suns officially paid $500k and Dragic the rest through his contract
-	(Spain) Felipe Reyes	(Spain) CB Estudiantes	(Spain) Real Madrid	€1.5	$1.8	2004	
-	(Spain) Jaime Pradilla	(Spain) Pamesa Valencia	(Spain) Real Madrid	€1.5	$	2026	
-	(Poland) Maciej Lampe	(Spain) Saski Baskonia	(Spain) FC Barcelona Bàsquet	€1.5		2013	
-	(Spain) Iñaki de Miguel	(Spain) CB Estudiantes	(Greece) Olympiacos	€1.5	$1.6	1999	252 million in former Spanish peseta or 400 million in former Greek drachma
44	(Spain) Ricky Rubio	(Spain) FC Barcelona	(United States) Minnesota Timberwolves	€1.4	$1.9	2011	
-	(Slovenia) (Italy) Gregor Fucka	(Italy) Olimpia Milano	(Italy) Fortitudo Bologna	€1.4	$1.7	1997	3.5 billion in former Italian lira
46	(Serbia) Milos Teodosic	(Serbia) Zeleznik	(Greece) Olympiacos	€1.3	$1.7	2007	
-	(Spain) Usman Garuba	(Spain) Real Madrid	(United States) Houston Rockets	€1.3		2021	
-	(Greece) Thodoris Papaloukas	(Greece) Panionios	(Greece) Olympiacos	€1.3	$1.4	2001	
-	(Argentina) Gabriel Deck	(Spain) Real Madrid	(United States) Oklahoma City Thunder	€1.3		2021	
-	(Serbia) Bogdan Bogdanovic	(Serbia) KK Partizan	(Turkey) Fenerbahce	€1.3	$1.7	2014	
-	(Serbia) Milos Teodosic	(Greece) Olympiacos	(Russia) CSKA Moscow	€1.3	$1.8	2011	
-	(United States) Bo McCalebb	(Italy) Siena	(Turkey) Fenerbahce	€1.3	$1.6	2012	
49	(United States) Patrick Beverley	(Russia) Spartak St Petersburg	(United States) Houston Rockets	€1.2	$1.6	2013	Rockets officially paid $250k and the rest $1.35m paid by Beverley through his contract
-	(Spain) José Antonio Paraíso	(Spain) Caceres	(Spain) Valencia Pamesa	€1.2	$1.25	2001	275 million in former Spanish peseta
-	(Greece) Vassilis Toliopoulos	(Greece) Panathinaikos	(Greece) Aris B.C.	€1.2		2026	
-	(Italy) Andrea Meneghin	(Italy) Pallacanestro Varese	(Italy) Climamio Bologna	€1.2	$1.5	2000	3 billion in former Italian lira
-	(Croatia) Dario Saric	(Croatia) KK Cibona	(Turkey) Efes Pilsen	€1.2	$1.5	2014	
-	(Serbia) Nemanja Bjelica	(Turkey) Fenerbahçe	(United States) Minnesota Timberwolves	€1.2	$1.5	2015	
-	(Argentina) Pablo Prigioni	(Spain) Tau	(Spain) Real Madrid	€1.2	$1.7	2009	
-	(Croatia) Dragan Bender	(Israel) Maccabi Tel Aviv	(United States) Phoenix Suns	€1.1	$1.3	2016	
-	(Croatia) Drazen Petrovic	(Spain) Real Madrid	(United States) Portland Trail Blazers	€1.1	$1.15 He was signed by Real Madrid in March 1987 for a 4-year contract (1988-1992) worth of 160 millions pesetas (total 960k euros for 4 years). He moved in 1988 from Cibona for 40 million pesetas ($350k).	1989	Blazers paid the fee and also agreed to play two exhibition games in Spain.

=== Historical progression ===
The transfer fees fluctuate due to exchange rate variations and are based on the exchange rate at the time of the transfer.

Year	Player	From	To	Fee (B Italian lira)	Fee (M €)	Fee (M $)
1981	(Italy) Domenico Zampolini	(Italy) Basket Rimini	(Italy) Scavolini Pesaro	1	€516k	$800k
1989	(Italy) Antonello Riva	(Italy) Pallacanestro Cantù	(Italy) Olimpia Milano	7.5	€3.1	$5.7
1990	(Italy) Riccardo Morandotti	(Italy) Berloni Torino	(Italy) Scaligera Basket Verona	10	€4	9$
1991	(Italy) Andrea Niccolai	(Italy) BingoSNAI Montecatini	(Italy) Virtus Roma	16	€6	12$
1991	(Italy) Stefano Rusconi	(Italy) Pallacanestro Varese	(Italy) Benetton Treviso	20	€10	15$

=== Highest transfers NBA/Europe ===
Rank	Player	From	To	Fee (M €)	Fee (M $)	Year
1	(Croatia) Dino Radja	(United States) Boston Celtics	(Greece) Panathinaikos	€8.5	$10	1997
2	(Argentina) Facundo Campazzo	(Spain) Real Madrid	(United States) Denver Nuggets	€6	$6	2020
3	(United States) Dominique Wilkins	(United States) Boston Celtics	(Greece) Panathinaikos	€3.3	$3.6	1995
4	(Spain) Sergio Rodriguez	(Spain) Real Madrid	(United States) Philadelphia 76ers	€3	$3.3	2016
5	(Serbia) Darko Milicic	(Serbia) Hemofarm	(United States) Detroit Pistons	€2.6	$3	2003
6	(Spain) Nikola Mirotić	(Spain) Real Madrid	(United States) Chicago Bulls	€2.5	$3.25	2014
7	(Croatia) Toni Kukoc	(Italy) Benneton Treviso	(United States) Chicago Bulls	€2.35	$2.5	1993
8	(Argentina) Luis Scola	(Spain) Tau	(United States) Houston Rockets	€2.3	$3.2	2007
-	(Spain) Pau Gasol	(Spain) FC Barcelona	(United States) Memphis Grizzlies	€2.3	$2.5	2001
10	(Bosnia and Herzegovina) Mirza Teletović	(Spain) Saski Baskonia	(United States) Brooklyn Nets	€2.2	$2.8	2012
-	(France) Guerschon Yabusele	(Spain) Real Madrid	(United States) Philadelphia 76ers	€2.2	$2.5	2024
-	(Poland) Maciej Lampe	(Spain) Real Madrid	(United States) New York Knicks	€2.2	$2	2003
12	(Czech Republic) Tomáš Satoranský	(Spain) FC Barcelona	(United States) Washington Wizards	€2	$2.3	2016
-	(Lithuania) Šarūnas Jasikevičius	(United States) Golden State Warriors	(Greece) Panathinaikos Athens	€2	$2.7	2007
-	(Slovenia) Luka Doncic	(Spain) Real Madrid	(United States) Dallas Mavericks	€2		2018
-	(Spain) Alex Abrines	(Spain) FC Barcelona	(United States) Oklahoma City Thunder	€2	$2.2	2016
-	(Croatia) Mario Hezonja	(Spain) FC Barcelona	(United States) Orlando Magic	€2	$2.2	2015
-	(Lithuania) Jonas Valančiūnas	(Lithuania) BC Lietuvos rytas	(Canada) Toronto Raptors	€2	$2.5	2012
16	(Bosnia and Herzegovina) Tarik Biberović	(Turkey) Fenerbahçe	(United States) Dallas Mavericks	€1.74	$2	2026
16	(Turkey) Furkan Korkmaz	(Turkey) Efes Pilsen	(United States) Philadelphia 76ers	€1.8	$2	2017
16	(Spain) Jorge Garbajosa	(Spain) Baloncesto Málaga	(Canada) Toronto Raptors	€1.7	$2.25	2006
17	(Slovenia) Goran Dragic	(Spain) Saski Baskonia	(United States) Phoenix Suns	€1.5	$2.3	2008
-	(Spain) Juan Carlos Navarro	(United States) Memphis Grizzlies	(Spain) FC Barcelona	€1.5	$2.3	2008
18	(Spain) Ricky Rubio	(Spain) FC Barcelona	(United States) Minnesota Timberwolves	€1.4	$1.9	2011
19	(Spain) Usman Garuba	(Spain) Real Madrid	(United States) Houston Rockets	€1.3		2021
-	(Argentina) Gabriel Deck	(Spain) Real Madrid	(United States) Oklahoma City Thunder	€1.3		2021
21	(Serbia) Nemanja Bjelica	(Turkey) Fenerbahçe	(United States) Minnesota Timberwolves	€1.2	$1.5	2015
-	(United States) Patrick Beverley	(Russia) Spartak St Petersburg	(United States) Houston Rockets	€1.2	$1.6	2013
23	(Croatia) Drazen Petrovic	(Spain) Real Madrid	(United States) Portland Trail Blazers	€1.1	$1.15	1989
-	(Croatia) Dragan Bender	(Israel) Maccabi Tel Aviv	(United States) Phoenix Suns	€1.1	$1.3	2016
24	(Serbia) Miroslav Raduljica	(China) Shandong Lions	(United States) Minnesota Timberwolves	€975k	$1.2m	2026
25	(Turkey) Cedi Osman	(Turkey) Anadolu Efes	(United States) Cleveland Cavaliers	€900k	$1	2017
26	(Croatia) Mario Hezonja	(Spain) Real Madrid	(United States) Cleveland Cavaliers	€735k	$850k	2026
26	(Venezuela) Carl Herrera	(Spain) Real Madrid	(United States) Houston Rockets		$250k (Note: Original Buyout clause was 1 billion pesetas (€6 million))	1991

=== Most expensive teenagers ===
Rank	Player	From	To	Fee (M €)	Fee (M $)	Year
1	(Spain) Ricky Rubio	(Spain) Joventut Badalona	(Spain) FC Barcelona	€3.7	$5.1	2009
2	(Serbia) Darko Milicic	(Serbia) Hemofarm	(United States) Detroit Pistons	€2.6	$3	2003
3	(Spain) Joel Parra	(Spain) Joventut Badalona	(Spain) FC Barcelona	€1		2023

=== World's highest paid salaries ===
The salaries fluctuate due to exchange rate variations and are based on the exchange rate at the time of the contract signed. Stats from 1990 onwards. The salaries are listed as annual.

From	To	Player	Club	Per annum (M $)	Duration	Notes
1990	1991	(Croatia) Dino Rađa	(Italy) Virtus Roma	$3	5 years	Equal to 3.6 billion italian lire. His annual salary at the time at Virtus was higher than soccer superstars Diego Maradona's and Roberto Baggio's annual compensations at Napoli and Juventus, respectively.
1990	1991	(United States) Patrick Ewing	(United States) NY Knicks	$4.25		
1991	1992	(Croatia) Toni Kukoc	(Italy) Benneton Treviso	$5	6 years	The 6-year contract of $4.16 to $5 million per annum ($25–30 million for 6 years) made Kukoc the highest-paid basketball player in the world above Patrick Ewing.
1991	1992	(United States) Larry Bird	(United States) Boston Celtics	$7	-92	Bird's final year.
1992	1994	(United States) David Robinson	(United States) San Antonio Spurs	$5.7		
1994	1995	(United States) Magic Johnson	(United States) LA Lakers	$14.6	1992-95	Johnson was not active at the time, but he collected the full amount. David Robinson was still the highest paid in the world, among active players, with $5.7 million per annum
1996	1997	(United States) Patrick Ewing	(United States) NY Knicks	$9.4	1992-98	Patrick Ewing of the New York Knicks will earn under an extension he signed in November 1992 for 1995-96 and 1996-97. When added to his current contract, that extension guaranteed him $33 million for six years.
1997	1998	(United States) Michael Jordan	(United States) Chicago Bulls	$33.1	1997-98	Jordan's final year.
1998	1999	(United States) Patrick Ewing	(United States) NY Knicks	$9.4	$18.5	

== See also ==
- List of most expensive American soccer transfers
- List of most expensive association football transfers
- List of basketball players with most career points

== Sources ==
- Éstos son los traspasos más caros de la historia de la ACB (2009)
- Hackett a Milano? E’ già storia. I trasferimenti più grossi del basket italiano (2013)
