= 1992 National Invitation Tournament =

U.S. college basketball tournament

- Season: 1991–92
- Teams: 32
- Finals site: Madison Square Garden, New York City
- Champions: Virginia Cavaliers (2nd title)
- Runner-up: Notre Dame Fighting Irish (3rd title game)
- Semifinalists: Utah Utes (3rd semifinal); Florida Gators (2nd semifinal)
- Winning coach: Jeff Jones (1st title)
- MVP: Bryant Stith (Virginia)

The 1992 National Invitation Tournament was the 1992 edition of the annual NCAA college basketball competition.

== Selected teams ==
Below is a list of the 32 teams selected for the tournament.

- Arizona State
- Ball State
- Boston College
- Butler
- Florida
- James Madison
- Kansas State
- Long Beach State
- Louisiana Tech
- Manhattan
- Minnesota
- New Mexico
- Notre Dame
- Penn State
- Pittsburgh
- Purdue
- Rhode Island
- Richmond
- Rutgers
- Southern Illinois
- Tennessee
- TCU
- UAB
- UC Santa Barbara
- Utah
- Vanderbilt
- Villanova
- Virginia
- Washington State
- Western Kentucky
- Western Michigan
- Wisconsin–Green Bay

== Bracket ==
Below are the four first round brackets, along with the four-team championship bracket.

First Round
Purdue	82
Butler	56
TCU	73
Long Beach State	61
Pittsburgh	67
Penn State	65
Florida	66
Richmond	52

Second Round
Purdue	67
TCU	51
Pittsburgh	74
Florida	77

Quarterfinals
Purdue	67
Florida	74

First Round
Virginia	83
Villanova	80
Tennessee	71
UAB	68
New Mexico	90
Louisiana Tech	84
Washington State	72
Minnesota	70

Second Round
Virginia	77
Tennessee	52
New Mexico	79
Washington State	71

Quarterfinals
Virginia	76
New Mexico	71

First Round
Notre Dame	63
Western Michigan	56
Kansas State	85
Western Kentucky	74
Rutgers	73
James Madison	69
Manhattan	67
Wisconsin–Green Bay	65

Second Round
Notre Dame	64
Kansas State	48
Rutgers	61
Manhattan	62

Quarterfinals
Notre Dame	74
Manhattan	58

First Round
Arizona State	71
UC Santa Barbara	65
Utah	72
Ball State	57
Boston College	78
Southern Illinois	69
Rhode Island	68
Vanderbilt	63

Second Round
Arizona State	58
Utah	80
Boston College	80
Rhode Island	81 2OT

Quarterfinals
Utah	84
Rhode Island	72

=== Semifinals & finals ===
Semifinals
Florida	56
Virginia	62
Notre Dame	58
Utah	55

Finals
Virginia	81^{OT}
Notre Dame	76

Third place game
Florida	78
Utah	81

== See also ==
- 1992 National Women's Invitational Tournament
- 1992 NCAA Division I men's basketball tournament
- 1992 NCAA Division II men's basketball tournament
- 1992 NCAA Division III men's basketball tournament
- 1992 NCAA Division I women's basketball tournament
- 1992 NAIA Division I men's basketball tournament
- 1992 NAIA Division II men's basketball tournament
