= 1990 in basketball =

The following are the basketball events of the year 1990 throughout the world.

Basketball competitions taking place in 1990

The 1990 FIBA World Championship for Women took place in Kuala Lumpur, Malaysia, and was won by the United States.

== Winners of major team competitions 1989–1990 ==
=== Men ===
Europe

- Germany : Bayer Giants Leverkusen
- British BL : Kingston
- Belgium : RC Malines
- Bulgaria : PBC CSKA Sofia
- Spain : FC Barcelona Bàsquet
- Saporta Cup : Virtus Pallacanestro Bologna
- Euroleague Basketball : KK Split
- France : Limoges CSP
- Greece : Aris B.C.
- Israel : Maccabi Tel Aviv B.C.
- Italy : Victoria Libertas Pesaro
- Korać Cup : Victoria Libertas Pesaro
- Poland : Lech Poznań
- Sweden : Södertälje Kings
- Switzerland : Pully Basket
- Czechoslovakia : BC Brno
- Turkey : Galatasaray S.K.
- USSR : PBC CSKA Moscow
- Yugoslavia : KK Split

Americas

- Argentina : Asociación Deportiva Atenas
- Brazil : Franca BC
- CBA : La Crosse Catbirds
- NBA : Detroit Pistons
- NCAA : UNLV Rebels
- Uruguay : -
- Puerto Rico : Leones de Ponce
- Venezuela : Bravos de Portuguesa

Africa, Asia, Oceania

- Angola : Petro Luanda
- Australia : Perth Wildcats
- Morocco : FUS de Rabat
- New Zealand : Canterbury Rams

=== Women ===
Europe

- Germany : DJK Agon 08 Düsseldorf
- Spain : CB Masnou-Microbank
- EuroLeague Women : Trogylos Enimont Priolo
- France : Challes-Les-Eaux
- Italy : Unicar Cesena
- Netherlands : BV Den Helder
- Poland : PZU Polfa Pabianice
- Ronchetti Cup : Basket Parma
- Sweden : Arvika Basket
- URSS : Elektrosila Leningrad

Americas

- NCAA : Stanford Cardinal

Africa, Asia, Oceania

- Australie : North Adelaide

== Player awards (NBA) ==
=== Regular season MVP ===
- Magic Johnson, Los Angeles Lakers

=== NBA Finals MVP ===
- Isiah Thomas, Detroit Pistons

=== Slam Dunk Contest ===
- Dominique Wilkins, Atlanta Hawks

=== Three-point Shootout ===
- Craig Hodges, Chicago Bulls

== Collegiate awards ==
- Men
  - John R. Wooden Award: Lionel Simmons, La Salle
  - Naismith College Coach of the Year: Bobby Cremins, Georgia Tech
  - Frances Pomeroy Naismith Award: Greg "Boo" Harvey, St. John's
  - Associated Press College Basketball Player of the Year: Lionel Simmons, La Salle
  - NCAA basketball tournament Most Outstanding Player: Christian Laettner, Duke
  - USBWA National Freshman of the Year: Kenny Anderson, Georgia Tech
  - Associated Press College Basketball Coach of the Year: Jim Calhoun, Connecticut
  - Naismith Outstanding Contribution to Basketball: Frank McGuire
- Women
  - Naismith College Player of the Year: Jennifer Azzi, Stanford
  - Naismith College Coach of the Year: Tara VanDerveer, Stanford
  - Wade Trophy: Jennifer Azzi, Stanford
  - Frances Pomeroy Naismith Award: Julie Dabrowski, SNHU
  - NCAA basketball tournament Most Outstanding Player: Jennifer Azzi, Stanford
  - Carol Eckman Award: Dr. Maryalyce Jeremiah, California State, Fullerton

== Naismith Memorial Basketball Hall of Fame ==
- Class of 1990:
  - Dave Bing
  - Elvin Hayes
  - Neil Johnston
  - Earl Monroe

== Births ==
- October 21 — Ricky Rubio

== Deaths ==
- March 4 — Hank Gathers, American college player (Loyola Marymount) (born 1967)
- April 12 — Irving Terjesen, American NBL player (Akron Firestone Non-Skids) (born 1915)
- April 22 — Bob Davies, American Hall of Fame player (Rochester Royals) (born 1920)
- May 21 — Ed Steitz, American college coach (Springfield) and Hall of Fame NCAA administrator (born 1920)
- August 12 — James Stewart, Canadian Olympic silver medalist (1936) (born 1910)
- August 31 — Nathaniel Clifton, American player (New York Knicks, Detroit Pistons) (born 1922)
- September 28 — Larry O'Brien, third commissioner of the NBA (1975—1984) (born 1917)
- October 7 — John "Cat" Thompson, American Hall of Fame college player (Montana State) (born 1906)
- October 11 — Ken Spain, American ABA player (Pittsburgh Condors) and Olympic gold medalist (1968) (born 1946)
- October 25 — Bennie Oosterbaan, All-American college player (Michigan) (born 1906)

== See also ==
- 1990 in sports
