= 1991 in basketball =

The following are the basketball events of the year 1991 throughout the world.

== Winners of major team competitions 1990–1991 ==
=== Men ===
NBA Regular Season

Portland Trail Blazers finished the regular season with the best record in the NBA with 63 wins and 19 losses and also led the Western Conference. The Chicago Bulls finished with the best record from the Eastern Conference with 61 wins and 21 losses. There were only 4 divisions in the NBA; Atlantic, Midwest, Central and Pacific. The Bulls and Trail Blazers won the Central and Pacific divisions respectively while the Boston Celtics and San Antonio Spurs won the Atlantic and Midwest divisions respectively. The Denver Nuggets had the worst record with 20 wins and 62 losses. However, they scored the most points; averaging 119.9 points per game. The Phoenix Suns set an NBA team record for most points in a regular season regulation game with 173 points against the Denver Nuggets. The Nuggets had the worst defense in the NBA, as they were allowing teams to score 130.9 points per game. Another record that was broken for this season was total assists for the whole season by John Stockton at 1164.

NBA Awards

Michael Jordan won the MVP award, earning 891 of 960 points possible. Magic Johnson of the Los Angeles Lakers finished 2nd in voting. Derrick Coleman won Rookie of the Year. Dennis Rodman won Defensive Player of the Year, Detlef Schrempf won Sixth Man of the Year and Scott Skiles won Most Improved Player.

NBA Playoffs

The first round of the 1991 Playoffs was still a best 3 out of 5 series. Portland Trail Blazers were tested and pushed to Game 5 before eventually beating the Seattle SuperSonics. The Chicago Bulls, Los Angeles Lakers, and Philadelphia 76ers were the only teams to sweep in the first round of the playoffs.

After the first round, rest of the series were 7 games and the first team to win 4 games would move on to the next round. The 2nd round provided no game 7's as the Bulls, Detroit Pistons, Lakers and Trail Blazers moved on. Bulls would go on to sweep the Pistons in the Eastern Conference Finals and the Lakers battled out 6 games to overcome the Trail Blazers.

The Finals was a match up between Chicago Bulls and Los Angeles Lakers. This was Michael Jordan's first appearance in the Finals and Magic Johnson's last trip. Johnson and the Lakers were no match for the Chicago Bulls as they lost 4 games to 1, giving Michael Jordan his first NBA Championship and his first finals MVP. After losing the first game of seven to the Los Angeles Lakers, Michael took his game to the next level. Over that five game span he averaged 31.2 points, 11.4 assists, 6.6 rebounds, 2.8 steals, and 1.4 blocks. This exceeded his average in the regular season where he averaged 31.5 pts, 5.5 assists, 6.0 rebounds, 2.7 steals, and 1.0 blocks. Magic Johnson also took his game to the next level where he averaged 18.6 pts, 12.4 assists, 8.0 rebounds, 1.2 steals, and 0 blocks, but in the end Michael reigned superior.

As for the whole playoffs, Michael Jordan also led the way with most points scored with 529. Dennis Rodman had the most rebounds at 177 while Magic Johnson finished with 1st in assists with 240.

Europe Champions

- Germany : Bayer Giants Leverkusen
- British BL : Kingston
- Belgium : RC Malines
- Bulgaria : PBC CSKA Sofia
- Spain : Joventut Badalona
- Saporta Cup : P.A.O.K. B.C.
- Euroleague Basketball : KK Split
- France : Olympique Antibes
- Greece : Aris B.C.
- Iceland : Njarðvík
- Israel : Maccabi Tel Aviv B.C.
- Italy : Juvecaserta Basket
- Korać Cup : Pallacanestro Cantù
- Netherlands : BC Den Helder
- Poland : Śląsk Wrocław
- Portugal : Benfica
- Sweden : Södertälje Kings
- Switzerland : Vevey Basket
- Czechoslovakia : USK Praha
- Turkey : Fenerbahçe Men's Basketball
- Soviet Union Basketball Championship : Kalev Tallinn
- Yugoslavia : KK Split

Americas Champions

- Argentina : GEPU San Luis
- Brazil : Franca
- CBA : Wichita Falls Texans
- NBA : Chicago Bulls
- NCAA : Duke Blue Devils
- Uruguay : Atlético Cordón
- USBL : Philadelphia Spirit
- Venezuela : Marinos de Oriente

Africa, Asia, Oceania Champions

- FIBA Africa Clubs Champions Cup : Joan of Arc
- Angola : CD 1° de Agosto
- Australia : Perth Wildcats
- Morocco : BMCI Basket Club
- New Zealand : Hutt Valley Lakers

=== Women ===
Europe Champions

- Germany : DJK Agon 08 Düsseldorf
- Belgium : BCSS Namur
- Spain : CB Godella
- EuroLeague Women : Unicar Cesena
- France : Challes-Les-Eaux
- Italy : SFT Côme
- Netherlands : BV Den Helder
- Poland : PZU Polfa Pabianice
- Ronchetti Cup : Gemeaz-Cusin Milan
- Sweden : Arvika Basket
- Czechoslovakia : MBK Ružomberok
- USSR : Dynamo Kiev

Americas Champions

- NCAA : Tennessee Volunteers

Africa, Asia, Oceania Champions

- Australia : Hobart Islanders

== Awards and honors ==
=== Professional ===
- Regular Season MVP
  - Michael Jordan, Chicago Bulls
- NBA Finals MVP
  - Michael Jordan, Chicago Bulls
- Slam Dunk Contest
  - Dee Brown, Boston Celtics
- Three-point Shootout
  - Craig Hodges, Chicago Bulls

=== Collegiate ===
- Men
  - John R. Wooden Award: Larry Johnson, UNLV
  - Naismith College Coach of the Year: Randy Ayers, Ohio State
  - Frances Pomeroy Naismith Award: Keith Jennings, East Tennessee State
  - Associated Press College Basketball Player of the Year: Shaquille O'Neal, LSU
  - NCAA basketball tournament Most Outstanding Player: Bobby Hurley, Duke
  - USBWA National Freshman of the Year: Rodney Rogers, Wake Forest
  - Associated Press College Basketball Coach of the Year: Randy Ayers, Ohio State
  - Naismith Outstanding Contribution to Basketball: Clarence "Big House" Gaines
- Women
  - Naismith College Player of the Year: Dawn Staley, Virginia
  - Naismith College Coach of the Year: Debbie Ryan, Virginia
  - Wade Trophy: Daedra Charles, Tennessee
  - Frances Pomeroy Naismith Award: Shanya Evans, Providence
  - NCAA basketball tournament Most Outstanding Player: Dawn Staley, Virginia
  - Basketball Academic All-America Team: Jan Jensen, Drake
  - Carol Eckman Award: Marian Washington, Kansas

=== Naismith Memorial Basketball Hall of Fame ===
- Class of 1991:
  - Nate Archibald
  - Dave Cowens
  - Harry Gallatin
  - Bob Knight

== Deaths ==
- June 9 — Howard Hobson, Hall of Fame college coach (Oregon, Yale) (born 1903)
- July 18 — Joel Eaves, American college coach (Auburn) (born 1914)
- November 2 — Jimmy Hull, College All-American (Ohio State) and 1939 NCAA tournament Most Outstanding Player (born 1917)
- December 17 — Carl Shy, American Olympic gold medalist (1936) (born 1908)

== See also ==
- 1991 in sports
