= 1993 in basketball =

The following are the basketball events of the year 1993 throughout the world.

== Championships ==
=== World Championship ===
- None*

=== Professional ===
- Men
  - 1993 NBA Finals: Chicago Bulls over the Phoenix Suns 4–2.
    - 1993 NBA Playoffs
    - 1992-93 NBA season
    - 1993 NBA draft
    - 1993 NBA All-Star Game
  - Eurobasket: Germany
- Women
  - Eurobasket Women: Spain def. France

=== College ===
- Men
  - NCAA
    - Division I: North Carolina 77, Michigan 71
    - NIT: University of Minnesota def. Georgetown University
    - Division II: California State University-Bakersfield 85, Troy State University 72
    - Division III: Ohio Northern University 71, Augustana College (Illinois) 68
  - NAIA
    - Division I Hawaii Pacific University 88, Oklahoma Baptist University 83
    - Division II Willamette University OR 63, Northern State University SD 56
  - NJCAA
    - Division I Pensacola Junior College 79, Butler Community College - Kansas 74
    - Division II Owens Technical College, OH 109, Northeastern Christian Junior College PA 85
    - Division III Onondaga Community College 84, Minneapolis CC MN 78
- Women
  - NCAA
    - Division I: Texas Tech University 84, Ohio State University 74
    - Division II: North Dakota State 95, Delta State University 63
    - Division III: Central College Iowa 71, Capital 63
  - NAIA
    - Division I: Arkansas Tech University 76, Union University TN 75
    - Division II: Montana State University - Northern 71, Northern State University (SD) 68
  - NJCAA
    - Division I Kilgore College 104, Louisburg College 99
    - Division II Illinois Central College 76, Kankakee Community College 71 OT
    - Division III Hudson Valley Community College 51, Quinsigamond Community College 50

== Awards and honors ==
=== Professional ===
- Men
  - NBA Most Valuable Player Award: Charles Barkley, Phoenix Suns
  - NBA Rookie of the Year Award: Shaquille O'Neal, Orlando Magic
  - NBA Defensive Player of the Year Award: Hakeem Olajuwon, Houston Rockets
  - NBA Coach of the Year Award: Pat Riley, New York Knicks

=== Collegiate ===
- Men
  - John R. Wooden Award: Calbert Cheaney, Indiana
  - Naismith College Coach of the Year: Dean Smith, North Carolina
  - Frances Pomeroy Naismith Award: Sam Crawford, New Mexico State
  - Associated Press College Basketball Player of the Year: Calbert Cheaney, Indiana
  - NCAA basketball tournament Most Outstanding Player: Corliss Williamson, Arkansas
  - USBWA National Freshman of the Year: Jason Kidd, California
  - Associated Press College Basketball Coach of the Year: Eddie Fogler, Vanderbilt
  - Naismith Outstanding Contribution to Basketball: Dave Gavitt
- Women
  - Naismith College Player of the Year: Sheryl Swoopes, Texas Tech
  - Naismith College Coach of the Year: C. Vivian Stringer, Iowa
  - Wade Trophy: Karen Jennings, Nebraska
  - Frances Pomeroy Naismith Award: Dena Evans, Virginia
  - NCAA basketball tournament Most Outstanding Player: Sheryl Swoopes, Texas Tech
  - Carol Eckman Award: C. Vivian Stringer, Iowa

=== Naismith Memorial Basketball Hall of Fame ===
- Class of 1993:
  - Walt Bellamy
  - Julius Erving
  - Dan Issel
  - Dick McGuire
  - Ann Meyers
  - Calvin Murphy
  - Uļjana Semjonova
  - Bill Walton

== Births ==
- March 7
  - Özge Kavurmacıoğlu, Turkish basketball player
  - Stefan Popovski-Turanjanin, Serbian basketball player
- May 11 – Maurice Harkless, American-Puerto Rican basketball player
- June 18 – Gianluca Marchetti, Italian professional basketball player

== Deaths ==
- January 3 — Johnny Most, Famed announcer for the Boston Celtics (born 1923)
- January 15 — Henry Iba, Hall of Fame college coach and two-time national champion (Oklahoma A&M) and three-time Olympic coach (born 1904)
- January 18 — Paul Hansen, 64, American college coach (Oklahoma City, Oklahoma State).
- January 19 — Chris Street, Iowa Hawkeyes forward (born 1972)
- January 22 — Jim Pollard, Hall of Fame player for the Minneapolis Lakers (born 1922)
- March 8 — Don Barksdale, College basketball's first African-American consensus All-American (UCLA) (born 1923)
- March 9 — Vanya Voynova, Bulgarian women's player and FIBA Hall of Fame member (born 1934)
- April 11 — Malcolm Wiseman, Canadian Olympic silver medalist (1936) (born 1913)
- April 28 — Jim Valvano, Coach of the 1983 National Champion NC State Wolfpack (born 1946)
- June 3 — Joe Fortenberry, member of 1936 US Olympic champion team (born 1911)
- June 7 — Mike Bloom, All-American college player (Temple), ABL, BAA player (born 1915)
- June 7 — Dražen Petrović, Croatian basketball star of the New Jersey Nets (born 1964)
- June 16 — Arad McCutchan, Hall of Fame coach of the five-time NCAA College Division national champion Evansville Purple Aces (born 1912)
- July 27 — Reggie Lewis, NBA All-Star from the Boston Celtics (born 1965)
- October 17 — Bill Reigel, AAU player and college coach (McNeese State) (born 1932)
- October 21 — Irv Torgoff, College All-American (Long Island), NBL, BAA player (born 1917)
- October 26 — Everett Dean, Hall of Fame coach of the 1942 NCAA Champion Stanford Indians (born 1898)
- November 26 — Tom Scott, American college coach (North Carolina, Davidson) (born 1908)
- November 28 — Robert Hawkins, NBA player (born 1954)
- December 9 — Matt Guokas, Sr., American player (Philadelphia Warriors) and announcer (born 1915)
- December 30 — George Stone, American ABA player (Utah Stars, Carolina Cougars) (born 1946)
