= 1989 in basketball =

The following are the basketball events of the year 1989 throughout the world.

== Winners of major team competitions 1988-1989 ==
=== Men ===
- Germany : BBC Bayreuth
- Spain : FC Barcelona Bàsquet
- France : Limoges CSP
- Italy : Olimpia Milano
- Philippines : San Miguel Beermen

== Player awards (NBA) ==
=== Regular season MVP ===
- Magic Johnson, Los Angeles Lakers

=== NBA Finals MVP ===
- Joe Dumars, Detroit Pistons

=== Slam Dunk Contest ===
- Kenny Walker, New York Knicks

=== Three-point Shootout ===
- Dale Ellis, Seattle SuperSonics

== Collegiate awards ==
- Men
  - John R. Wooden Award: Sean Elliott, Arizona
  - Naismith College Coach of the Year: Mike Krzyzewski, Duke
  - Frances Pomeroy Naismith Award: Tim Hardaway, UTEP
  - Associated Press College Basketball Player of the Year: Sean Elliott, Arizona
  - NCAA basketball tournament Most Outstanding Player: Anderson Hunt, UNLV
  - USBWA National Freshman of the Year: Chris Jackson, LSU
  - Associated Press College Basketball Coach of the Year: Bob Knight, Indiana
  - Naismith Outstanding Contribution to Basketball: Nat Holman
- Women
  - Naismith College Player of the Year: Clarissa Davis, Texas
  - Naismith College Coach of the Year: Pat Summitt, Tennessee
  - Wade Trophy: Clarissa Davis, Texas
  - Frances Pomeroy Naismith Award: Paulette Backstrom, Bowling Green
  - NCAA basketball tournament Most Outstanding Player: Bridgette Gordon, Tennessee
  - Carol Eckman Award: Linda Hill-MacDonald, Minnesota

== Naismith Memorial Basketball Hall of Fame ==
- Class of 1989:
  - William Gates
  - K.C. Jones
  - Lenny Wilkens

== Deaths ==
- April 8 — Horia Demian, Romanian club player (U Cluj) (born 1942)
- April 16 — Sam "Boom Boom" Wheeler, American professional player (Harlem Globetrotters, Harlem Magicians) (born 1923)
- April 23 — Norm Baker, Canadian BBA and PCPBL player (born 1923)
- July 26 — Bob Spessard, All-American college player and coach (Washington and Lee) (born 1915)
- August 14 — Ricky Berry, American NBA player (Sacramento Kings) (born 1964)
- August 21 — Scott Fenton, Australian player (Perth Wildcats) (born 1964)
- September 7 — Valery Goborov, Soviet player (born 1966)
- September 22 — Bob Calihan, All-American college player and coach (Detroit), NBL player (born 1918)
- October 7 — Earl Thomas, American NBL player (born 1915)
- October 8 — Oscar Moglia, Uruguayan Olympic and club player (Club Atlético Welcome) (born 1935)
- October 12 — Rolando Bacigalupo, Peruvian Olympic player (born 1914)
- October 30 — Douglas Legg, British Olympic player (born 1914)
- October 30 — Raymond Offner, French Olympic player (born 1927)
- December 3 — Fernando Martín Espina, Spanish player (Real Madrid, Portland Trail Blazers) (born 1962)
- Date unknown — Liviu Naghy, Romanian Olympic player (born 1929)

== See also ==
- 1989 in sports
