= 2009 in basketball =

The following are the basketball events of the year 2009 throughout the world.

Tournaments include international (FIBA), professional (club) and amateur and collegiate levels.

== Tournaments ==
=== Men's tournaments ===
==== Other tournaments ====
- All-Africa Games at
- Pan American Games at
- Southeast Asian Games at
- Southeast Asia Basketball Association Championship 2009 at

=== Women's tournaments ===
==== Olympic qualifiers ====
- FIBA Africa Championship for Women 2009 at
- FIBA Americas Championship for Women 2009 at
- FIBA Asia Championship for Women 2009 at
- EuroBasket Women 2009 at
- FIBA Oceania Championship for Women 2009 at

==== Other tournaments ====
- Pan American Games at
- Southeast Asian Games at
- Southeast Asia Basketball Association Championship for Women 2009 at

=== Youth tournaments ===
- FIBA Under-19 World Championship in Auckland, New Zealand
  - (gold) United States (silver) Greece (bronze) Croatia
  - All-tournament team:
    - (Croatia) Mario Delaš
    - (United States) Gordon Hayward
    - (Greece) Nikolaos Pappas
    - (United States) Tyshawn Taylor
    - (Croatia) Toni Prostran
- FIBA Under-19 World Championship for Women in Thailand
- FIBA Under-21 World Championship for Women at

== Club championships ==
=== Intercontinental championships ===
- Euroleague: (Greece) Panathinaikos
- Eurocup: (Lithuania) Lietuvos Rytas
- EuroChallenge: (Italy) Virtus Bologna
- Asia Champions Cup: (Iran) Mahram Tehran
- Liga Sudamericana: (Brazil) Flamengo

=== National championships ===
Men:

- (United States) (Canada) NBA
  - Season:
    - Division champions: Boston Celtics (Atlantic), Cleveland Cavaliers (Central), Orlando Magic (Southeast), Denver Nuggets (Northwest), Los Angeles Lakers (Pacific), San Antonio Spurs (Southwest)
    - Best regular-season record: Cleveland Cavaliers (66–16)
    - Eastern Conference: Orlando Magic
    - Western Conference: Los Angeles Lakers
  - Finals: The Lakers defeat the Magic 4–1, giving Phil Jackson a record 10th NBA title as a head coach. The Lakers' Kobe Bryant is named Finals MVP.
- (Argentina) Liga Nacional de Básquet, 2008–09 season:
  - Regular season: Atenas
  - Playoffs: Atenas defeat Peñarol 4–2 in the best-of-seven final.
- (Australia) National Basketball League, 2008–09 season:
  - Premiers: South Dragons
  - Champions: South Dragons defeat Melbourne Tigers 3–2 in the best-of-five Grand Final.
- Basketball League Belgium: Spirou Charleroi defeat Dexia Mons-Hainaut 3–0 in the best-of-five final.
- (China) Chinese Basketball Association, 2008–09 season: Guangdong Southern Tigers defeat the Xinjiang Flying Tigers 4–1 in the best-of-seven final.
- (Croatia) Croatian League: Cibona defeat Zadar 3–1 in the best-of-five final.
- (Czech Republic) Czech League: ČEZ Nymburk defeat Geofin Nový Jičín 4–0 in the best-of-seven final.
- (Netherlands) Dutch Eredivisie: MyGuide Amsterdam defeat EiffelTowers Den Bosch 4–3 in the best-of-seven final.
- (Estonia) Estonian League, 2008–09: Kalev/Cramo defeat TÜ/Rock 4–2 in the best-of-7 final.
- (France) French Pro A League: ASVEL Basket defeat Orléans 55–41 in the one-off final.
- (Germany) German Bundesliga: EWE Baskets Oldenburg defeat Telekom Baskets Bonn 3–2 in the best-of-five final.
- (Greece) Greek League, 2008–09 season: Panathinaikos defeat Olympiacos 3–1 in the best-of-five final.
- (Iran) Iranian Super League, 2008–09 season: Mahram defeat Zob Ahan 2–0 in the best-of-three final.
- (Israel) Israeli Super League, 2008–09 season: Maccabi Tel Aviv defeat Maccabi Haifa 85–72 in the one-off final.
- (Italy) Italian Serie A, 2008–09 season: Montepaschi Siena defeat Armani Jeans Milano 4–0 in the best-of-seven final. Montepaschi complete a treble of trophies, having also won the Italian Supercup and Italian Cup; they lost only one out of 44 matches across all domestic competitions this season.
- (Lithuania) Lithuanian LKL: Lietuvos Rytas Vilnius defeat Žalgiris Kaunas 4–1 in the best-of-seven final.
- Montenegro League: Budućnost Podgorica defeat Primorje 3–0 in the best-of-five final.
- (Philippines) Philippine Basketball Association, 2008–09 season:
  - Philippine Cup: The Talk 'N Text Tropang Texters defeat the Alaska Aces 4–3 in the best-of-seven final.
  - Fiesta Conference: The San Miguel Beermen defeat the Barangay Ginebra Kings 4–3 in the best-of-seven final.
- (Poland) Polish League: Asseco Prokom Sopot defeat Turów Zgorzelec 4–1 in the best-of-seven final.
- (Russia) Russian Super League: CSKA Moscow defeat Khimki Moscow Region 3–1 in the best-of-five final.
- Serbia Super League: Partizan Belgrade defeat Red Star Belgrade 3–2 in the best-of-five final.
- (Slovenia) Slovenian League: Union Olimpija defeat Helios Domžale 3–0 in the best-of-five final.
- (Spain) Spanish ACB:
  - Season: TAU Cerámica
  - Playoffs: Regal FC Barcelona defeat TAU Cerámica 3–1 in the best-of-five final.
- (Turkey) Turkish Basketball League: Efes Pilsen defeat Fenerbahçe Ülker 4–2 in the best-of-seven final.
- (Ukraine) Ukrainian Super League: Azovmash Mariupol defeat BC Donetsk 3–0 in the best-of-five final.
- (United Kingdom) British Basketball League, 2008–09:
  - Season: Newcastle Eagles
  - Playoffs: Newcastle Eagles defeat Everton Tigers 87–84 in the one-off final.
- (Bosnia and Herzegovina) (Croatia) (Montenegro) (Serbia) (Slovenia) Adriatic League: Partizan Belgrade (Serbia) defeat Cibona Zagreb (Croatia) 63–49 in the one-off final.
- (Estonia) (Latvia) (Lithuania) (Sweden) Baltic League: Lietuvos Rytas Vilnius (Lithuania) defeat Žalgiris Kaunas (Lithuania) 97–74 in the one-off final.

Women:

- (United States) WNBA
  - Season:
    - Eastern Conference: Indiana Fever
    - Western Conference and best regular-season record: Phoenix Mercury
  - Finals: The Mercury defeat the Fever 3–2 for their second title in three years. The Mercury's Diana Taurasi is named Finals MVP.
- 2008–09 EuroLeague Women: Spartak Moscow (Russia)

=== College ===
Men:

Country	League / Tournament	Champion	Runner-up	Result	Playoff format
Canada	2009 CIS Men's Basketball Championship	Carleton Ravens	UBC Thunderbirds	87–77	Single-game final
Philippines	UAAP Season 72	Ateneo Blue Eagles	UE Red Warriors	2–1	Best-of-three series
Philippines	NCAA Season 85	San Sebastian Stags	San Beda Red Lions	2–0	Best-of-three series
United States	NCAA Division I	North Carolina Tar Heels	Michigan State Spartans	89–72	Single-game final
United States	National Invitation Tournament	Penn State Lions	Baylor	69–63	Single-game final
United States	College Basketball Invitational	Oregon State	UTEP	2–1	Best-of-three series
United States	CollegeInsider.com Tournament	Old Dominion	Bradley	66–62	Single-game final
United States	NCAA Division II	Findlay	Cal Poly Pomona	56–53 (OT)	Single-game final
United States	NCAA Division III	Washington University (SL)	Stockton University	61–52	Single-game final
United States	NAIA Division I	Rocky Mountain College (MT)	Columbia College (MO)	77–61	Single-game final
United States	NAIA Division II	Oklahoma Wesleyan University	Ozarks College (MO)	60–53	Single-game final
United States	NJCAA Division I	Salt Lake Comm. College (UT)	Midland College (TX)	67–60	Single-game final
United States	NJCAA Division II	Johnson County Comm. College	Kirkwood Community College	63–49	Single-game final
United States	NJCAA Division III	Richland College (TX)	Minneapolis ComTech College (MN)	58–57	Single-game final

Women:

- (United States) NCAA
  - Division I: Connecticut 76, Louisville 54
    - Most Outstanding Player: Tina Charles, UConn
  - WNIT: South Florida 75, Kansas 71
  - Division II: Minnesota State-Mankato 103, Franklin Pierce 94
  - Division III: George Fox 60, Washington (MO) 53
- (United States) NAIA
  - NAIA Division I: Union College (TN) 73, Lambuth University (TN) 63
  - NAIA Division II: Morningside College (IA) 68, Hastings College (NE) 63
- (United States) NJCAA
  - Division I: Central Arizona College 78, Jefferson College 71
  - Division II: Kirkwood Community College 62, Schoolcraft College 38
  - Division III: Rochester Community & Technical College 87, Madison Area Technical College 63
- (Philippines) UAAP Women's: Adamson defeats FEU in the best of three finals 2–0

=== Prep ===
- (United States) USA Today Boys Basketball Ranking #1:
- (United States) USA Today Girls Basketball Ranking #1:
- NCAA (Philippines) Juniors:
- (Philippines) UAAP Juniors: Ateneo defeats DLSZ in the best of three finals 2–1

== Awards and honors ==
=== Basketball Hall of Fame ===
- Class of 2009:
  - Players: Michael Jordan, David Robinson, John Stockton
  - Coaches: Jerry Sloan, C. Vivian Stringer

=== Women's Basketball Hall of Fame ===
- Class of 2009
  - Jennifer Azzi
  - Cynthia Cooper
  - Jennifer Gillom
  - Sonja Hogg
  - Jill Hutchison
  - Ora Washington

=== FIBA Hall of Fame ===
- Class of 2009
- Players
- Jacky Chazalon

- Oscar Robertson
- Ricardo González
- Ubiratan Pereira

- Coaches

- Kay Yow
- Pedro Ferrándiz
- Pete Newell

- Referees

- Artenik Arabadjian
- Marcel Pfeuti

- Contributors

- Al Ramsay

=== Professional ===
- Men
  - NBA Most Valuable Player Award: LeBron James, Cleveland Cavaliers
  - NBA Rookie of the Year Award: Derrick Rose, Chicago Bulls
  - NBA Defensive Player of the Year Award: Dwight Howard, Orlando Magic
  - NBA Sixth Man of the Year Award: Jason Terry, Dallas Mavericks
  - NBA Most Improved Player Award: Danny Granger, Indiana Pacers
  - NBA Coach of the Year Award: Mike Brown, Cleveland Cavaliers
  - FIBA Europe Player of the Year Award: Pau Gasol, Spain and Los Angeles Lakers
  - Euroscar Award: Pau Gasol, Spain and Los Angeles Lakers
  - Mr. Europa: Pau Gasol, Spain and Los Angeles Lakers
- Women
  - WNBA Most Valuable Player Award: Diana Taurasi, Phoenix Mercury
  - WNBA Defensive Player of the Year Award: Tamika Catchings, Indiana Fever
  - WNBA Rookie of the Year Award: Angel McCoughtry, Atlanta Dream
  - WNBA Sixth Woman of the Year Award: DeWanna Bonner, Phoenix Mercury
  - WNBA Most Improved Player Award: Crystal Langhorne, Washington Mystics
  - Kim Perrot Sportsmanship Award: Kara Lawson, Sacramento Monarchs
  - WNBA Coach of the Year Award: Marynell Meadors, Atlanta Dream
  - WNBA All-Star Game MVP: Swin Cash, Seattle Storm
  - WNBA Finals Most Valuable Player Award: Diana Taurasi, Phoenix Mercury
  - FIBA Europe Player of the Year Award: Sandrine Gruda, France, (Russia) UMMC Ekaterinburg, and Connecticut Sun

=== Collegiate ===
- Combined
  - Legends of Coaching Award: Rick Barnes, Texas
- Men
  - John R. Wooden Award: Blake Griffin, Oklahoma
  - Naismith College Coach of the Year: Jamie Dixon, Pittsburgh
  - Frances Pomeroy Naismith Award: Darren Collison, UCLA
  - Associated Press College Basketball Player of the Year: Blake Griffin, Oklahoma
  - NCAA basketball tournament Most Outstanding Player: Kyle Singler, Duke
  - USBWA National Freshman of the Year: Tyreke Evans, Memphis
  - Associated Press College Basketball Coach of the Year: Bill Self, Kansas
  - Naismith Outstanding Contribution to Basketball: Billy Packer
- Women
  - John R. Wooden Award: Maya Moore, Connecticut
  - Naismith College Player of the Year: Maya Moore, Connecticut
  - Naismith College Coach of the Year: Geno Auriemma, Connecticut
  - Wade Trophy: Maya Moore, Connecticut
  - Frances Pomeroy Naismith Award: Renee Montgomery, Connecticut
  - Associated Press Women's College Basketball Player of the Year: Maya Moore, Connecticut
  - NCAA basketball tournament Most Outstanding Player: Tina Charles, UConn
  - Basketball Academic All-America Team: Amber Guffey, Murray State
  - Carol Eckman Award: Muffet McGraw, Notre Dame
  - Maggie Dixon Award: Kelly Packard, Ball State
  - USBWA National Freshman of the Year: Shekinna Stricklen, Tennessee
  - Associated Press College Basketball Coach of the Year: Geno Auriemma, Connecticut
  - List of Senior CLASS Award women's basketball winners: Courtney Paris, Oklahoma
  - Nancy Lieberman Award: Renee Montgomery, Connecticut
  - Naismith Outstanding Contribution to Basketball: Anne Donovan

== Events ==
- The Italian club Nuova Sebastiani Basket moves from the central Italian city of Rieti to the major southern city of Naples, effective with the 2009–10 season.
- October 20 – The WNBA announces that the Detroit Shock has been purchased by a group of investors from Tulsa, Oklahoma and will move to that city for the 2010 season. In January 2010, the team would be unveiled as the Tulsa Shock.

== Movies ==
- Hurricane Season
- The Mighty Macs
- Streetballers
- The Winning Season

== Deaths ==
- January 29 — Kay Yow, Hall of Fame coach of the NC State Lady Wolfpack (born 1942)
- February 5 — Mel Thompson, American college coach (The Citadel) (born 1932)
- February 20 — Larry H. Miller, American businessman, owner of the Utah Jazz (born 1944)
- February 26 — Johnny Kerr, Former NBA player, coach and Chicago Bulls announcer (born 1932)
- February 26 — Norm Van Lier, Former NBA player and announcer (born 1947)
- March 13 — William Davidson, American businessman, owner of the Detroit Pistons and Hall of Famer (born 1923)
- April 4 — Marvin Webster, The "Human Eraser" was a 10-year NBA vet and Division II National Champion at Morgan State University (born 1952)
- April 16 — Reggie Royals, ABA player (San Diego Conquistadors) (born 1950)
- April 27 — Glen Gondrezick, Former NBA and UNLV guard (born 1955)
- April 29 — Alexander Athas, American basketball player and sports celebrity (born 1922)
- April 30 — Hal Perry, Starting guard on San Francisco's back to back national championship teams (1955 & 1956) (born 1933)
- May 9 — Chuck Daly, Two-time NBA Champion coach of the Detroit Pistons and coach of the 1992 US Olympic team (born 1930)
- May 15 — Wayman Tisdale, American player, member of the College Basketball Hall of Fame and 12-year NBA veteran; also a renowned jazz bass guitarist (born 1964)
- May 21 — DeWitt Menyard, American ABA player (Houston Mavericks) (born 1944)
- June 4 — Randy Smith, Former All-Star guard for the Buffalo Braves (born 1948)
- July 27 — Dick Holub, Former Fairleigh Dickinson coach and All-American player at LIU (born 1921)
- August 11 — Kirby Minter, American basketball player, MVP of the 1954 FIBA World Championship (born 1929)
- August 13 — Lavelle Felton, American basketball player (born 1980)
- August 17 — Paul Hogue, All-American and 1962 NCAA Tournament Most Outstanding Player at Cincinnati (born 1940)
- August 19 — Harry Kermode, Canadian Olympic player (1948) (born 1922)
- September 29 — Ebony Dickinson, American basketball player (born 1977)
- October 19 — Joe Hutton, American NBA player (Minneapolis Lakers) (born 1928)
- October 19 — Angelo Musi, NBA (Philadelphia Warriors) and ABL player (born 1918)
- October 23 — Ron Sobieszczyk, former member of the New York Knicks and Minneapolis Lakers (born 1934)
- October 30 — Howie Schultz, member of two NBA championship teams with the Minneapolis Lakers (born 1922)
- November 1 — Jonathan Bourhis, French player (JDA Dijon Basket) (born 1990)
- November 1 — Alan Ogg, former UAB and Miami Heat center (born 1967)
- November 9 — Al Cervi, Hall of Fame player and coach of the 1955 NBA Champion Syracuse Nationals (born 1917)
- November 18 — Red Robbins, Tennessee standout and ABA player (born 1944)
- November 22 — Bob Armstrong, American NBL player (Youngstown Bears) (born 1920)
- November 24 — Abe Pollin, Owner of the Washington Wizards and Washington Mystics (born 1923)
- December 8 — Fred Sheffield, BAA player (Philadelphia Warriors) (born 1923)
- December 28 — Zoltán Horváth, Hungarian player (born 1979)

== See also ==
- Timeline of women's basketball
