= 2001 in basketball =

The following are the basketball events of the year 2001 throughout the world.

== Championships ==
=== Professional ===
- Men
  - 2001 NBA Finals: Los Angeles Lakers over the Philadelphia 76ers 4-1. MVP: Shaquille O'Neal
    - 2000–01 NBA season, 2001 NBA Playoffs, 2001 NBA draft, 2001 NBA All-Star Game
  - Eurobasket: Yugoslavia 78, Turkey 69
- Women
  - WNBA Finals: Los Angeles Sparks over the Charlotte Sting 2-0. MVP: Lisa Leslie
    - 2001 WNBA season, 2001 WNBA Playoffs, 2001 WNBA draft, 2001 WNBA All-Star Game
  - Eurobasket Women: France def. Russia

=== College ===
- Men
  - NCAA Division I: Duke University 82, Arizona 72
  - National Invitation Tournament: University of Tulsa 79, University of Alabama 60
  - NCAA Division II: Kentucky Wesleyan College 72, Washburn University 63
  - NCAA Division III: Catholic 76, William Paterson College 62
  - NAIA Division I: Faulkner University 63, Oklahoma Science & Arts 59
  - NAIA Division II: Northwestern (Iowa) 82, MidAmerica Nazarene University (Kan.) 78
- Women
  - NCAA Division I: University of Notre Dame 68, Purdue University 66
  - NCAA Division II: Cal Poly Pomona 87, North Dakota State University 80 (OT)
  - NCAA Division III Washington (Mo.) 67, Messiah College 45
  - NAIA Division I: Oklahoma City University 69, Auburn University Montgomery (Ala.) 52
  - NAIA Division II Hastings College (Neb.) 73, Cornerstone University (Mich.) 69

== Awards and honors ==
=== Professional ===
- Men
  - NBA Most Valuable Player Award: Allen Iverson
  - NBA Rookie of the Year Award: Mike Miller
  - NBA Defensive Player of the Year Award: Ben Wallace
  - NBA Coach of the Year Award: Larry Brown, Philadelphia 76ers
  - Euroscar Award: Peja Stojaković, Sacramento Kings and FR Yugoslavia
  - Mr. Europa: Peja Stojaković, Sacramento Kings and FR Yugoslavia
- Women
  - WNBA Most Valuable Player Award: Lisa Leslie, Los Angeles Sparks
  - WNBA Defensive Player of the Year Award: Debbie Black, Miami Sol
  - WNBA Rookie of the Year Award: Jackie Stiles, Portland Fire
  - WNBA Most Improved Player Award: Janeth Arcain, Houston Comets
  - Kim Perrot Sportsmanship Award: Sue Wicks, New York Liberty
  - WNBA Coach of the Year Award: Dan Hughes, Cleveland Rockers
  - WNBA All-Star Game MVP: Lisa Leslie, Los Angeles Sparks
  - WNBA Finals Most Valuable Player Award: Lisa Leslie, Los Angeles Sparks

=== Collegiate ===
- Combined
  - Legends of Coaching Award: Lute Olson, Arizona
- Men
  - John R. Wooden Award: Shane Battier, Duke
  - Naismith College Coach of the Year: Rod Barnes, Mississippi
  - Frances Pomeroy Naismith Award: Rashad Phillips, Detroit
  - Associated Press College Basketball Player of the Year: Shane Battier, Duke
  - NCAA basketball tournament Most Outstanding Player: Juan Dixon, Maryland
  - USBWA National Freshman of the Year: Eddie Griffin, Seton Hall
  - Associated Press College Basketball Coach of the Year: Matt Doherty, North Carolina
  - Naismith Outstanding Contribution to Basketball: Tex Winter
- Women
  - Naismith College Player of the Year: Ruth Riley, Notre Dame
  - Naismith College Coach of the Year: Muffet McGraw, Notre Dame
  - Wade Trophy: Jackie Stiles, Missouri State
  - Frances Pomeroy Naismith Award: Niele Ivey, Notre Dame
  - Associated Press Women's College Basketball Player of the Year: Ruth Riley, Notre Dame
  - NCAA basketball tournament Most Outstanding Player: Ruth Riley, Notre Dame
  - Basketball Academic All-America Team: Ruth Riley, Notre Dame
  - Carol Eckman Award: Juliene B. Simpson, East Stroudsburg University
  - Associated Press College Basketball Coach of the Year: Muffet McGraw, Notre Dame
  - Nancy Lieberman Award: Sue Bird, Connecticut
  - Naismith Outstanding Contribution to Basketball: Cathy Rush

=== Naismith Memorial Basketball Hall of Fame ===
- Class of 2001:
  - John Chaney
  - Michael "Mike" Krzyzewski
  - Moses E. Malone

=== Women's Basketball Hall of Fame ===
- Class of 2001

- Van Chancellor
- Theresa Grentz
- Phyllis Holmes
- LaTaunya Pollard
- Linda K. Sharp
- C. Vivian Stringer
- Vanya Voynova
- Hazel Walker
- Rosie Walker
- Holly Warlick

== Movies ==
- Pistol Pete: The Life and Times of Pete Maravich

== Deaths ==
- January 7 — Ken Durrett, American NBA player and All-American at La Salle University (born 1948)
- January 17 — Garland O'Shields, American NBA player (Chicago Stags, Syracuse Nationals) (born 1921)
- January 26 — Al McGuire, Hall of Fame coach at Marquette and famed college basketball announcer (born 1928)
- February 3 — Bobby Colburn, American NBL player for the Dayton Metropolitans (born 1911)
- February 19 — Guy Rodgers, Hall of Fame player for the Philadelphia and San Francisco Warriors (born 1935)
- February 20 — Harry Boykoff, former St. John's and early NBA player (born 1922)
- April 25 — Clovis Stark, American NBL for the Dayton Metropolitans (born 1914)
- April 29 — Andy Phillip, Hall of Fame NBA player (born 1922)
- May 15 — Ralph Miller, Hall of Fame college coach at Wichita State, Iowa and Oregon State (born 1919)
- June 26 — George Senesky, NBA player and coach for the Philadelphia Warriors (born 1922)
- August 1 — Dwight Eddleman, All-American at Illinois and two-time NBA All-Star (born 1922)
- September 5 — Cawood Ledford, American radio announcer (Kentucky Wildcats) (born 1926)
- September 14 — George Ireland, coach of the 1963 NCAA national champion Loyola Ramblers (born 1913)
- October 13 — B. L. Graham, All-American college player and head coach (Ole Miss Rebels) (born 1914)
- October 20 — Nebojša Popović, Serbian player, coach and administrator and FIBA Hall of Fame member (born 1923)
- November 18 — Renato Righetto, Brazilian referee and FIBA Hall of Fame member (born 1921)
- November 23 — Gus Broberg, two-time All-American forward at Dartmouth College (born 1920)
- November 28 — Bob Cope, American college coach (Montana) (born 1928)
- December 8 — Mirza Delibašić, FIBA Hall of Fame player from Bosnia and 1980 Olympic Gold Medalist (born 1954)
- December 10 — Gus Doerner, American NBL player (Fort Wayne Pistons, Indianapolis Kautskys) (born 1922)
- December 13 – Larry Costello, American All-Star NBA player (Philadelphia 76ers) (born 1931)
