= Ed Douma =

American basketball coach

Biographical details
- Born: January 2, 1945 (age 81); Rotterdam, Netherlands

Playing career
- 1962–1966: Calvin

Coaching career (HC unless noted)
- 1970–1972: Shelby HS
- 1972–1973: Western Michigan (assistant)
- 1973–1974: Alma
- 1974–1978: Lake Superior State
- 1978–1982: Kent State
- 1982–1984: UNC Greensboro
- 1984–1996: Calvin
- 1998–2007: Hillsdale
- 2009–2014: Ferris State (volunteer asst.)

Head coaching record
- Overall: 555–302 (.648)

Accomplishments and honors

Championships
- NCAA Division III tournament (1992); 2 GLIAC (1976, 1978); 6 MIAA regular season (1986, 1989, 1990, 1992–1994); 3 MIAA tournament (1992–1994)

Awards
- NABC Division III Coach of the Year (1992); 3× GLIAC Coach of the Year (1976, 1978, 2001)

Ed Douma (born January 2, 1945) is an American former college basketball coach. He compiled a 555–302 record in 34 seasons as a head coach, including an NCAA Division III National Championship with Calvin in 1992.

Born in Rotterdam, the Netherlands, Douma grew up in Michigan and played college basketball at Calvin College (now Calvin University). He began his coaching career at Shelby High School, where he won two state championships behind star Paul Griffin. Douma parlayed this success to gain an assistant position at Western Michigan, then was named head coach at Alma and Lake Superior State before being named head coach at Division I Kent State. Douma coached four seasons, compiling a record of 46–60, before being fired following the 1981–82 season. He then landed at Division III UNC Greensboro for two seasons before returning to his alma mater in 1984.

At Calvin, Douma made the Knights one of the most consistent teams in the Michigan Intercollegiate Athletic Association (MIAA). In 12 seasons under Douma, the Knights won the league six times and only finished below second place once. In the 1991–92 season, Calvin went 31–1 and won the program’s first national championship and Douma was named NABC Coach of the Year. Following the 1995–96 season, Douma retired at age 51 with a 254–72 record in his 12 seasons.

Douma returned to coaching in 1998 to coach Hillsdale for nine seasons, retiring again in 2007. He returned from retirement a second time to serve as a volunteer assistant for his former player Bill Sall, at Ferris State from 2009 to 2014.
