= 1992 NCAA Division II women's basketball tournament =

American collegiate basketball tournament

- Teams: 32
- Finals site: , Fargo, North Dakota
- Champions: Delta State Lady Statesmen (3rd title)
- Runner-up: North Dakota State Bison (3rd title game)
- Third place: Portland State Vikings (1st Final Four)
- Fourth place: Bentley Falcons (4th Final Four)
- Winning coach: Lloyd Clark, DSU (3rd title)
- MOP: Leslie McKiernon (Delta State)

The 1992 NCAA Division II women's basketball tournament was the 11th annual tournament hosted by the NCAA to determine the national champion of Division II women's collegiate basketball in the United States.

Delta State defeated defending champions North Dakota State in the championship game, 65–63, claiming the Lady Statesmen's third NCAA Division II national title. It was also Delta State's third title in four seasons.

The championship rounds were contested in Fargo, North Dakota.

== Regionals ==
=== Great Lakes - Rensselaer, Indiana ===
Location: Richard Sharf Alumni Fieldhouse Host: Saint Joseph's College

Regional semifinals Round of 32; March 13
Michigan Tech	66
St. Joseph's (IN)	76
Northern Kentucky	69
Northern Michigan	73

Regional final Sweet 16; March 14
St. Joseph's (IN)	86
Northern Michigan	74

=== West - Portland, Oregon ===
Location: PSU Gym Host: Portland State University

Regional semifinals Round of 32; March 13
Alaska Anchorage	76
Portland State	101
UC Davis	69
Cal Poly Pomona	49

Regional final Sweet 16; March 14
Portland State	83
UC Davis	56

=== North Central - Fargo, North Dakota ===
Location: Bison Sports Arena Host: North Dakota State University

Regional semifinals Round of 32; March 13
North Dakota State	92
South Dakota State	58
Augustana (SD)	83
Nebraska–Omaha	70

Regional final Sweet 16; March 14
North Dakota State	104
Augustana (SD)	69

=== South Central - Pittsburg, Kansas ===
Location: John Lance Arena Host: Pittsburg State University

Regional semifinals Round of 32; March 13
IPFW	67
Washburn	82
Pittsburg State	69
West Texas State	76

Regional final Sweet 16; March 14
Washburn	56
West Texas State	54

=== New England - Waltham, Massachusetts ===
Location: Dana Center Host: Bentley College

Regional semifinals Round of 32; March 13
St. Augustine's	74
Stonehill	96
Bentley	73
Franklin Pierce	65

Regional final Sweet 16; March 14
Stonehill	60
Bentley	68

=== East - Johnstown, Pennsylvania ===
Location: Sports Center Host: University of Pittsburgh at Johnstown

Regional semifinals Round of 32; March 13
Clarion	85
Edinboro	70
Pace	50
Pitt Johnstown	93

Regional final Sweet 16; March 14
Clarion	73
Pitt Johnstown	75

=== South Atlantic - Norfolk, Virginia ===
Location: Joseph G. Echols Memorial Hall Host: Norfolk State University

Regional semifinals Round of 32; March 13
Bloomsburg	50
North Dakota	79
Johnson C. Smith	71
Norfolk State	108

Regional final Sweet 16; March 14
North Dakota	63
Norfolk State	48

=== South - Carrollton, Georgia ===
Location: Health and Physical Education Building Host: University of West Georgia

Regional semifinals Round of 32; March 13
Delta State	97
Florida Tech	70
Fort Valley State	68
West Georgia	96

Regional final Sweet 16; March 14
Delta State	73
West Georgia	53

== National Finals - Fargo, North Dakota ==
Final Four Location: Bison Sports Arena Host: North Dakota State University

National quarterfinals Elite Eight; March 21
St. Joseph's (IN)	62
Portland State	83
Portland, Oregon; Fargo, North Dakota
North Dakota State	79
Washburn	51
Bentley	90
Pitt Johnstown	73
Waltham, Mass. Cleveland, Mississippi
North Dakota	55
Delta State	63

National semifinals Final Four; March 27
Portland State	59
North Dakota State	93
Bentley	66
Delta State	68

National championship March 28
North Dakota State	63
Delta State	65
Third place
Portland State	72
Bentley	69

== All-tournament team ==
- Leslie McKiernon, Delta State
- LaTanya Patty, Delta State
- Nadine Schmidt, North Dakota State
- Sherri Stemple, Portland State
- Jody Buck, North Dakota State
- Tracie Seymour, Bentley

== See also ==
- 1992 NCAA Division II men's basketball tournament
- 1992 NCAA Division I women's basketball tournament
- 1992 NCAA Division III women's basketball tournament
- 1992 NAIA Division I women's basketball tournament
- 1992 NAIA Division II women's basketball tournament
