= 1992 NAIA Division II women's basketball tournament =

- Teams: 20
- Finals site: Physical Education Building, Monmouth, Oregon
- Champions: Northern State Wolves (1st title, 1st title game, 2nd Fab Four)
- Runner-up: Tarleton State TexAnns (1st title game, 1st Fab Four)
- Semifinalists: Mount St. Joseph Lions (1st Fab Four); Western Oregon Wolves (1st Fab Four)
- Coach of the year: Curt Frederickson (Northern State)
- Charles Stevenson Hustle Award: Amy Sutter (Mount St. Joseph)
- Chuck Taylor MVP: Barb Schmidt (Northern State)
- Top scorer: Barb Schmidt (Northern State) (76 points)

The 1992 NAIA Division I women's basketball tournament was the tournament held by the NAIA to determine the national champion of women's college basketball among its Division II members in the United States and Canada for the 1991–92 basketball season.

This was the first tournament held exclusively for Division II teams; a separate tournament was held concurrently for the teams the NAIA sorted into its Division I.

Northern State (SD) defeated Tarleton State in the championship game, 73–65, to claim the Wolves' first NAIA national title.

The tournament was played at the Physical Education Building at Western Oregon State College in Monmouth, Oregon.

== Qualification ==
The tournament field for the inaugural Division II championship was set at 20 teams, a decrease of 12 teams from the last single-division NAIA tournament in 1991. The top eight teams received seeds, with the top four receiving a bye. The lowest ranked teams were placed in a preliminary first round.

The tournament utilized a single-elimination format.

== Bracket ==
First round
Culver–Stockton	93
Florida Memorial	75
St. Joseph's (ME)	94
Concordia (NE)	78
Aquinas (MI)	63
Bloomfield	48
Wilmington (DE)	76
Olivet Nazarene	67

Second round
1	Northern Montana	104
Culver–Stockton	58
Concordia (WI)	70
8	Mount St. Joseph	83
5	Tabor	53
Pacific (OR)	71
St. Joseph's (ME)	70
4	Tarleton State	81
3	Indiana Tech	64
Aquinas (MI)	63
Tusculum	60
6	Northern State (SD)	110
7	Western Oregon	81
Cardinal Stritch	61
Wilmington (DE)	61
2	Mount Mercy	99

Quarterfinals
1	Northern Montana	75
8	Mount St. Joseph	77
Pacific (OR)	66
4	Tarleton State	68*
3	Indiana Tech	51
6	Northern State (SD)	71
7	Western Oregon	90
2	Mount Mercy	76

Semifinals
8	Mount St. Joseph	72
4	Tarleton State	91
6	Northern State (SD)	76
7	Western Oregon	64

National championship
4	Tarleton State	56
6	Northern State (SD)	73

== See also ==
- 1992 NAIA Division II men's basketball tournament
- 1992 NCAA Division I women's basketball tournament
- 1992 NCAA Division II women's basketball tournament
- 1992 NCAA Division III women's basketball tournament
- 1992 NAIA Division I women's basketball tournament
