= Kelly Packard (basketball) =

American basketball player and coach

Biographical details
- Education: Anderson University (class of 1990)

Coaching career (HC unless noted)
- 1991–1993: Colorado State (asst.)
- 1996–1999: Colorado State (asst.)
- 2004–2006: Colorado Chill
- 2008–2012: Ball State
- 2013–2016: Taylor

Accomplishments and honors

Championships
- 2x NWBL (2005, 2006); MAC tournament (2009); MAC West Division (2009)

Kelly Packard is a retired women's basketball coach at Taylor University. Previously she served as head women's basketball coach at Ball State University. She served in that position for four seasons (2008–12) and moved into the position at Taylor in 2013. She is a former head coach of the Colorado Chill from the National Women's Basketball League. She previously served as an assistant coach at Colorado State University, where she helped the Rams to a 99-49 record. In 2004 and 2005, the Colorado Chill won the NWBL Championships.

She was a four year basketball player at Anderson University (Indiana), and is a member of the Anderson University Hall of Fame. Her 1990 records— scoring (1,275) and rebounds (723) stood until 2001, when they were broken by Rachel Miller.

In 2009, she coached the Cardinals to a 26–9 record, the best record in school history, including an NCAA Tournament first-round upset of national power the University of Tennessee and head coach Pat Summitt. It was the first time in history that Summitt had been defeated in the first round. The Women's Basketball Coaches Association selected Packard to receive the Maggie Dixon Rookie Coach of the Year award for Division I coaches.

In 2018 May 29 Packard hired for assistant coach to Northern Colorado, but she resigned and retiring from coaching one week later, due to her chronic health issues.
