= 1992 NAIA Division I women's basketball tournament =

- Teams: 32
- Finals site: Oman Arena, Jackson, Tennessee
- Champions: Arkansas Tech Golden Suns (1st title, 1st title game, 2nd Fab Four)
- Runner-up: Wayland Baptist Pioneers (2nd title game, 3rd Fab Four)
- Semifinalists: St. Edward's Hilltoppers (1st Fab Four); SW Oklahoma State Bulldogs (7th Fab Four)
- Coach of the year: Joe Foley (Arkansas Tech)
- Charles Stevenson Hustle Award: Carin Pinion (Arkansas Tech)
- Chuck Taylor MVP: Dawn Grell (Arkansas Tech)
- Top scorer: Dawn Grell (Arkansas Tech) (126 points)

The 1992 NAIA Division I women's basketball tournament was the 12th annual tournament held by the NAIA to determine the national champion of women's college basketball among its members in the United States and Canada and the first held exclusively for the programs in its newly established Division I.

A separate tournament was held concurrently by the NAIA for the teams sorted into Division II.

Arkansas Tech defeated Wayland Baptist in the championship game, 84–68, to claim the Golden Suns' first NAIA national title.

The tournament was played at the Oman Arena in Jackson, Tennessee.

== Qualification ==
The tournament field expanded for the second time in its history, increasing from sixteen to thirty-two teams. The top sixteen teams received seeds.

The tournament continue to utilize a simple single-elimination format.

== Bracket ==
First round
1	Simon Fraser	96
Pembroke State	45
Kennesaw State	94
16	Rosary (IL)	90
9	Midland Lutheran	61
Louisiana College	65
Emporia State	53
8	St. Edward's	73
5	Southern Nazarene	61
Carson-Newman	49
Central State (OH)	70
12	Union (TN)	77
13	Montevallo	58
NW Oklahoma State	78
Christ–Irvine	58
4	Wayland Baptist	78
3	SW Oklahoma State	72
New Mexico Highlands	38
Campbellsville	72
14	Doane	79
11	Auburn Montgomery	62
Fresno Pacific	65
Wingate	64
6	Claflin	69
7	St. Ambrose	68
William Woods	52
Minnesota Duluth	65
10	Belmont	67
15	Berry	67
Charleston (WV)	61
St. Vincent	48
2	Arkansas Tech	86

Second round
1	Simon Fraser	77
Kennesaw State	40
Louisiana College	68
8	St. Edward's	74
5	Southern Nazarene	86
12	Union (TN)	87
NW Oklahoma State	53
4	Wayland Baptist	61
3	SW Oklahoma State	83
14	Doane	55
Fresno Pacific	67
6	Claflin	77
7	St. Ambrose	62
10	Belmont	78
15	Berry	57
2	Arkansas Tech	80

Quarterfinals
1	Simon Fraser	72
8	St. Edward's	77
12	Union (TN)	73
4	Wayland Baptist	87
3	SW Oklahoma State	51
6	Claflin	36
10	Belmont	65
2	Arkansas Tech	88

Semifinals
8	St. Edward's	61
4	Wayland Baptist	84
3	SW Oklahoma State	44
2	Arkansas Tech	64

National championship
4	Wayland Baptist	68
2	Arkansas Tech	84

== See also ==
- 1992 NAIA Division I men's basketball tournament
- 1992 NCAA Division I women's basketball tournament
- 1992 NCAA Division II women's basketball tournament
- 1992 NCAA Division III women's basketball tournament
- 1992 NAIA Division II women's basketball tournament
