= Gianluca Marchetti =

Italian basketball player

Basket Barcellona
- Position: Point guard
- League: Serie A2 Gold Basket

Personal information
- Born: June 18, 1993 (age 33) Bracciano, Italy
- Listed height: 5 ft 9 in (1.75 m)
- Listed weight: 154 lb (70 kg)

Career information
- Playing career: 2010–present

Career history
- 2010–2013: Virtus Roma
- 2013: → Don Bosco Livorno (loan)
- 2013–2014: Vanoli Cremona
- 2014–: Basket Barcellona

Gianluca Marchetti (born June 18, 1993) is an Italian professional basketball player who currently plays the point guard position for Basket Barcellona of the A2 Gold Basket Series.

== Career ==
Marchetti grew up in the Virtus Roma young team. He made his Serie A debut with Roma in 2010. He played in Rome since 2012, then he was loaned to Don Bosco Livorno.

On August 31, 2013, he signed a one-year contract with Vanoli Cremona so he returns to play in Serie A.

In the summer, he moved to Basket Barcellona of the A2 Gold Basket Series, the second-tier division of professional club basketball in Italy.
