= 1992 NCAA Division III women's basketball tournament =

- Teams: 32
- Finals site: , Bethlehem, Pennsylvania
- Champions: Alma Scots (1st title)
- Runner-up: Moravian Greyhounds (1st title game)
- Third place: Luther Norse (1st Final Four)
- Fourth place: Eastern Connecticut State Warriors (2nd Final Four)
- Winning coach: Charlie Goffnet (1st title)

The 1992 NCAA Division III women's basketball tournament was the 11th annual tournament hosted by the NCAA to determine the national champion of Division III women's collegiate basketball in the United States.

Alma defeated Moravian in the championship game, 79–75, to claim the Scots' first Division III national title.

The championship rounds were hosted by Moravian College in Bethlehem, Pennsylvania.

== Bracket ==
- An asterisk by a team indicates the host of first and second round games
- An asterisk by a score indicates an overtime period

=== East sectional ===
Regionals; March 6–7, 1992; Campus sites
Eastern Connecticut*	81
Emmanuel (MA)	72
East Regional
Southern Maine*	73
Clark (MA)	61
(Pairings are reseeded after the first round)
Albany*	65
William Smith	42
Northeast Regional
Cortland State*	65
St. John Fisher	51

Sectional semifinals March 13, 1992; Albany, NY
Eastern Connecticut	69
Albany	57
Southern Maine	50
Cortland State	49

Sectional finals March 14, 1992; Albany, NY
Eastern Connecticut	63
Southern Maine	56

=== Mid-Atlantic sectional ===
Regionals; March 6–7, 1992; Campus sites
Capital*	106
Glassboro State	51
Atlantic Regional
Ohio Wesleyan*	68
Muskingum	81
(Pairings are reseeded after the first round)
Susquehanna*	66
Scranton	67*
Mid-Atlantic Regional
Moravian*	84
Western Connecticut	53

Sectional semifinals March 13, 1992; Bethlehem, PA
Capital	80
Scranton	56
Muskingum	90
Moravian	104

Sectional finals March 14, 1992; Bethlehem, PA
Capital	76
Moravian	85

=== Great Lakes sectional ===
Regionals; March 6–7, 1992; Campus sites
Maryville (TN)*	71
Roanoke	73
South Regional
Marymount (VA)	71
Christopher Newport*	73
(Pairings are reseeded after the first round)
Alma	92
Adrian*	77
Great Lakes Regional
Wisconsin–Eau Claire*	83*
Wisconsin–Oshkosh	81

Sectional semifinals March 13, 1992; Eau Claire, WI
Roanoke	60
Alma	69
Christopher Newport	74
Wisconsin–Eau Claire	90

Sectional finals March 14, 1992; Eau Claire, WI
Alma	83
Wisconsin–Eau Claire	73

=== Central sectional ===
Regionals; March 6–7, 1992; Campus sites
St. Thomas (MN)*	89
St. Olaf	60
West Regional
Saint Benedict*	86
Concordia Moorhead	76
(Pairings are reseeded after the first round)
Washington St. Louis*	79
Luther	101
Central Regional
Wartburg*	90
Wisconsin–Stout	72

Sectional semifinals March 13, 1992; Waverly, IA
St. Thomas (MN)	60
Luther	61
St. Benedict	64
Wartburg	74

Sectional finals March 14, 1992; Waverly, IA
Luther	70
Wartburg	61

=== Final Four ===
Final Four
Eastern Connecticut State	67
Moravian	74
Alma	81
Luther	80

National championship
Moravian	75
Alma	79
Third place
Eastern Connecticut State	74
Luther	79

== All-tournament team ==
- Lauri LaBeau, Alma
- Kathy Beck, Moravian
- Pam Porter, Moravian
- Trish Harvey, Luther
- Wendy Rogers, Eastern Connecticut State

== See also ==
- 1992 NCAA Division III men's basketball tournament
- 1992 NCAA Division I women's basketball tournament
- 1992 NCAA Division II women's basketball tournament
- 1992 NAIA Division I women's basketball tournament
- 1992 NAIA Division II women's basketball tournament
