= Douglas Legg =

British basketball player

Personal information
- Nationality: British
- Born: 30 October 1914; Birmingham, England
- Died: 30 October 1989 (aged 75); Malvern, England

Sport
- Sport: Basketball

Douglas Legg (30 October 1914 – 30 October 1989) was a British basketball player. He competed in the men's tournament at the 1948 Summer Olympics.
