= PZU Polfa Pabianice =

PZU Polfa Pabianice was a Polish women's basketball team based in Pabianice that played in the Sharp Torell Basket Liga.

== 2003/04 season ==
PZU Polfa Pabianice has won the 3rd place in the Polish Championship 2004 by winning the playoffs 2:1 against CCC Aquapark Polkowice.
