= 1992 NAIA Division II men's basketball tournament =

- Teams: 20
- Finals site: Wisdom Gymnasium; Stephenville, Texas
- Champions: Grace Lancers (1st title, 1st title game)
- Runner-up: Northwestern Red Raiders (1st title game)
- Semifinalists: Concordia Bulldogs; Dakota State Trojans
- Charles Stevenson Hustle Award: Earnest Monette (Dakota State)
- Chuck Taylor MVP: David James (Grace)
- Top scorer: Craig Douma (Northwestern (IA)) (84 points)

The 1992 NAIA Division II men's basketball tournament was the tournament held by the NAIA to determine the national champion of men's college basketball among its Division II members in the United States and Canada for the 1991–92 basketball season.

This was the first tournament held exclusively for Division II teams; a separate tournament was held concurrently for the teams the NAIA sorted into its Division I.

Grace defeated Northwestern (IA) in the championship game, 85–79 in overtime, to claim the Lancers' first NAIA national title.

The tournament was played at the Wisdom Gymnasium at Tarleton State University in Stephenville, Texas.

== Qualification ==
The tournament field for the inaugural Division II championship was set at 20 teams, a decrease of 12 teams from the last single-division NAIA tournament in 1991. The top eight teams received seeds, while the eight lowest ranked teams were placed in a preliminary first round.

The tournament utilized a single-elimination format.

== Bracket ==
First round
Dakota State	86
Edgewood	70
George Fox	90
Missouri Valley	70
Husson	82
Philadelphia Pharmacy	68
Florida Memorial	62
The King's (NY)	59

Second round
1	King (TN)	79
Dakota State	92
William Jewell	79
8	St. Joseph's (ME)	66
5	Tarleton State	59
Northwestern (IA)	71
George Fox	85
4	Eureka	77
3	Franklin	85
Husson	82
Tiffin	69
6	Grace	81
7	Northwest Nazarene	63
Concordia (NE)	75
Florida Memorial	83
2	MidAmerica Nazarene	97

Quarterfinals
Dakota State	83
William Jewell	77
Northwestern (IA)	85
George Fox	82
3	Franklin	70
6	Grace	106
Concordia (NE)	102
MidAmerica Nazarene	90

Semifinals
Dakota State	68
Northwestern (IA)	91
6	Grace	95
Concordia (NE)	89

National championship
Northwestern (IA)	79
6	Grace	85*

== See also ==
- 1992 NAIA Division I men's basketball tournament
- 1992 NCAA Division I men's basketball tournament
- 1992 NCAA Division II men's basketball tournament
- 1992 NCAA Division III men's basketball tournament
- 1992 NAIA Division II women's basketball tournament
