= 1992 NAIA Division I men's basketball tournament =

College basketball tournament

- Teams: 32
- Finals site: Kemper Arena; Kansas City, Missouri
- Champions: Oklahoma City (2 title, 2 title game, 2 Fab Four)
- Runner-up: Central Arkansas (2 title game, 2 Fab Four)
- Semifinalists: BYU Hawaii (1 Final Four); Pfeiffer (1 Final Four)
- Charles Stevenson Hustle Award: Tony Smith (Pfeiffer)
- Chuck Taylor MVP: Smokey McCovery (Oklahoma City)

The 1992 NAIA Men's Division I Basketball Tournament was held in March at Kemper Arena in Kansas City, Missouri. The 55th annual NAIA basketball tournament featured 32 teams playing in a single-elimination format. The 1991 finalists were again competing for the title in the 1992 tournament's last game. Oklahoma City again won against Central Arkansas (82–73).

== Awards and honors ==
- Leading scorers:
- Leading rebounder:
- Player of the Year: est. 1994.

== 1992 NAIA bracket ==
First round	Second round
1	Oklahoma City	107
–	Columbia Union	73
1	Oklahoma City	96
16	Urbana	89
16	Urbana	92
–	St. Mary’s (MI)	90
TOP TIER
–	Cumberland (KY)	51
9	Taylor	48
–	Cumberland (KY)	76
–	Olivet Nazarene	62
–	Olivet Nazarene	82
8	Wayland Baptist	65
5	Pfeiffer	104
–	Berry	64
5	Pfeiffer	59
-	Minnesota Duluth	53
–	Minnesota–Duluth	66
12	Faulkner	57
TOP TIER
13	NW Oklahoma State	60
–	Wisconsin–Eau Claire	58
13	NW Oklahoma State	51
4	Biola	64
4	Biola	71
–	Union (TN)	70
3	Georgetown (KY)	97
–	Lewis–Clark State	74
3	Georgetown (KY)	72
14	Birmingham Southern	71
14	Birmingham–Southern	98
–	Malone	96
BOTTOM TIER
11	Lipscomb	67
–	Findlay	66
11	Lipscomb	66
6	BYU–Hawaii	90
6	BYU–Hawaii	78
–	Emporia State	75
7	Central Arkansas	77
–	Charleston (WV)	70
7	Central Arkansas	87
–	Spring Hill	83
–	Spring Hill	90
10	Briar Cliff	66
BOTTOM TIER
15	Erskine	101
–	McKendree	90
15	Erskine	66
2	Wisconsin–Stevens Point	64
2	Wisconsin–Stevens Point	58
–	Western State (CO)	54

Elite Eight
1	Oklahoma City	97
–	Cumberland (KY)	63
5	Pfeiffer	99
4	Biola	83
3	Georgetown (KY)	70
6	BYU–Hawaii	72
7	Central Arkansas	74
15	Erskine	62

NAIA national semifinals
1	Oklahoma City	102
5	Pfeiffer	92
6	BYU–Hawaii	65
7	Central Arkansas	72

NAIA national championship
1	Oklahoma City	82
7	Central Arkansas	73

- * denotes overtime.

== See also ==
- 1992 NAIA Division I women's basketball tournament
- 1992 NCAA Division I men's basketball tournament
- 1992 NCAA Division II men's basketball tournament
- 1992 NCAA Division III men's basketball tournament
- 1992 NAIA Division II men's basketball tournament
