= 1992 NCAA Division II men's basketball tournament =

- Teams: 32
- Finals site: Springfield Civic Center, Springfield, Massachusetts
- Champions: Virginia Union Panthers (2nd title)
- Runner-up: Bridgeport Knights (2nd title game)
- Semifinalists: Bakersfield State Roadrunners (5th Final Four); California (PA) Vulcans (1st Final Four)
- Winning coach: Dave Robbins (2nd title)
- MOP: Derrick Johnson (Virginia Union)
- Attendance: 41,219

The 1992 NCAA Division II men's basketball tournament involved 32 schools playing in a single-elimination tournament to determine the national champion of men's NCAA Division II college basketball as a culmination of the 1991-92 NCAA Division II men's basketball season. It was won by Virginia Union University and Virginia Union's Derrick Johnson was the Most Outstanding Player.

1992 NCAA Division II Men's sites - regionals (cyan) Elite Eight (red)

== Regional participants ==
School	Outcome
Assumption	Fourth Place
Bridgeport	Regional Champion
Merrimack	Third Place
New Hampshire College	Runner-up

School	Outcome
Central Oklahoma	Regional Champion
Missouri Western State	Fourth Place
Texas A&M-Kingsville	Third Place
Washburn	Runner-up

School	Outcome
Denver	Runner-up
North Dakota	Third Place
St. Cloud State	Fourth Place
South Dakota State	Regional Champion

School	Outcome
California (PA)	Regional Champion
Pace	Fourth Place
Philadelphia U	Runner-up
St. Rose	Third Place

School	Outcome
Jacksonville State	Regional Champion
Rollins	Fourth Place
USC Spartanburg	Runner-up
Troy State	Third Place

School	Outcome
Cal State Bakersfield	Regional Champions
Chico State	Fourth Place
Grand Canyon	Third Place
UC Riverside	Runner-up

School	Outcome
Grand Valley State	Fourth Place
Kentucky Wesleyan	Regional Champion
St. Joseph's (IN)	Third Place
Wayne State (MI)	Runner-up

School	Outcome
Albany State	Third Place
Johnson C. Smith	Runner-up
Norfolk State	Fourth Place
Virginia Union	Regional Champion

*denotes tie

== Regionals ==
=== New England - Manchester, New Hampshire ===
Location: NHC Fieldhouse Host: New Hampshire College

Regional semifinals Round of 32; March 13
New Hampshire College	89
Assumption	87
Bridgeport	91
Merrimack	84

Regional final Sweet 16; March 14
New Hampshire College	87
Bridgeport	100

- Third Place - Merrimack 105, Assumption 84

=== South Central - Topeka, Kansas ===
Location: Lee Arena Host: Washburn University

Regional semifinals Round of 32; March 13
Central Oklahoma	100*
Missouri Western State	96
Washburn	85
Texas A&M–Kingsville	65

Regional final Sweet 16; March 14
Central Oklahoma	132
Washburn	114

- Third Place - Texas A&M–Kingsville 97, Missouri Western State 83

=== North Central - Brookings, South Dakota ===
Location: Frost Arena Host: South Dakota State University

Regional semifinals Round of 32; March 13
Denver	73
North Dakota	68
South Dakota State	79*
St. Cloud State	74

Regional final Sweet 16; March 14
Denver	57
South Dakota State	87

- Third Place - North Dakota 80, St. Cloud State 60

=== East - California, Pennsylvania ===
Location: Hamer Hall Host: California University of Pennsylvania

Regional semifinals Round of 32; March 13
Philadelphia U	83
St. Rose	70
California (PA)	69*
Pace	66

Regional final Sweet 16; March 14
Philadelphia U	79
California (PA)	90

- Third Place - St. Rose 59, Pace 52

=== South Atlantic - Jacksonville, Alabama ===
Location: Pete Mathews Coliseum Host: Jacksonville State University

Regional semifinals Round of 32; March 13
USC Spartanburg	87
Rollins	83
Jacksonville State	96
Troy	91

Regional final Sweet 16; March 14
USC Spartanburg	87
Jacksonville State	105

- Third Place - Troy 110, Rollins 92

=== West - Bakersfield, California ===
Location: CSUB Student Activities Center Host: California State University, Bakersfield

Regional semifinals Round of 32; March 13
UC Riverside	74
Grand Canyon	61
Cal State Bakersfield	99
Chico State	78

Regional final Sweet 16; March 14
UC Riverside	70
Cal State Bakersfield	72*

- Third Place - Grand Canyon 88, Chico State 87

=== Great Lakes - Owensboro, Kentucky ===
Location: Owensboro Sportscenter Host: Kentucky Wesleyan College

Regional semifinals Round of 32; March 13
Wayne State (MI)	63
St. Joseph's (IN)	56
Kentucky Wesleyan	84
Grand Valley State	73

Regional final Sweet 16; March 14
Wayne State (MI)	72
Kentucky Wesleyan	90

- Third Place - St. Joseph's (IN) 74, Grand Valley State 64*

=== South - Fayetteville, North Carolina ===
Location: Felton J. Capel Arena Hosts: Fayetteville State University and Virginia Union University

Regional semifinals Round of 32; March 13
Johnson C. Smith	82
Norfolk State	76
Virginia Union	79
Albany State	67

Regional final Sweet 16; March 14
Johnson C. Smith	70
Virginia Union	87

- Third Place - Albany State 73, Norfolk State 70

*denotes each overtime played

== Elite Eight - Springfield, Massachusetts ==
Location: Springfield Civic Center Hosts: American International College and Springfield College

National Quarterfinals; Elite Eight; March 26
Bridgeport	127*
Central Oklahoma	124
South Dakota State	73
California (PA)	84
Jacksonville State	59
Cal State Bakersfield	89
Kentucky Wesleyan	69
Virginia Union	81

National semifinals Final Four; March 27
Bridgeport	76
California (PA)	75
Cal State Bakersfield	66
Virginia Union	69

National championship March 28
Bridgeport	75
Virginia Union	100

*denotes each overtime played

== All-tournament team ==
- Derrick Johnson (Virginia Union)
- Reggie Jones (Virginia Union)
- Winston Jones (Bridgeport)
- Kenney Toomer (California (PA))
- Steve Wills (Bridgeport)

== See also ==
- 1992 NCAA Division I men's basketball tournament
- 1992 NCAA Division III men's basketball tournament
- 1992 NAIA Division I men's basketball tournament
- 1992 NAIA Division II men's basketball tournament
- 1992 NCAA Division II women's basketball tournament
