= Arvika Basket =

Swedish basketball club

- Founded: 1976
- Arena: Arvika sporthall
- Location: Arvika, Sweden

Arvika Basket is a Swedish basketball club from Arvika founded in 1976. It is best known for its women's team, which won six national championships in a row between 1989 and 1994 and reached the final of the 1991 European Cup, lost to Athena Cesena. It currently plays in the second tier.

== Titles ==
- Damligan
  - 1989, 1990, 1991, 1992, 1993, 1994
