= 1992 NCAA Division III men's basketball tournament =

American collegiate men's basketball tournament (1992)

- Finals site: , Springfield, Ohio
- Champions: Calvin Knights (1st title)
- Runner-up: Rochester Yellowjackets (2nd title game)
- Semifinalists: Wisconsin–Platteville Pioneers (2nd Final Four); Jersey City State Gothic Knights (1st Final Four)
- Winning coach: Ed Douma (Calvin)
- MOP: Steve Honderd (Calvin)
- Attendance: 45,611

The 1992 NCAA Division III men's basketball tournament was the 18th annual single-elimination tournament to determine the national champions of National Collegiate Athletic Association (NCAA) men's Division III collegiate basketball in the United States.

The field featured forty teams, with the championship rounds again contested in Springfield, Ohio.

Calvin defeated Rochester, 62–49, to clinch their first NCAA Division III national title. The Knights (31–1) were coached by Ed Douma.

Wisconsin–Platteville, the defending champions, finished in third place.

== Bracket ==
=== Top left sectional ===
First round
King's (PA)	74
Susquehanna	71
Albany	72
NYU	66

Second round
Franklin & Marshall	74
King's (PA)	62
Buffalo State	73
St. John Fisher	56
Johns Hopkins	49
Scranton	58
Albany	49
Rochester	75

Sectional semifinals
Franklin & Marshall	64
Buffalo State	55
Scranton	54
Rochester	69

Sectional finals
Franklin & Marshall	68
Rochester	77

=== Bottom left sectional ===
First round
Ripon	83
Wisconsin–Whitewater	86
DePauw	49
Elmhurst	56
Emory & Henry	77
Ferrum	79

Second round
Wisconsin–Platteville	90
Wisconsin–Whitewater	78
Centre (KY)	83
Hampden-Sydney	88
Illinois Wesleyan	95
Elmhurst	70
Ferrum	92
Maryville (TN)	94

Sectional semifinals
Wisconsin–Platteville	89
Hampden-Sydney	71
Illinois Wesleyan	71
Maryville (TN)	73

Sectional finals
Wisconsin–Platteville	87*
Maryville (TN)	83

=== Top right sectional ===
First round
Kean	63
Stockton State	60

Second round
Babson	67
Eastern Connecticut	69
Hunter	68
Jersey City State	81
Salem State	89
Western Connecticut	77
Kean	99
Salisbury State	107*

Sectional semifinals
Eastern Connecticut	86
Jersey City State	92
Salem State	85
Salisbury State	95

Sectional finals
Jersey City State	97
Salisbury State	83

=== Bottom right sectional ===
First round
Hope	76
Wittenberg	60
Colorado College	87
Simpson	67

Second round
Calvin	91
Hope	88
Colorado College	73
Gustavus Adolphus	77*
Otterbein	80
Wooster	77
Cal Lutheran	88
UC San Diego	70

Sectional semifinals
Calvin	69
Gustavus Adolphus	68
Otterbein	82
Cal Lutheran	78

Sectional finals
Calvin	88
Otterbein	67

=== National finals ===
- Site: Springfield, Ohio

National Semifinals
Rochester	61
UW–Platteville	48
Jersey City State	40
Calvin	81

National Championship
Rochester	49
Calvin	62
National Third-place
UW–Platteville	72
Jersey City State	61

== All-tournament team ==
- Steve Honderd, Calvin
- Matt Harrison, Calvin
- Mike LeFebre, Calvin
- Chris Fite, Rochester
- Kyle Meeker, Rochester

== See also ==
- 1992 NCAA Division III women's basketball tournament
- 1992 NCAA Division I men's basketball tournament
- 1992 NCAA Division II men's basketball tournament
- 1992 NAIA Division I men's basketball tournament
- 1992 NAIA Division II men's basketball tournament
