= USBWA National Freshman of the Year =

US college basketball award

- Awarded for: the most outstanding freshman male and female college basketball players
- Country: United States
- Presented by: United States Basketball Writers Association (USBWA)

History
- First award: 1989 (men); 1992 (women)
- Most recent: Cameron Boozer, Duke (men); Jazzy Davidson, USC (women)
- Website: Official website

The USBWA National Freshman of the Year is an annual basketball honor given to college basketball's most outstanding freshman male player and female player by the United States Basketball Writers Association (USBWA), an association of college basketball journalists. Since 2011 the men's award has been called the Wayman Tisdale Award while the women's award has been called the Tamika Catchings Award since 2020. The award was first given following the 1988–89 season for men and 1991–92 for women.

There has never been a tie for the men's award, but there have been two for the women, with Tasha Humphrey (Georgia) and Candice Wiggins (Stanford) sharing the 2004–05 award, and Paige Bueckers (UConn) and Caitlin Clark (Iowa) sharing honors in 2020–21. Five players have been named a national player of the year by receiving one of the major awards for either men or women^{[a]} in the same season as being named the USBWA Freshman of the Year. Among men's players, Kevin Durant (Texas) was the first in 2007, followed by Anthony Davis (Kentucky) in 2012, Zion Williamson (Duke) in 2019, and Cooper Flagg (also of Duke) in 2025. The first woman to receive both honors was Bueckers in 2021.

On July 26, 2010, the USBWA announced that they would rename the men's National Freshman of the Year award after the late Wayman Tisdale, who in 1983 was named a first-team All-American as a freshman at Oklahoma. The women's award was officially named in honor of Tamika Catchings on October 17, 2019. As a freshman at Tennessee in 1997–98, she averaged 18.2 points for the undefeated national champion Lady Volunteers. Catchings went on to be named a three-time USBWA All-American and the organization's national player of the year in 2000.

== Key ==
†	Co-National Freshman of the Year
*	Awarded a national player of the year award that same season: Men – Sporting News; Oscar Robertson Trophy; Associated Press; NABC; UPI; Naismith; Wooden; Adolph Rupp Trophy; Helms; Women – Associated Press; Naismith; Wooden; WBCA

== Winners ==
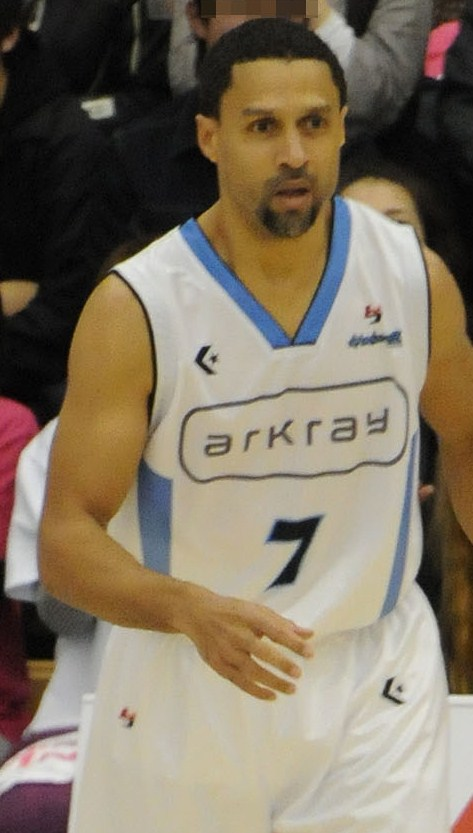
Chris Jackson^{[b]}, LSU, 1989

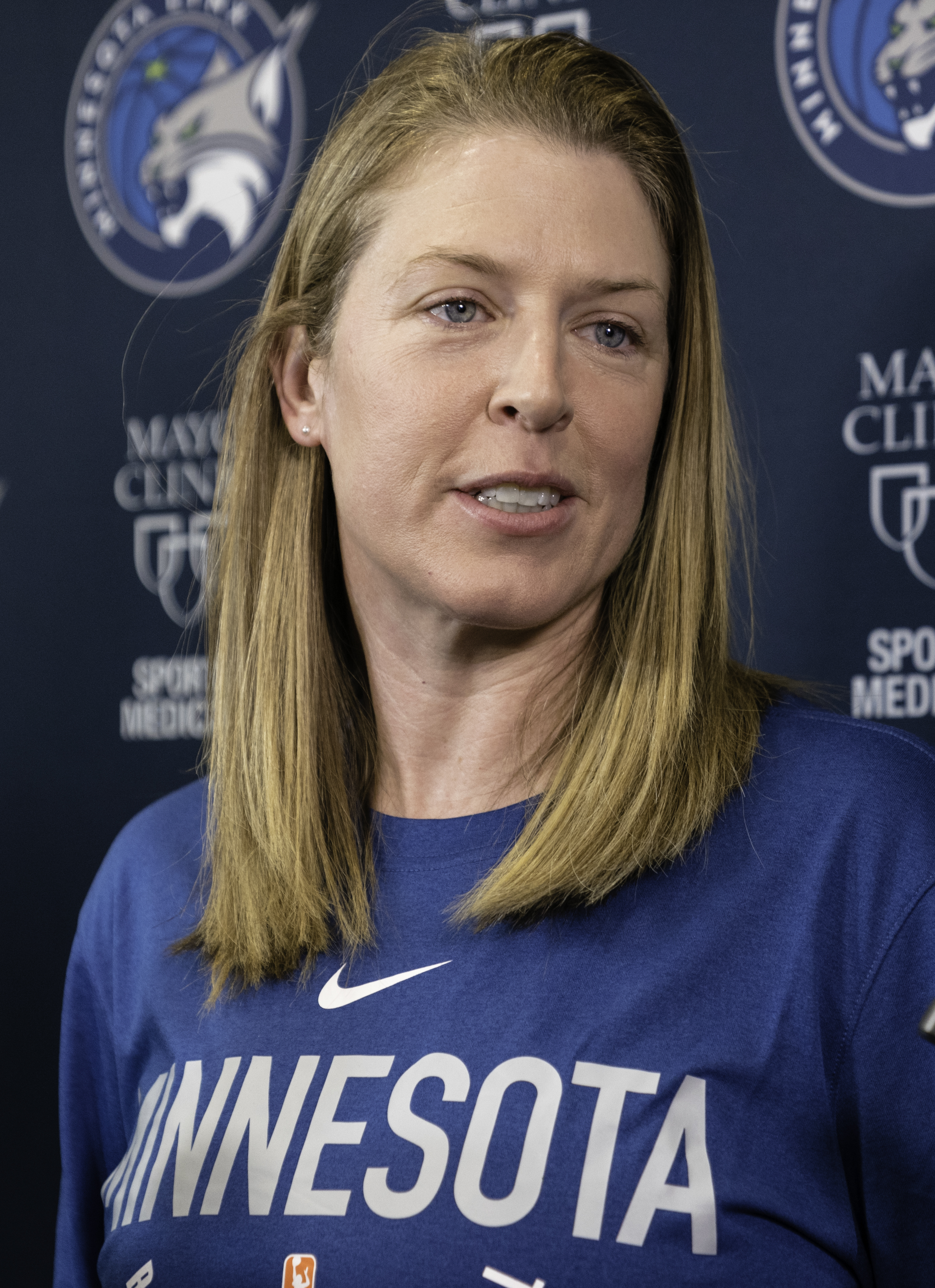
Katie Smith, Ohio State, 1993

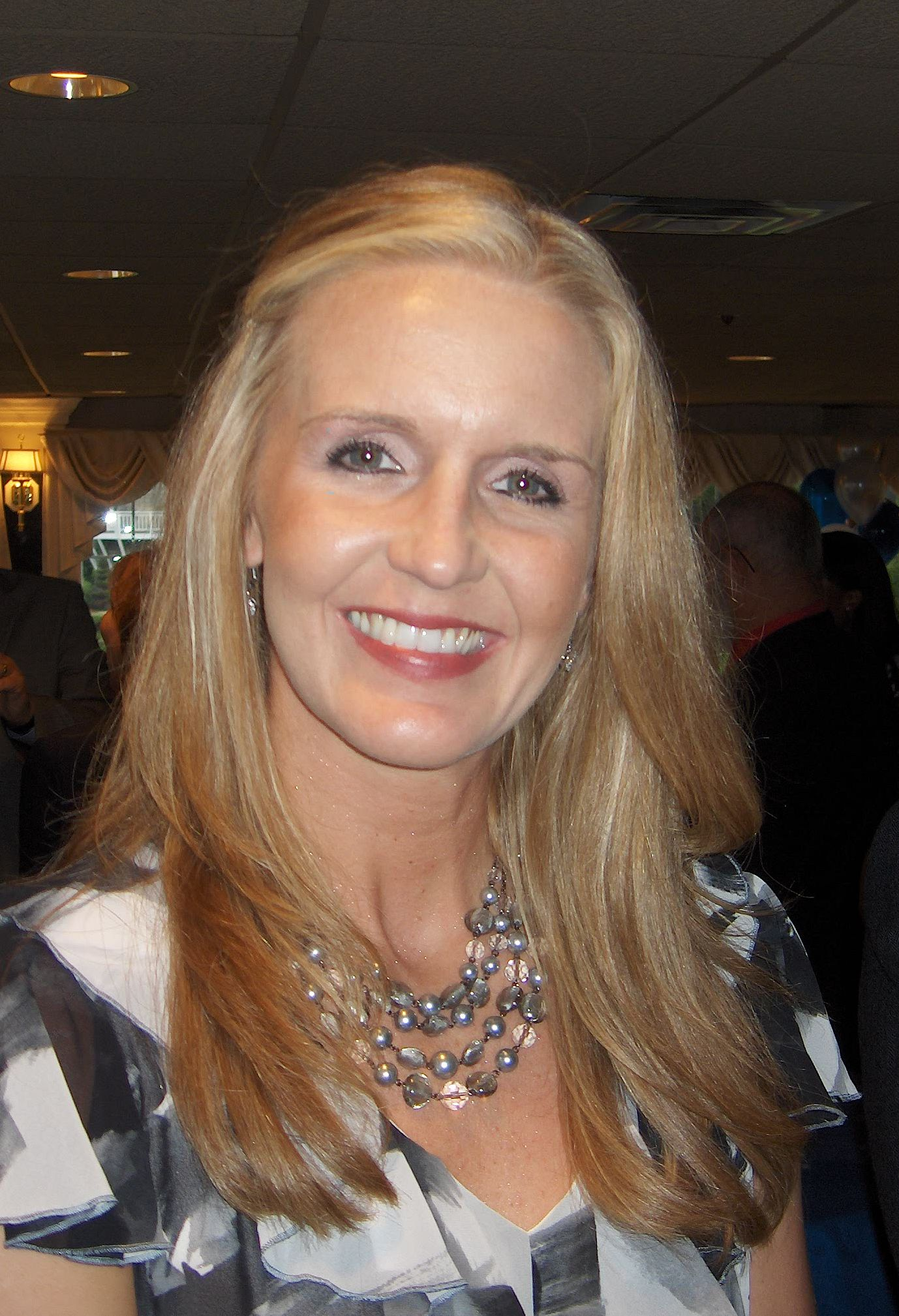
Shea Ralph, UConn, 1997

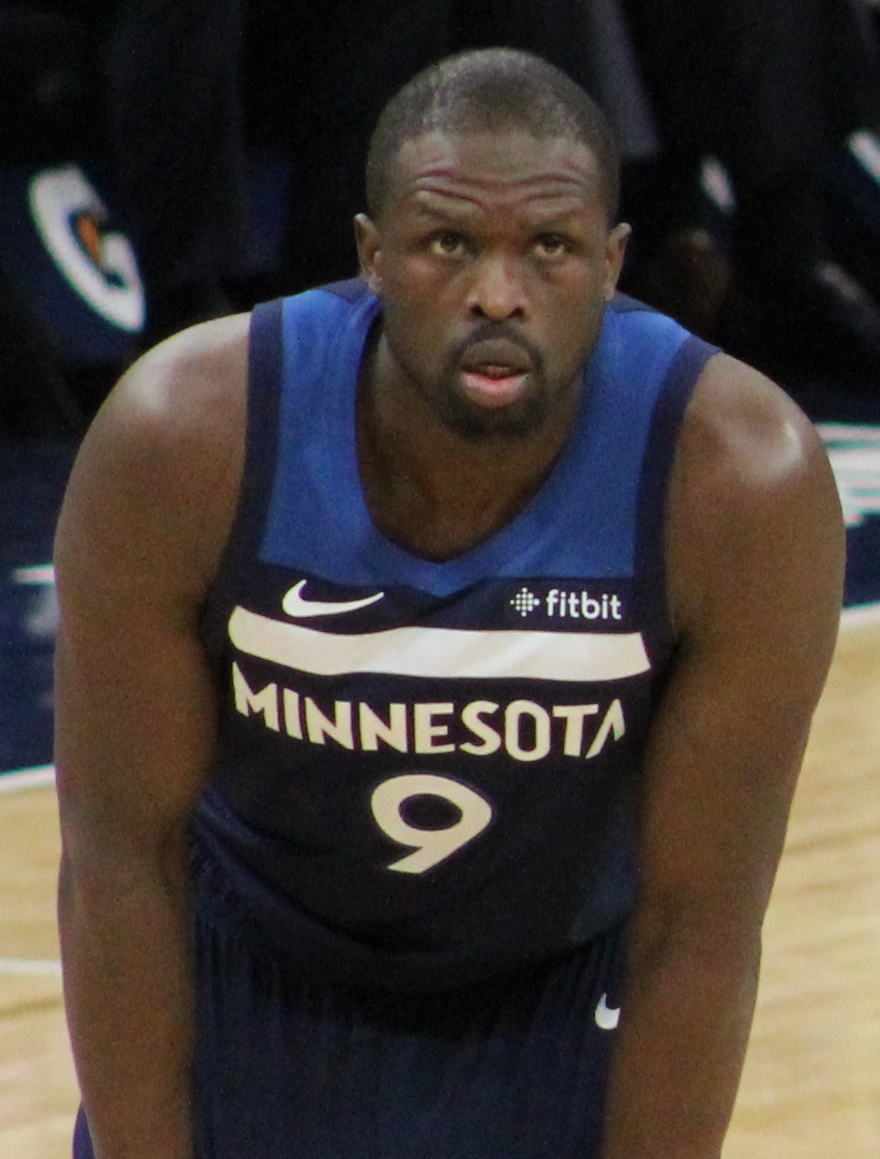
Luol Deng, Duke, 2004

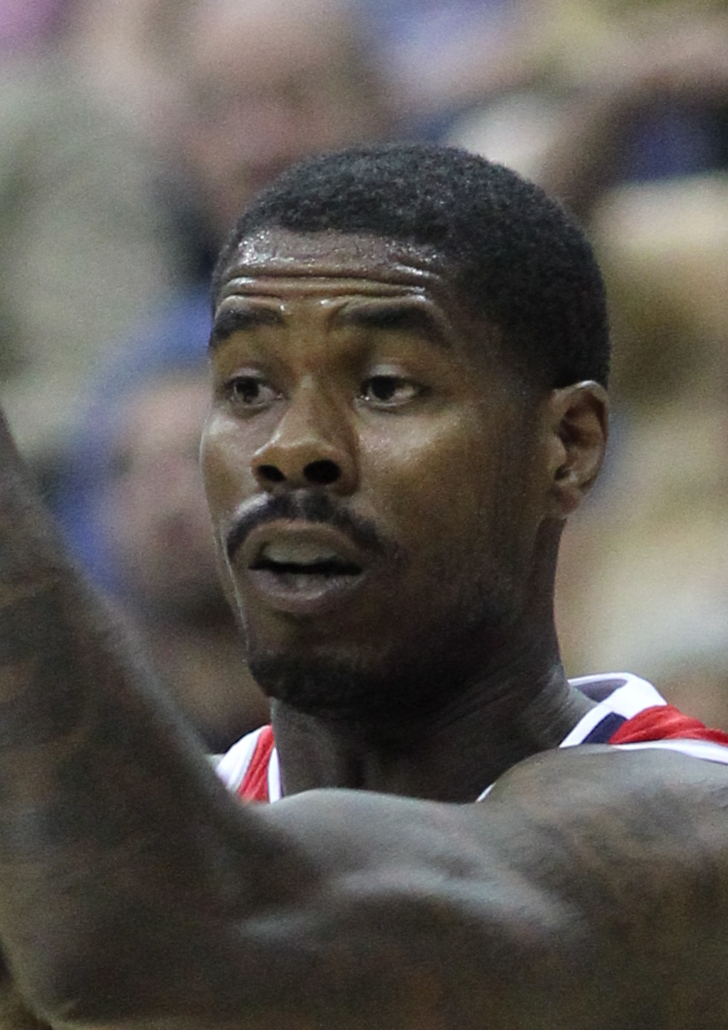
Marvin Williams, North Carolina, 2005

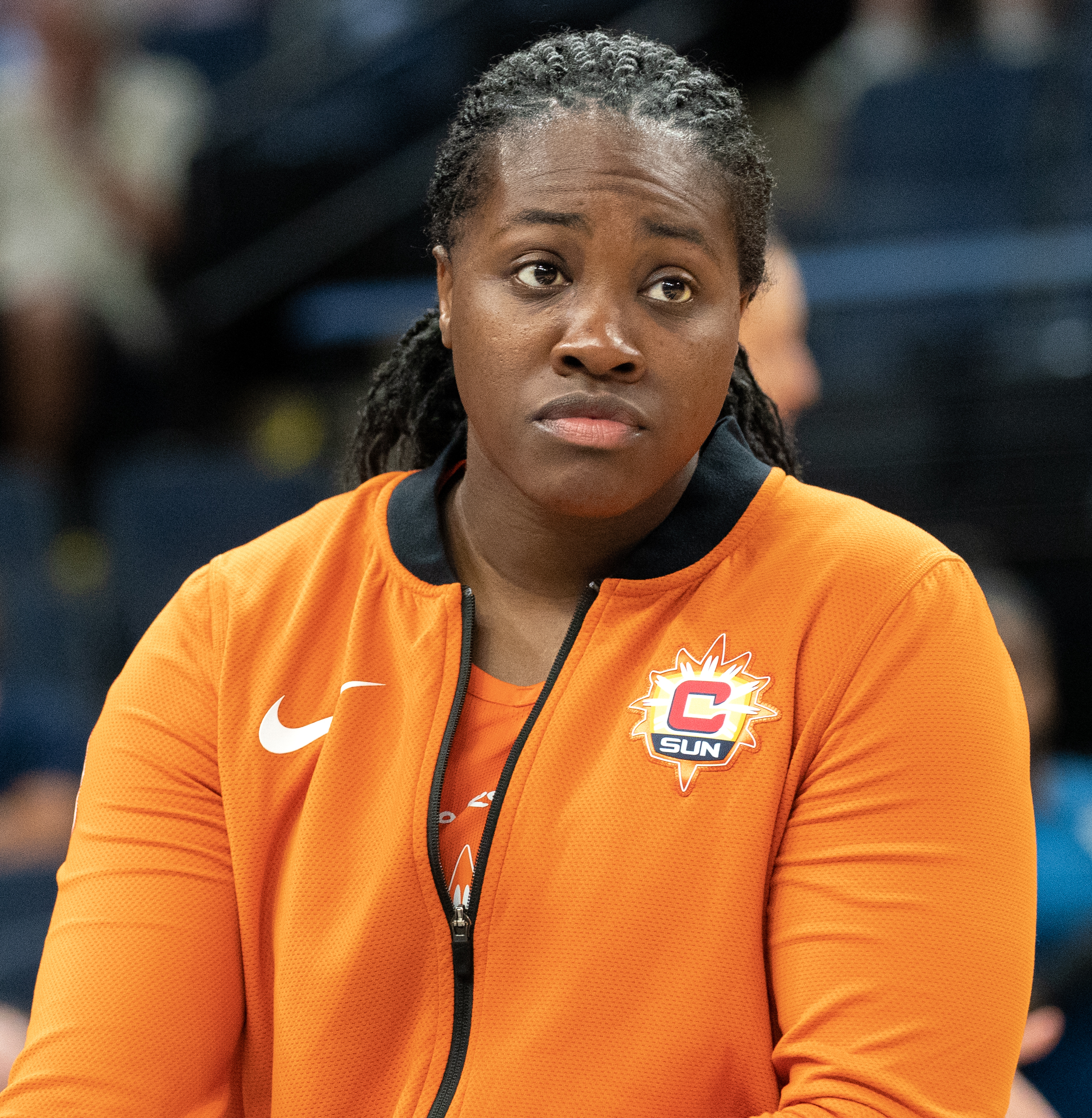
Shekinna Stricklen, Tennessee, 2009

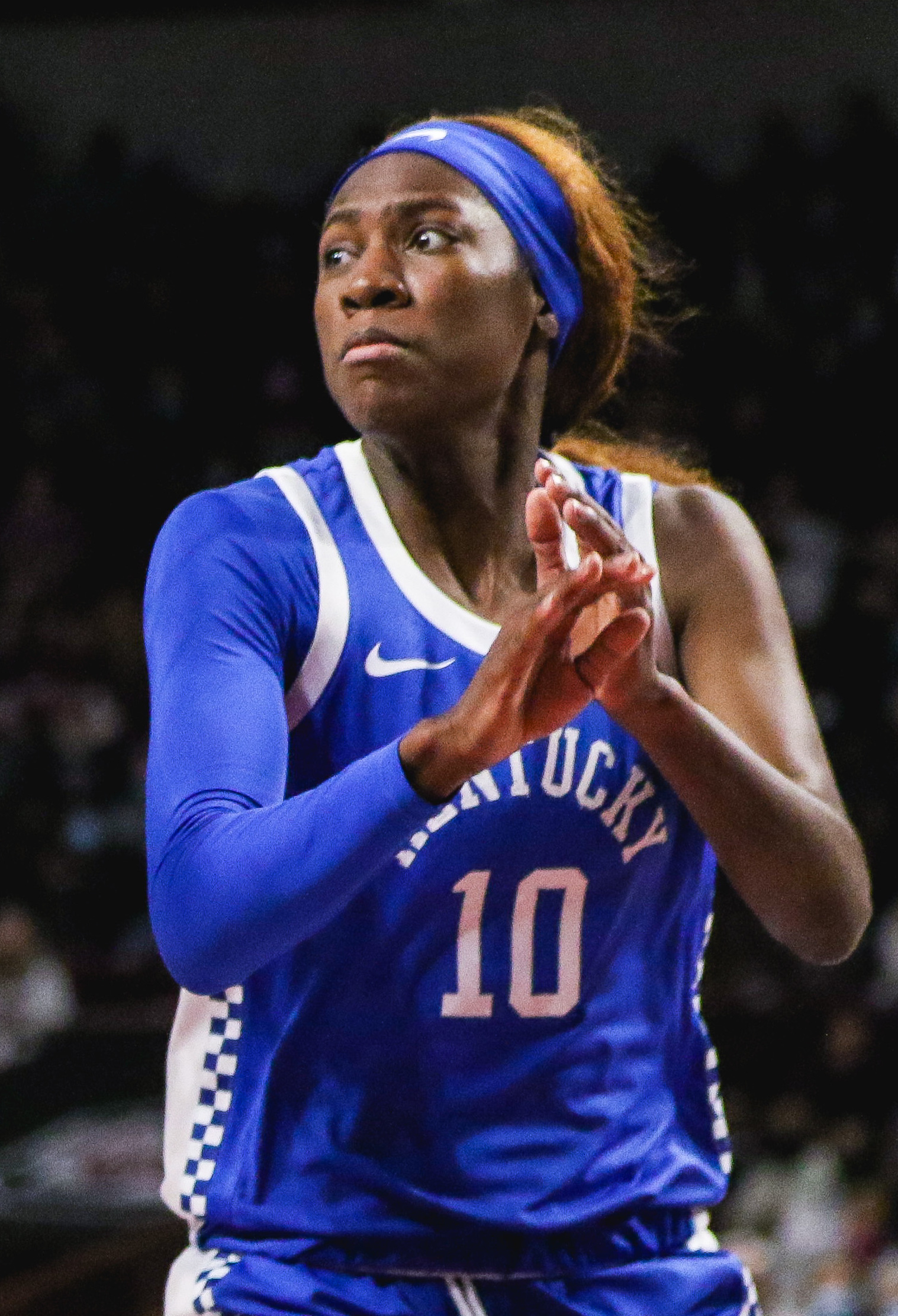
Rhyne Howard, Kentucky, 2019

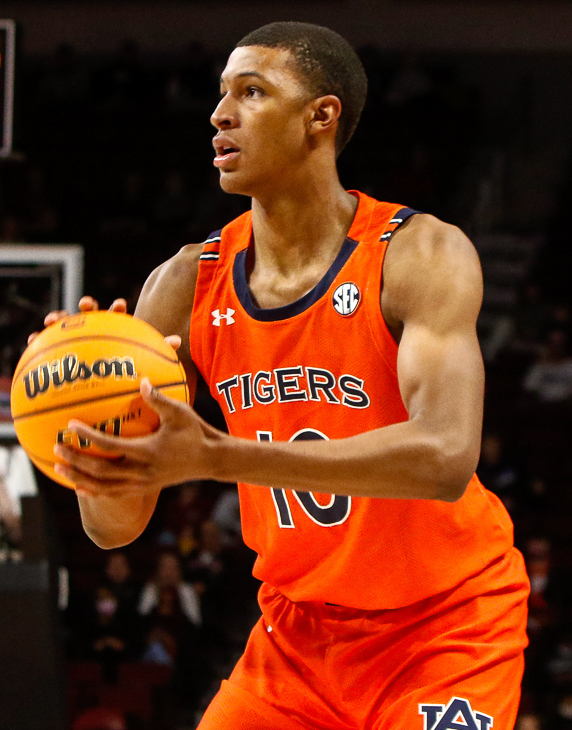
Jabari Smith, Auburn, 2022

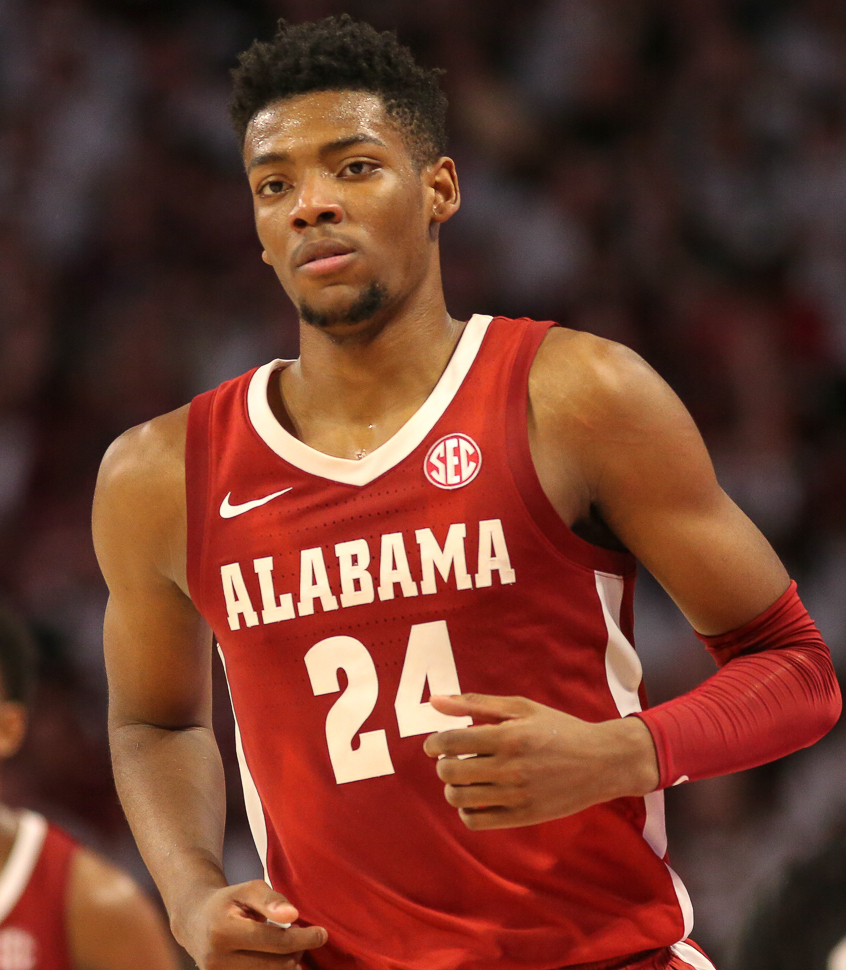
Brandon Miller, Alabama, 2023

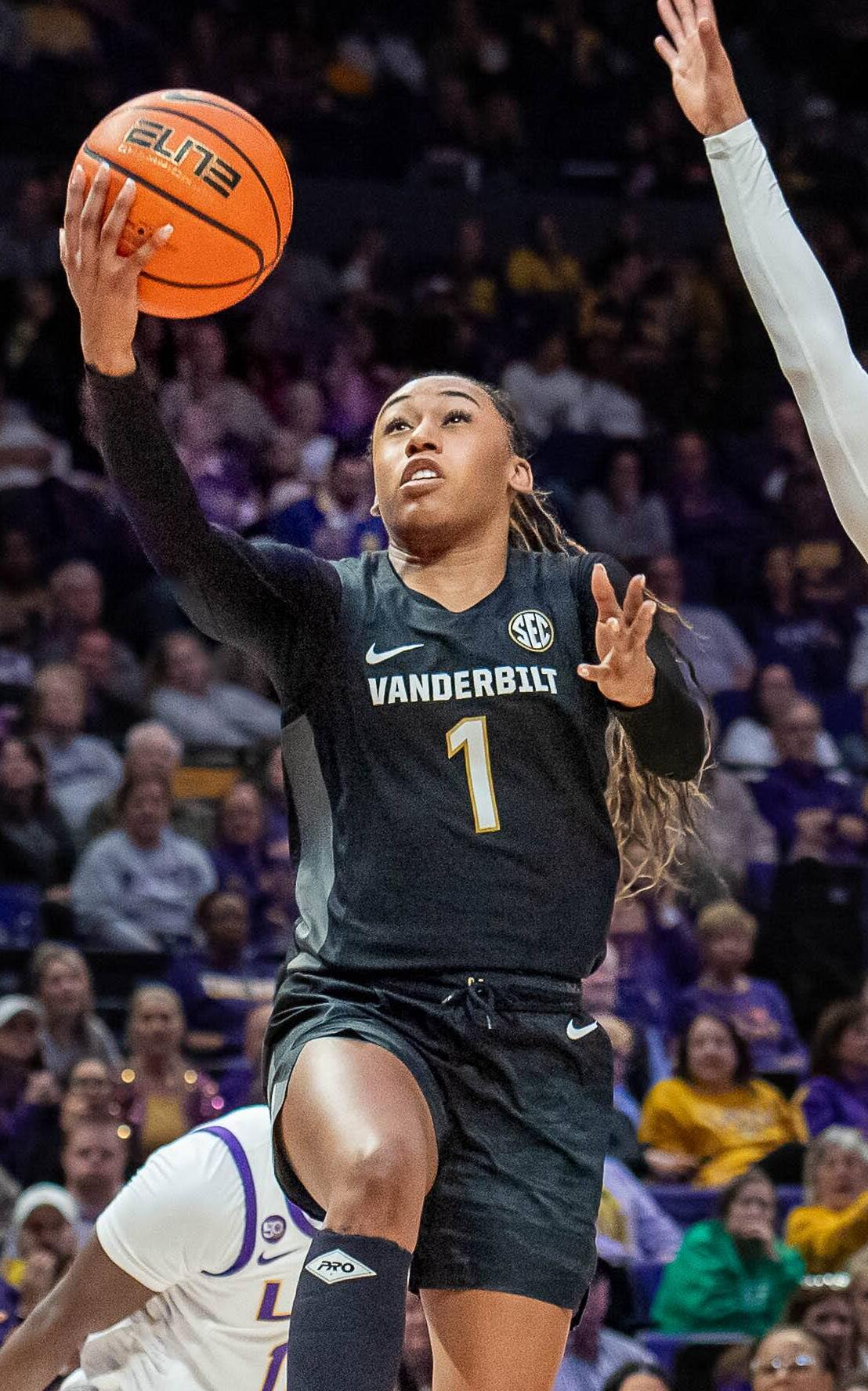
Mikayla Blakes, Vanderbilt, 2025

Men
Season	Player	School	Position	Reference
1988–89	Chris Jackson^{[b]}	LSU	PG	
1989–90	Kenny Anderson	Georgia Tech	PG	
1990–91	Rodney Rogers	Wake Forest	PF	
1991–92	Chris Webber	Michigan	C	
1992–93	Jason Kidd	California	PG	
1993–94	Joe Smith	Maryland	PF / C	
1994–95	No award^{[c]}			
1995–96	No award^{[c]}			
1996–97	No award^{[c]}			
1997–98	Larry Hughes	Saint Louis	SG	
1998–99	Quentin Richardson	DePaul	SF / SG	
1999–00	Jason Gardner	Arizona	PG	
2000–01	Eddie Griffin	Seton Hall	C	
2001–02	T. J. Ford	Texas	PG	
2002–03	Carmelo Anthony	Syracuse	SF	
2003–04	Luol Deng	Duke	SF	
2004–05	Marvin Williams	North Carolina	PF	
2005–06	Tyler Hansbrough	North Carolina	PF / C	
2006–07	Kevin Durant*	Texas	SF	
2007–08	Michael Beasley	Kansas State	PF	
2008–09	Tyreke Evans	Memphis	PG	
2009–10	John Wall	Kentucky	PG	
2010–11	Jared Sullinger	Ohio State	PF	
2011–12	Anthony Davis*	Kentucky	C	
2012–13	Marcus Smart	Oklahoma State	PG	
2013–14	Jabari Parker	Duke	SF	
2014–15	Jahlil Okafor	Duke	C	
2015–16	Ben Simmons	LSU	PG	
2016–17	Lonzo Ball	UCLA	PG	
2017–18	Trae Young	Oklahoma	PG	
2018–19	Zion Williamson*	Duke	PF	
2019–20	Vernon Carey Jr.	Duke	C	
2020–21	Cade Cunningham	Oklahoma State	PG	
2021–22	Jabari Smith	Auburn	PF	
2022–23	Brandon Miller	Alabama	SF	
2023–24	Reed Sheppard	Kentucky	SG / PG	
2024–25	Cooper Flagg*	Duke	SG / SF	
2025–26	Cameron Boozer*	Duke	PF	

Women
Season	Player	School	Position	Reference
1988–89	No award			
1989–90	No award			
1990–91	No award			
1991–92	Niesa Johnson	Alabama	G	
1992–93	Katie Smith	Ohio State	SG / SF	
1993–94	Leslie Johnson	Purdue	F / C	
1994–95	Korie Hlede	Duquesne	SG	
1995–96	Chamique Holdsclaw	Tennessee	SF	
1996–97	Shea Ralph	UConn	PG	
1997–98	Tamika Catchings	Tennessee	SF	
1998–99	Linda Fröhlich	UNLV	C	
1999–00	LaToya Thomas	Mississippi State	F	
2000–01	Alana Beard	Duke	SG / SF	
2001–02	Jacqueline Batteast	Notre Dame	F	
2002–03	Seimone Augustus	LSU	SF	
2003–04	Tiffany Jackson	Texas	F	
2004–05^{†}	Tasha Humphrey	Georgia	C	
2004–05^{†}	Candice Wiggins	Stanford	PG / SG	
2005–06	Courtney Paris	Oklahoma	C	
2006–07	Tina Charles	UConn	C	
2007–08	Maya Moore	UConn	PF	
2008–09	Shekinna Stricklen	Tennessee	SF / G	
2009–10	Brittney Griner	Baylor	C	
2010–11	Odyssey Sims	Baylor	PG	
2011–12	Elizabeth Williams	Duke	C / PF	
2012–13	Jewell Loyd	Notre Dame	PG / SG	
2013–14	Diamond DeShields	North Carolina	SG	
2014–15	Kelsey Mitchell	Ohio State	PG / SG	
2015–16	Kristine Anigwe	California	C / PF	
2016–17	Sabrina Ionescu	Oregon	PG	
2017–18	Chennedy Carter	Texas A&M	PG	
2018–19	Rhyne Howard	Kentucky	SG	
2019–20	Aliyah Boston	South Carolina	PF / C	
2020–21^{†}	Paige Bueckers*	UConn	PG	
2020–21^{†}	Caitlin Clark	Iowa	PG	
2021–22	Aneesah Morrow	DePaul	F	
2022–23	Ta'Niya Latson	Florida State	G	
2023–24	JuJu Watkins	USC	SG	
2024–25	Mikayla Blakes	Vanderbilt	SG	
2025–26	Jazzy Davidson	USC	G	

- ^{a} Freshmen are ineligible for the third major player of the year award in women's basketball, the Wade Trophy.
- ^{b} Chris Jackson legally changed his name to Mahmoud Abdul-Rauf in 1991 upon his conversion to Islam.
- ^{c} No award was presented to the men from 1995 to 1997, although the USBWA website does not indicate the reason.

== See also ==
- Oscar Robertson Trophy – the USBWA's national men's college player of the year award
- USBWA Women's National Player of the Year
- USBWA Most Courageous Award – presented to figures associated with college basketball who have "demonstrated extraordinary courage reflecting honor on the sport of amateur basketball"
