= Lee Buchanan =

Lee Buchanan may refer to:

- H. Lee Buchanan III (born 1949), United States Assistant Secretary of the Navy
- Lee Buchanan (basketball) (born 1961), American college basketball coach
- Lee Buchanan (footballer) (born 2001), English association footballer for Birmingham City
- Lee L. Buchanan (1893–1958), American entomologist
