= 1991–92 Clemson Tigers women's basketball team =

Women's college basketball season

1991–92 Clemson Tigers women's basketball

NCAA Tournament, Second Round
- Conference: Atlantic Coast Conference

Ranking
- Coaches: No. 19
- AP: No. 20
- Record: 21–10 (9–7 ACC)
- Head coach: Jim Davis (5th season)
- Home arena: Littlejohn Coliseum

The 1991–92 Clemson Tigers women's basketball team represented Clemson University during the 1991–92 NCAA Division I women's basketball season. The Tigers were led by fifth year head coach Jim Davis. The Tigers, members of the Atlantic Coast Conference, played their home games at Littlejohn Coliseum.

== Schedule ==
Date time, TV	Rank^{#}	Opponent^{#}	Result	Record	Site city, state
November 22, 1991*	No. 20	vs. UNC–Charlotte; Vanderbilt Tournament	W 66–54	1–0	Memorial Gymnasium; Nashville, Tennessee
November 23, 1991*	No. 20	at No. 8 Vanderbilt; Vanderbilt Tournament	L 60–72	1–1	Memorial Gymnasium; Nashville, Tennessee
November 27, 1991*	No. 22	at Furman	W 94–57	2–1	Greenville Memorial Auditorium; Greenville, South Carolina
November 30, 1991*	No. 22	Charleston Southern	W 113–48	3–1	Littlejohn Coliseum; Clemson, South Carolina
December 4, 1991*	No. 20	at South Carolina State	W 78–56	4–1	SHM Memorial Center; Orangeburg, South Carolina
December 7, 1991*	No. 20	Appalachian State	W 81–54	5–1	Littlejohn Coliseum; Clemson, South Carolina
December 14, 1991*	No. 19	Furman	W 90–75	6–1	Littlejohn Coliseum; Clemson, South Carolina
December 20, 1991*	No. 18	vs. Wright State; South Florida Tournament	W 72–44	7–1	USF Sun Dome; Tampa, Florida
December 21, 1991*	No. 18	at South Florida; South Florida Tournament	W 90–83	8–1	USF Sun Dome; Tampa, Florida
January 4, 1992	No. 12	at No. 13 NC State	L 85–86	8–2 (0–1)	Reynolds Coliseum; Raleigh, North Carolina
January 10, 1992	No. 15	at Duke	W 107–72	9–2 (1–1)	Cameron Indoor Stadium; Durham, North Carolina
January 12, 1992	No. 15	at North Carolina	L 56–72	9–3 (1–2)	Carmichael Arena; Chapel Hill, North Carolina
January 15, 1992	No. 17	Florida State	W 80–73	10–3 (2–2)	Littlejohn Coliseum; Clemson, South Carolina
January 18, 1992	No. 17	at No. 1 Virginia	L 52–85	10–4 (2–3)	University Hall; Charlottesville, Virginia
January 20, 1992	No. 15	at No. 1 Maryland	L 59–63	10–5 (2–4)	Cole Field House; College Park, Maryland
January 22, 1992	No. 15	at Georgia Tech	W 73–69	11–5 (3–4)	Alexander Memorial Coliseum; Atlanta, Georgia
January 25, 1992	No. 15	Wake Forest	W 80–62	12–5 (4–4)	Littlejohn Coliseum; Clemson, South Carolina
February 1, 1992	No. 15	at Florida State	L 66–79	12–6 (4–5)	Tallahassee–Leon County Civic Center; Tallahassee, Florida
February 4, 1992	No. 18	Georgia Tech	L 57–59	12–7 (4–6)	Littlejohn Coliseum; Clemson, South Carolina
February 8, 1992	No. 18	NC State	W 88–72	13–7 (5–6)	Littlejohn Coliseum; Clemson, South Carolina
February 10, 1992	No. 18	at Wake Forest	W 73–56	14–7 (6–6)	LJVM Coliseum; Winston-Salem, North Carolina
February 12, 1992*	No. 23	South Carolina rivalry	W 81–69	15–7 (6–6)	Littlejohn Coliseum; Clemson, South Carolina
February 15, 1992	No. 23	No. 1 Maryland	W 72–55	16–7 (7–6)	Littlejohn Coliseum; Clemson, South Carolina
February 19, 1992	No. 19	No. 23 North Carolina	W 49–46	17–7 (8–6)	Littlejohn Coliseum; Clemson, South Carolina
February 22, 1992	No. 19	No. 1 Virginia	L 81–85	17–8 (8–7)	Littlejohn Coliseum; Clemson, South Carolina
February 27, 1992*	No. 19	Oral Roberts	W 98–54	18–8 (8–7)	Littlejohn Coliseum; Clemson, South Carolina
February 29, 1992	No. 19	Duke	W 63–59	19–8 (9–7)	Littlejohn Coliseum; Clemson, South Carolina
ACC Tournament
March 7, 1992*	No. 18	vs. NC State; ACC Tournament quarterfinal	W 96–93 ^{OT}	20–8 (9–7)	Winthrop Coliseum; Rock Hill, South Carolina
March 8, 1992*	No. 18	vs. Georgia Tech; ACC Tournament semifinal	L 73–74	20–9 (9–7)	Winthrop Coliseum; Rock Hill, South Carolina
NCAA Tournament
March 18, 1992*	No. 20	Chattanooga; NCAA Tournament first round	W 76–72	21–9 (9–7)	Littlejohn Coliseum; Clemson, South Carolina
March 22, 1992*	No. 20	at No. 11 West Virginia; NCAA Tournament second round	L 72–73	21–10 (9–7)	WVU Coliseum; Morgantown, West Virginia
*Non-conference game. ^{#}Rankings from AP Poll. (#) Tournament seedings in parentheses.
