= Cheryl Burnett =

American basketball coach and player

Biographical details
- Born: June 13, 1958 (age 68); Centralia, Missouri, U.S.

Playing career
- 1976–1980: Kansas
- Position: Guard

Coaching career (HC unless noted)
- 1980–1981: Lawrence HS (asst)
- 1981–1984: Illinois (asst.)
- 1984–1987: Southwest Missouri State (asst)
- 1987–2002: Southwest Missouri State
- 2003–2007: Michigan

Head coaching record
- Overall: 354–219 (.618)

Accomplishments and honors

Championships
- 2× NCAA Regional—Final Four (1992, 2001); 7× MVC Regular season champion; 4× MVC tournament champion; 3× GCAC Regular season champion; 2× GCAC Tournament champion (1991, 1992)

Awards
- Southwest Missouri State Hall of Fame; Missouri Valley Conference Hall of Fame

Cheryl Elaine Burnett (born June 13, 1958) is an American former women's college basketball coach and player. She was the head coach of the Southwest Missouri State women's basketball team from 1987 to 2002. At Southwest Missouri State, she compiled a 319–136 record (.701) and led her teams to the Final Four of the NCAA tournament in 1992 and 2001. She also served as the head coach of the Michigan Wolverines women's basketball team from 2003 to 2007, compiling a record of 35–83 (.297). She played college basketball at the University of Kansas from 1976 to 1980.

== Playing career ==
Burnett is a native of Centralia, Missouri. She played basketball at Centralia High School where she was selected as an All-American during her senior year.

Burnett received a scholarship to play basketball at the University of Kansas. She was the first woman to receive a full athletic scholarship to that university. She was a starter at the guard position for the Kansas Jayhawks women's basketball team for all four years from 1976 to 1980. In 1977, she was selected as a Big Eight Conference All-Tournament player.

=== Kansas statistics ===
Legend
GP	Games played	GS	Games started	MPG	Minutes per game
FG%	Field goal percentage	3P%	3-point field goal percentage	FT%	Free throw percentage
RPG	Rebounds per game	APG	Assists per game	SPG	Steals per game
BPG	Blocks per game	PPG	Points per game	**Bold**	Career high

Year	Team	GP	Points	FG%	3P%	FT%	RPG	APG	SPG	BPG	PPG
1976–77	Kansas	24	240	33.8%	–	**77.2%**	**3.7**				**10.0**
1977–78	Kansas	28	**278**	36.1%	–	68.4%	3.8				9.9
1978–79	Kansas	**38**	183	**40.0%**	–	55.6%	2.5	1.6	1.3	**0.2**	4.8
1979–80	Kansas	37	211	37.4%	–	70.7%	2.7	**2.9**	**1.5**	0.1	5.7
Career		127	912	36.5%	–	69.9%	3.1	1.3	0.8	0.1	7.2

== Coaching career ==
=== Early years ===
Burnett was drafted to play professional basketball by the New Jersey Gems of the Women's Professional Basketball League. She opted instead to pursue a career in coaching. In 1980, after graduating from Kansas, Burnett began her coaching career as an assistant girls' basketball coach at Lawrence High School in Lawrence, Kansas. In August 1981, she was hired as an assistant coach for the University of Illinois women's basketball team.

=== Southwest Missouri State ===
In 1984, Burnett was hired as an assistant coach of the Southwest Missouri State women's basketball team in Springfield, Missouri. She became the head coach in 1987 and held that post for 15 years from 1987 to 2002. Her teams won nine Missouri Valley Conference championships, received invitations to the NCAA Division I women's basketball tournament 10 times, and advanced to the Final Four in 1992 and 2001. She compiled an overall record of 319–136 (.701) at Southwest Missouri State. Players recruited and developed by Burnett include Jackie Stiles who set the NCAA career scoring record with 3,393 points. In April 2002, Burnett resigned her post at Southwest Missouri State, indicating that she intended to look for another job.

== University of Michigan ==
In December 2003, Burnett was hired by the University of Michigan as the head coach of the Michigan Wolverines women's basketball team. In four seasons at Michigan, Burnett compiled an overall record of 35–83 (.297) and a record of 10–54 (.156) against Big Ten Conference opponents. Her teams lost 20 or more games in her last three seasons at Michigan and finished in last place in the Big Ten in 2005 and 2006 and in 10th place in 2007. She retired as Michigan's head coach in March 2007.

== Honors ==
In February 2003, Burnett was inducted into the Southwest Missouri State Hall of Fame. In October 2009, she was also inducted into Missouri Valley Conference Hall of Fame.

== Head coaching record ==
Record table
Season	Team	Overall	Conference	Standing	Postseason
Southwest Missouri State Bears (Gateway Collegiate Athletic Conference) (1987–1992)
1987–88	Southwest Missouri State	9–17	6–12	T–6th	
1988–89	Southwest Missouri State	7–20	5–13	8th	
1989–90	Southwest Missouri State	19–8	14–4	T–1st	
1990–91	Southwest Missouri State	26–5	16–2	1st	NCAA second round
1991–92	Southwest Missouri State	31–3	17–1	1st	NCAA Final Four
Southwest Missouri State Bears (Missouri Valley Conference) (1992–2002)
1992–93	Southwest Missouri State	23–9	14–2	1st	NCAA Sweet Sixteen
1993–94	Southwest Missouri State	24–6	15–1	1st	NCAA second round
1994–95	Southwest Missouri State	21–12	14–4	1st	NCAA second round
1995–96	Southwest Missouri State	25–5	16–2	1st	NCAA first round
1996–97	Southwest Missouri State	17–10	13–5	T–2nd	
1997–98	Southwest Missouri State	24–6	14–4	2nd	NCAA first round
1998–99	Southwest Missouri State	25–7	15–3	1st	NCAA second round
1999–2000	Southwest Missouri State	23–9	14–4	T–2nd	NCAA first round
2000–01	Southwest Missouri State	29–6	16–2	T–1st	NCAA Final Four
2001–02	Southwest Missouri State	16–13	12–6	3rd	WNIT First Round
Southwest Missouri State:		319–136 (.701)	201–65 (.756)		
Michigan Wolverines (Big Ten Conference) (2003–2007)
2003–04	Michigan	14–17	6–10	7th	
2004–05	Michigan	5–23	1–15	11th	
2005–06	Michigan	6–23	0–16	11th	
2006–07	Michigan	10–20	3–13	10th	
Michigan:		35–83 (.297)	10–54 (.156)		
Total:		354–219 (.618)			
National champion Postseason invitational champion Conference regular season champion Conference regular season and conference tournament champion Division regular season champion Division regular season and conference tournament champion Conference tournament champion
