= 1992 Gateway Collegiate Athletic Conference basketball tournament =

1992 Gateway Collegiate Athletic Conference women's basketball tournament
- Classification: Division I
- Teams: 4
- Semifinals site: Campus sites
- Finals site: Hammons Student Center; Springfield, Missouri
- Champions: Southwest Missouri State (2nd title)
- Winning coach: Cheryl Burnett (2nd title)
- Gateway Collegiate Athletic Conference women's basketball tournaments

1991–92 Gateway Collegiate Athletic Conference women's basketball standings
| | Conf. | | | | Overall |
| Team | W | | L | PCT | W | | L | PCT |
|---|---|---|---|---|---|---|---|---|
| No. 10 SW Missouri State † | 17 | – | 1 | .944 | 31 | – | 3 | .912 |
| Southern Illinois | 14 | – | 4 | .778 | 23 | – | 8 | .742 |
| Bradley | 11 | – | 7 | .611 | 17 | – | 11 | .607 |
| Illinois State | 11 | – | 7 | .611 | 14 | – | 14 | .500 |
| Wichita State | 10 | – | 8 | .556 | 13 | – | 16 | .448 |
| Drake | 7 | – | 11 | .389 | 11 | – | 15 | .423 |
| Indiana State | 7 | – | 11 | .389 | 10 | – | 17 | .370 |
| Western Illinois | 5 | – | 13 | .278 | 9 | – | 18 | .333 |
| Eastern Illinois | 4 | – | 14 | .222 | 8 | – | 19 | .296 |
| Northern Iowa | 3 | – | 15 | .167 | 4 | – | 23 | .148 |
† 1992 GCAC tournament winner Rankings from AP Poll

The 1992 Gateway Collegiate Athletic Conference basketball tournament was part of the 1991–92 NCAA Division I women's basketball season and was played March 11 and 14, 1992.

== Tournament bracket ==
Semifinals; Wednesday, March 11
1 | SW Missouri State | 88
4 | Bradley | 59
3 | Illinois State | 64
2 | Southern Illinois | 78

Championship; Saturday, March 14
1 | SW Missouri State | 86
2 | Southern Illinois | 69

* denotes overtime

== See also ==
- 1992 Missouri Valley Conference men's basketball tournament
