= 1991–92 Iowa Hawkeyes women's basketball team =

Intercollegiate basketball season

1991–92 Iowa Hawkeyes women's basketball

Big Ten Conference regular season champions

NCAA tournament, Second round
- Conference: Big Ten Conference

Ranking
- Coaches: No. 10
- AP: No. 7
- Record: 25–4 (16–2 Big Ten)
- Head coach: C. Vivian Stringer (9th season)
- Home arena: Carver–Hawkeye Arena

1991–92 Big Ten women's basketball standings
	Conf.				Overall
Team	W		L	PCT	W		L	PCT
No. 7 Iowa	16	–	2	.889	25	–	4	.862
No. 11 Purdue	14	–	4	.778	23	–	7	.767
Wisconsin	13	–	5	.722	20	–	9	.690
Northwestern	10	–	8	.556	17	–	10	.630
Ohio State	9	–	9	.500	15	–	13	.536
Indiana	8	–	10	.444	16	–	12	.571
Michigan State	8	–	10	.444	14	–	14	.500
Illinois	6	–	12	.333	9	–	19	.321
Minnesota	3	–	15	.167	8	–	19	.296
Michigan	3	–	15	.167	7	–	21	.250
Rankings from AP Poll

The 1991–1992 Iowa Hawkeyes women's basketball team represented the University of Iowa in the 1991–1992 NCAA women's basketball season. The Hawkeyes, led by ninth-year head coach C. Vivian Stringer, played their home games in Iowa City, IA at Carver–Hawkeye Arena as members of the Big Ten Conference. They finished the season 25–4 overall, 16–2 in Big Ten play, winning the regular season conference championship. After reaching the NCAA tournament for the seventh consecutive season, Iowa was upset by No. 8 seed and eventual Final Four participant SW Missouri State, 61–60 in overtime, in the second round of the 1992 women's NCAA basketball tournament.

== Roster ==
1991–92 Iowa Hawkeyes women's basketball team
Players
Coaches

Pos.	#	Name	Height	Year	Previous school	Hometown
G	10	Arneda Yarbrough	5 ft 5 in (1.65 m)	So	William Horlick	Racine, WI
G	12	Laurie Aaron	5 ft 6 in (1.68 m)	Jr	Murray-Wright	Detroit, MI
F	15	Virgie Dilingham	5 ft 10 in (1.78 m)	So	Madison Central	Richmond, KY
F	33	Tia Jackson	6 ft 0 in (1.83 m)	So	Mardela	Mardela Springs, MD
F	54	Toni Foster	6 ft 1 in (1.85 m)	Jr	Marshall	Chicago, IL

Head coach

- C. Vivian Stringer

Assistant coach(es)

Legend

- (C) Team captain
- (S) Suspended
- (I) Ineligible
- (W) Walk-on
- Injured
- Current redshirt

== Schedule and results ==
Date time, TV	Rank^{#}	Opponent^{#}	Result	Record	Site (attendance) city, state
Regular season
Mar 8, 1992	No. 7	Wisconsin	W 63–36	24–3 (15–2)	Carver-Hawkeye Arena; Iowa City, Iowa
Mar 12, 1992	No. 7	at Minnesota	W 65–47	25–3 (16–2)	Williams Arena; Minneapolis, Minnesota
NCAA tournament
Mar 22, 1992*	(1 MW) No. 7	(8 MW) SW Missouri State; Second round	L 60–61 ^{OT}	25–4	Carver-Hawkeye Arena; Iowa City, Iowa
*Non-conference game. ^{#}Rankings from AP Poll. (#) Tournament seedings in parentheses. ME=Mideast. All times are in Central.
