= Mary Foley Benson =

American scientific illustrator

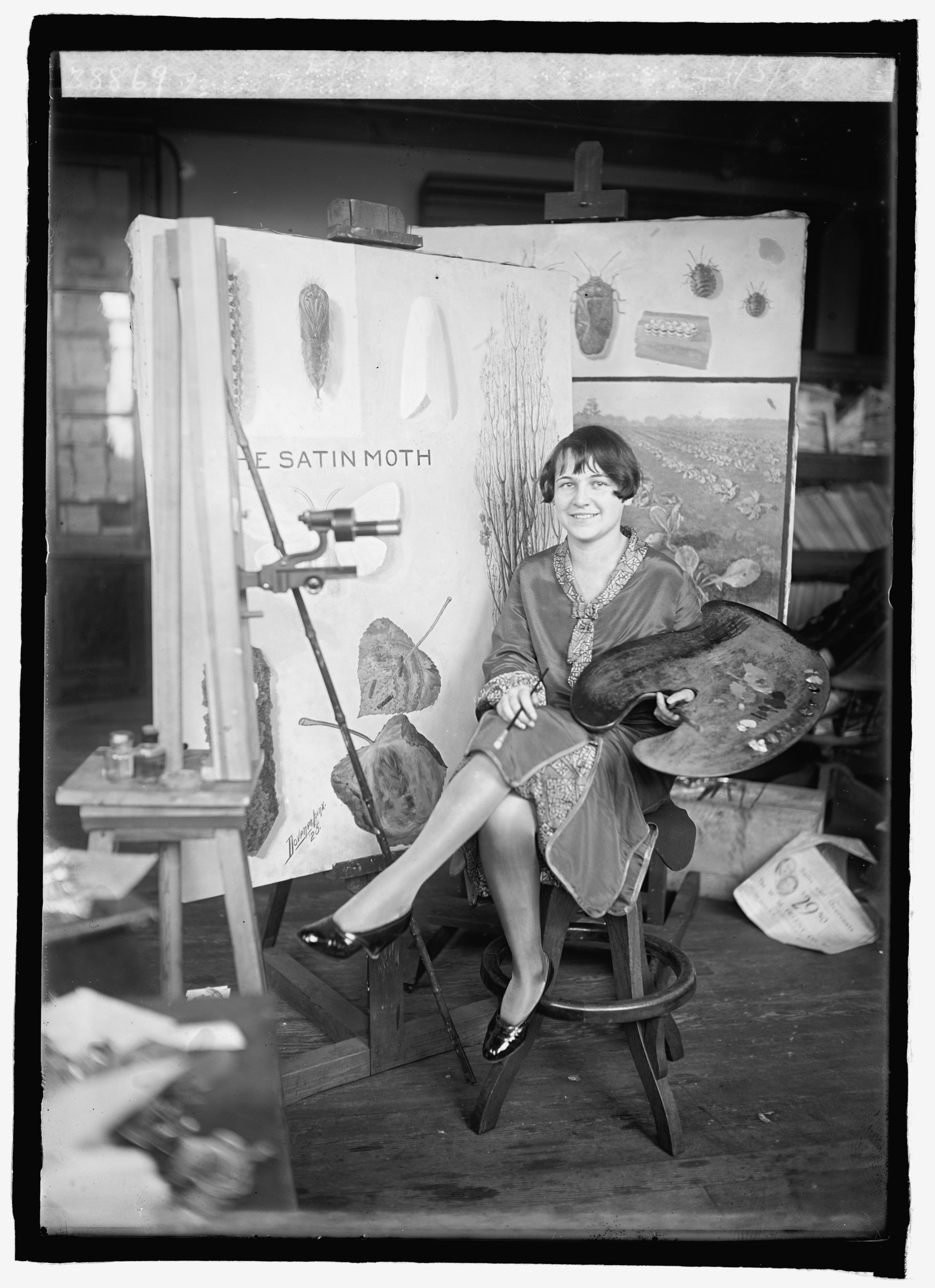
"Miss Mary C. Foley, Artist at Dept. of Agriculture," 1/5/26.

Mary Foley Benson (April 2, 1905 – June 18, 1992) was an American scientific illustrator and fine artist. She specialized in detailed, realistic watercolor paintings of plants and insects.

== Early life, education and career ==
She was born in Storm Lake, Iowa, as Mary Carilla Foley. According to 1910 census, she had two brothers and two sisters. In 1922 she moved to Washington, D.C. to live with her family friends, John Merton Aldrich and Delia (Della) Ann Aldrich, and attend college. Developing interest in scientific illustration, she took a course in entomology with Dr. Aldrich, who at the time was the associate curator of insects at the United States National Museum. Possibly thanks to him, Foley soon got her first job at the United States Department of Agriculture (USDA). At the National School of Fine and Applied Arts and Corcoran School of Art she studied under artists Felix Mahoney and Harry Bradford respectively, and graduated in 1927.

In 1928, she married Russell Bernard Benson, a patent lawyer and engineer at the US Patent Office, and their son John Raymond Benson was born in 1931. The couple lived in the D.C. area, and build their house the same year at Riggs Road, Langley Park, in Maryland. Mary Foley Benson worked as the senior scientific illustrator for the USDA's Bureau of Entomology and Plant Quarantine and the National Museum of Natural History, Smithsonian Institution. She collaborated with and illustrated for entomologists such as Lee L. Buchanan, Harrison Gray Dyar Jr., Carl Heinrich, Donald De Leon, Ashley Buell Gurney, R. A. Cushman, August Busck, Harry Gardner Barber, Louise M. Russell, Alan Stone, E. G. Davis, and George Paul Engelhardt. The majority of these illustrations were technical, black and white drawings of insects such as wasps, moths, true bugs, crickets, flies, weevils, roaches, and scale insects.

During her free time, in the late 1920s and during the 1930s she participated in theater and music shows, notably the Pierce Hall Players. Thanks to her younger brother Charles L. Foley who was in the aviation business, she became interested in flying, and started taking piloting classes at College Park airport in 1936. Already in 1937, she had her first flight and was second at the annual Langley Day air meet, as part of Washington Air Derby. At that time, she was the only (and possibly the first) women trustee of the Washington Aero Club.

== WWII piloting and move to California ==
Already a licensed pilot, when the WWII started Mary Foley Benson joined the Civil Air Patrol and began ferrying airplanes for the War Training Service, joining her brother at Roosevelt Field. This led to her 1943 enlistment in the U.S. Army Air Corps (Women’s Army Corps) and the famous Ninety-Nines: International Organization of Women Pilots, the latter founded by Amelia Earhart in 1929. She flew Taylor J-2 Cub, Piper J-4 Cub Coupe, and Fairchild 24 aircraft, serving as the "on-ground Link Celestial Navigation Trainer." Unfortunately, women pilots were not allowed to teach in the air at the time. According to her biography in a 1946 exhibition catalog, "so far as is known [she] is the only women with an Army M.O.S. [Military Occupational Specialty] as pilot."

With the end of the war, she divorced and moved to Los Angeles area to be with her parents. "She overstayed her time limit [at the USDA] and lost her job," and reinvented herself as a commercial artist, painting plants and clowns. Between 1948 and 1951, she attended the Otis Art Institute and studied under artist Norman Rockwell.

== UC Davis ==
In 1964, she moved to Davis, California, thanks to a job offer from professor Howard Lester McKenzie from the Department of Entomology at University of California, Davis (UC Davis). This occurred only one year after UC Davis' department became independent from UC Berkeley, under Richard M. Bohart as chair. McKenzie and Foley Benson collaborated on the well-known publication Mealybugs of California with Taxonomy, Biology and Control of North American Species (Homoptera: Coccoidea: Pseudococcidae) which came out in 1967. These watercolor illustrations feature mealybugs on their host plants and surrounding habitats, together with plant damage, identified by specific locations of collecting, dates, collectors, and species. Other illustrators who contributed to this publication, aside from Foley Benson and McKenzie himself, were Helen C. Court, Julia Z. Iltis, and Douglass R. Miller.

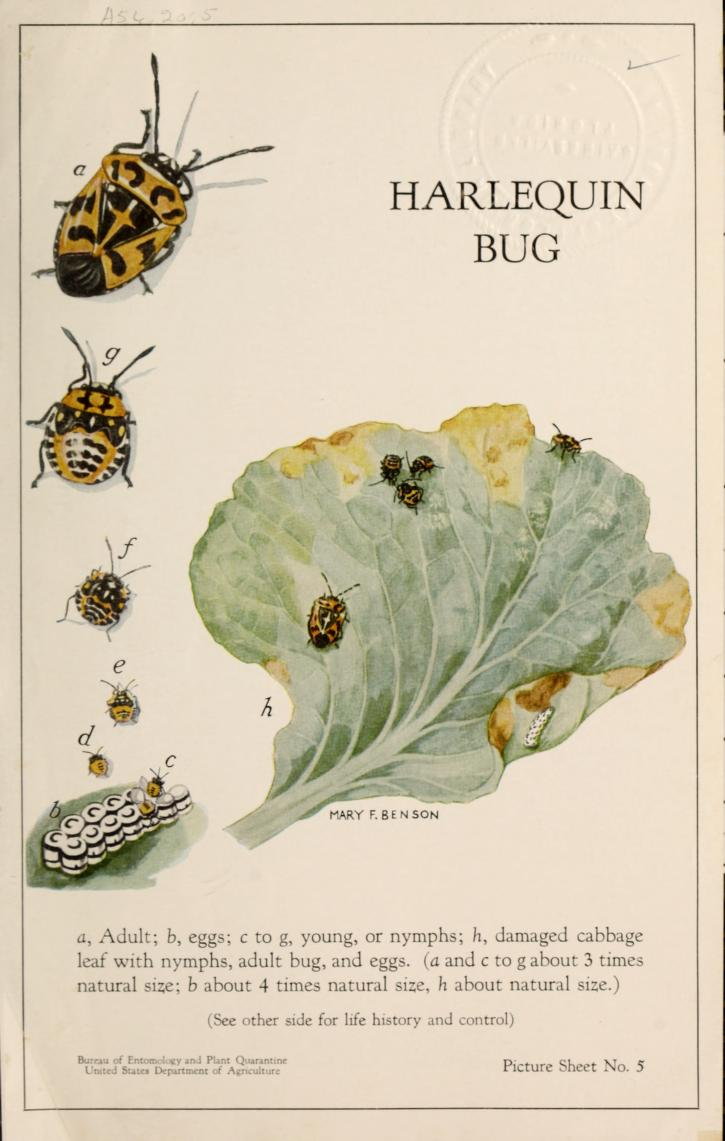
Harlequin bug by Mary F. Benson

From mid 1960s until her retirement in 1972, she worked with professor William Harry Lange, Jr., another UC Davis entomologist, on an unpublished research on various agricultural pests. Just like in the case of Mealybugs of California and an earlier publication Insects: The Yearbook of Agriculture 1952, Foley Benson juxtaposed images of insect lifecycle with their host plants and habitat. She reused a magnifying glass visual tool from Mealybugs of California to emphasize the insect specimens, some of which are only a few millimeters long. These illustrations feature a variety of agricultural crop pests such as moths, worms, maggots, flies, aphids, weevils, and plant bugs, other pests such as snails and slugs, and insect predators which feed on pests such as lacewings, sawflies and lady beetles. The Lange series were consequently donated to the Bohart Museum of Entomology by Ellen Lange, while the McKenzie collection is shared between the Bohart Museum, Department of Entomology and Shields library at UC Davis.

From her retirement in 1972 until her death in 1992, Mary Foley Benson was active in the Davis community, teaching painting and being an active Christian Scientist. She was the director of the Travis chapter of the Air Force Association, member of Ronald Reagan's Task Force, the Guild of Natural Science Illustrators, and head of the board of directors of the Davis Republican Women's Club. Her late work predominantly features botanical illustration of California's wildflowers made in watercolor and lithography. One example is the Golden Lupine, the official flower of the city of Davis, often combined with California poppy (state flower) and California dogface butterfly (state insect). This work was featured in Smithsonian Institution's exhibition called "Paintings of California Flora" in 1983 where she exhibited 45 artworks.

She died in Davis in 1992, one year after a retrospective exhibition at her home studio. According to her will, some 60 artworks were bequeathed to the Hunt Institute for Botanical Documentation in Pittsburgh, Pennsylvania. In 2022, Miller and Stocks published an article where they identified 11 new felt scale insects (Eriococcidae), including one species named in honor of the artist, Ovaticoccus maryfoleybensonae.

== Exhibitions and collections ==
While a significant amount of her work was done for scientific publications, she exhibited numerous botanical illustrations (watercolors and lithographs) in art galleries and museums, such as:

- The National Museum of Natural History, Smithsonian Institution, Washington, D.C.,
- Lansburgh Gallery, Washington, D.C.,
- Los Angeles County Museum,
- Los Angeles Art Association,
- Frances Webb Gallery, Los Angeles,
- Hollywood Association of Artists,
- University of California, Davis,
- Crocker Art Gallery, Sacramento, CA,
- Walnut Creek Art Center,
- Centennial Gallery, Berkeley, CA,
- Museum of Natural History, Pacific Grove, CA,
- Oakland Museum, Oakland, CA,
- Sayre-Webber Galleries, Modesto, CA,
- Coffee Tree Restaurant, Vacaville, CA,
- Carnegie Institute for Technology, Pittsburgh, PA,
- Cleveland Museum of Art,
- The Desert Botanical Museum, Phoenix, AZ.

Her artworks are part of collections such as:

- Bohart Museum of Entomology (Department of Entomology and Nematology) at UC Davis (W. H. Lange Collection),
- Peter J. Shields library at UC Davis (Howard Lester McKenzie collection),
- Hunt Institute for Botanical Documentation in Pittsburgh, PA,
- USDA, National Agricultural Library, in Washington, D.C.
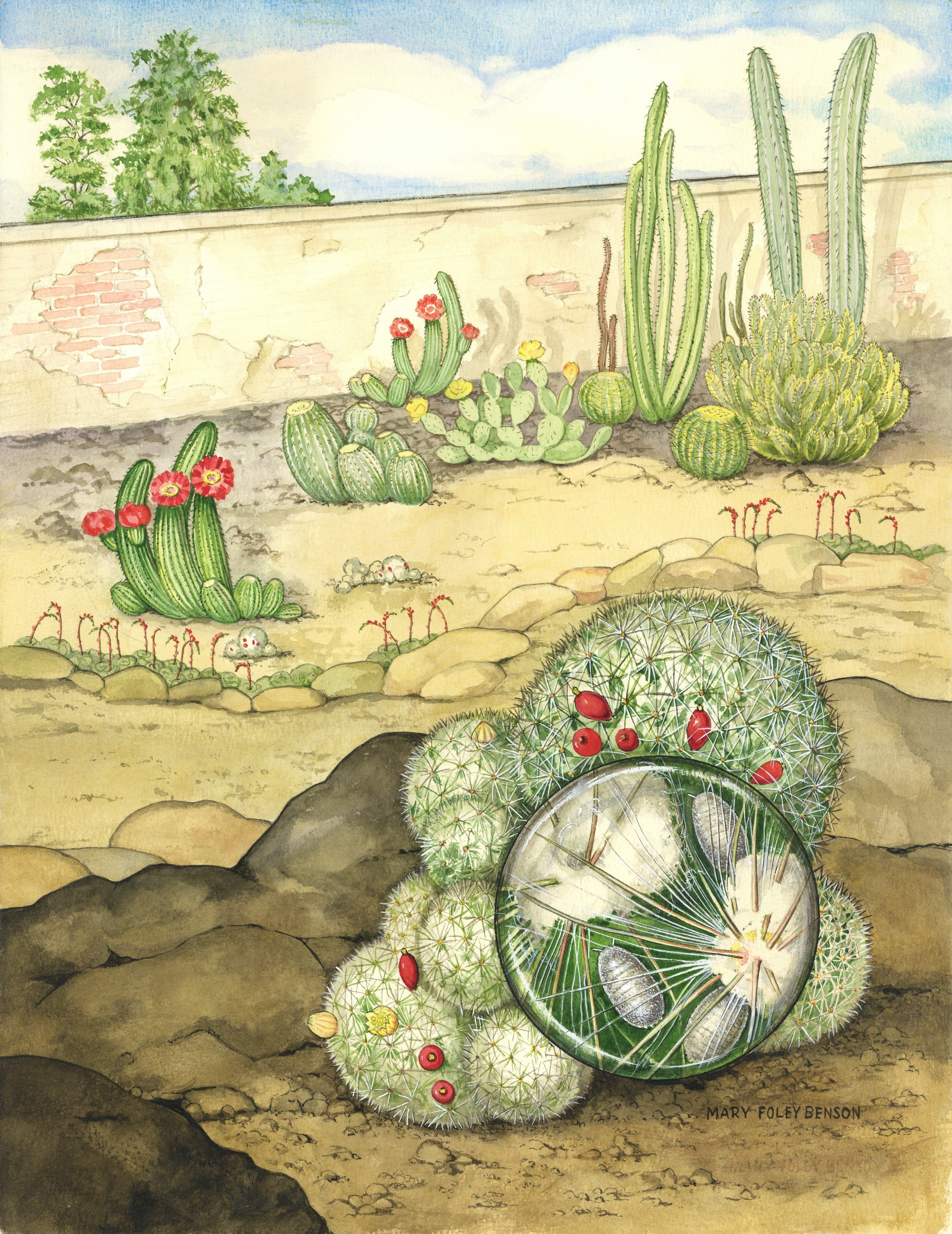
Mary Foley Benson, Spilococcus cactearum McKenzie, 1965.

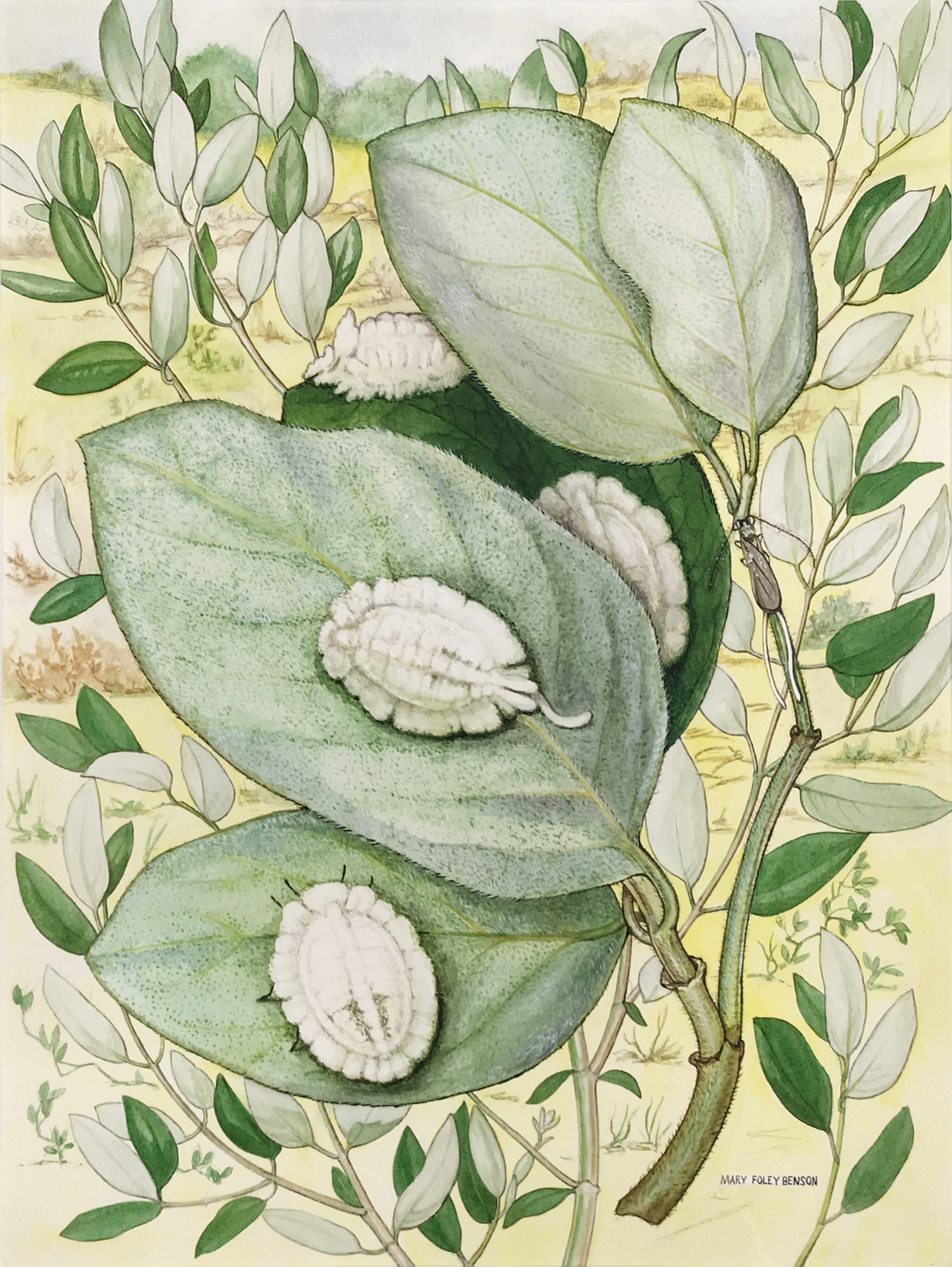
Mary Foley Benson, Large yucca mealybug on vetch silk tassel, 1964

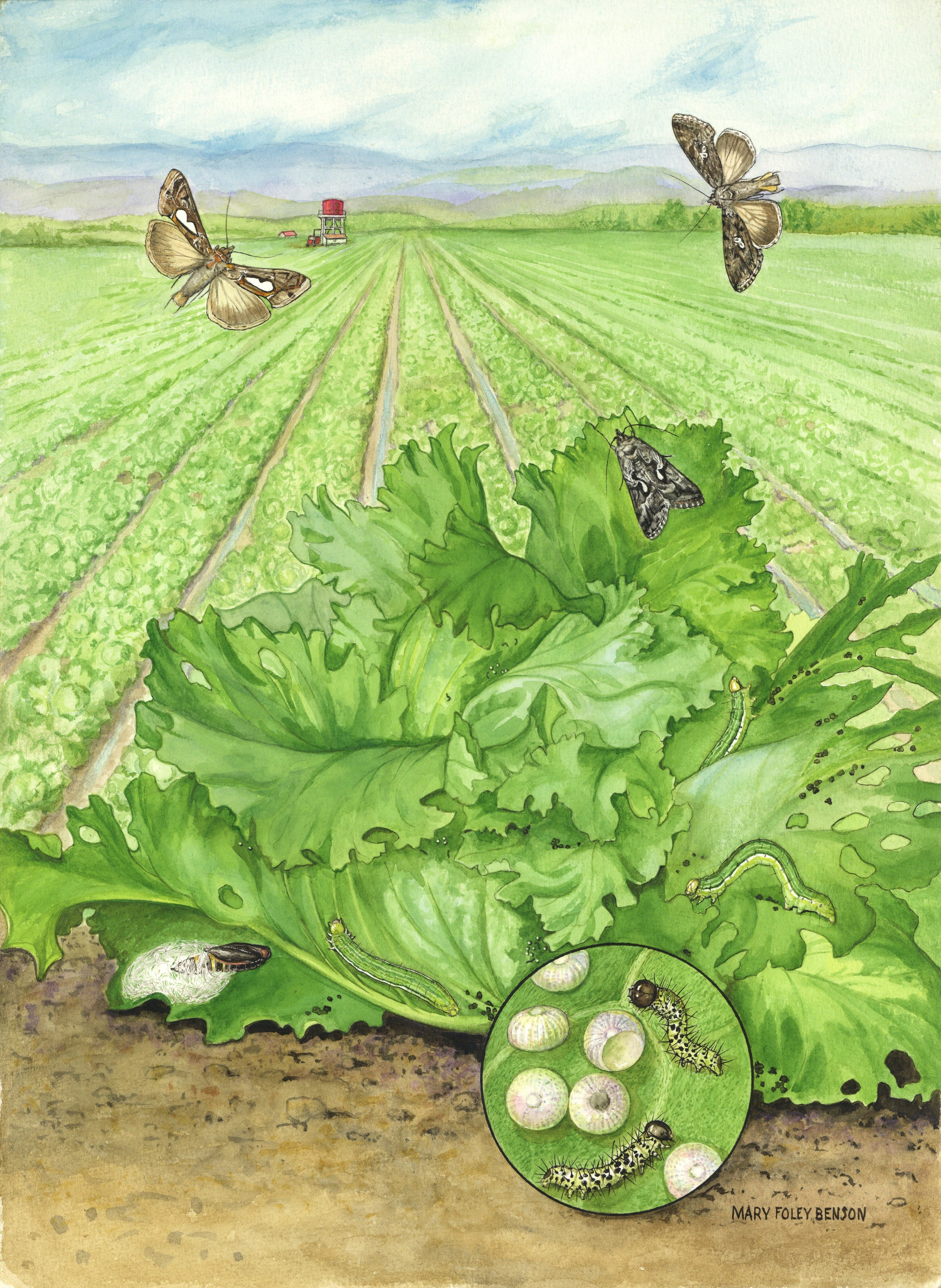
Mary Foley Benson, Autographa californica on lettuce, 1966

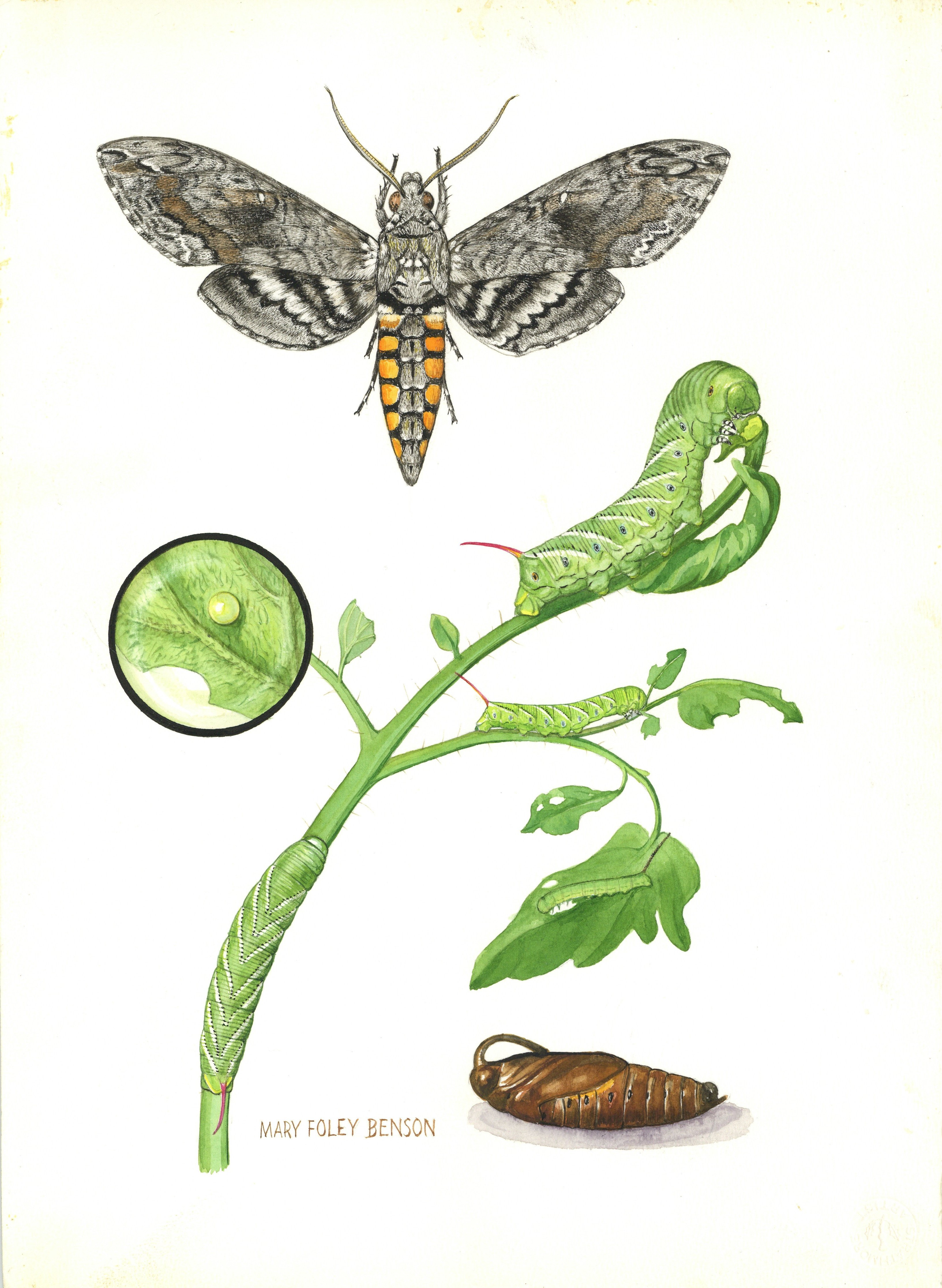
Mary Foley Benson, Tobacco hornworm on tomato, n.d.

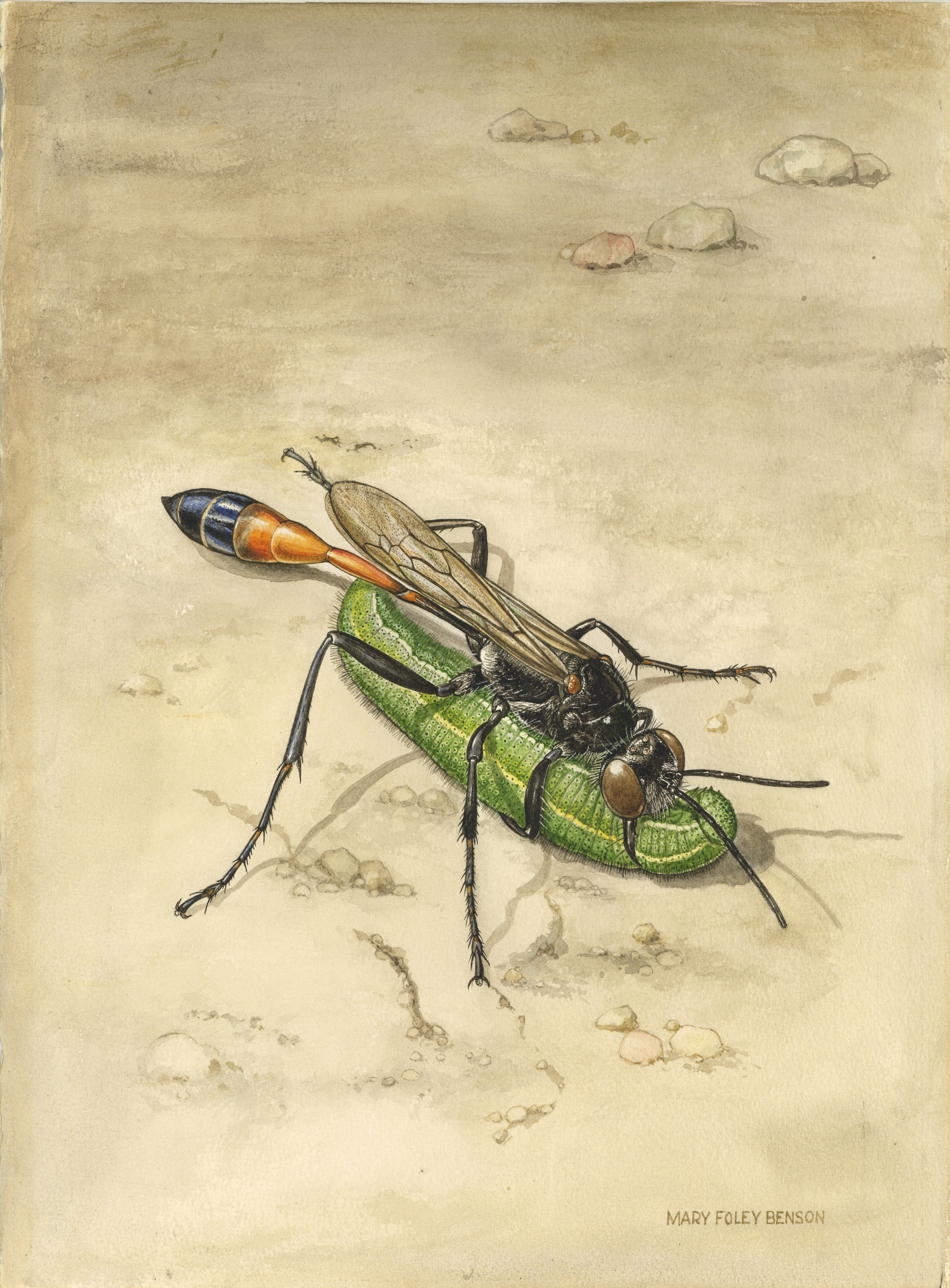
Mary Foley Benson, Ammophila azteca wasp, 1976

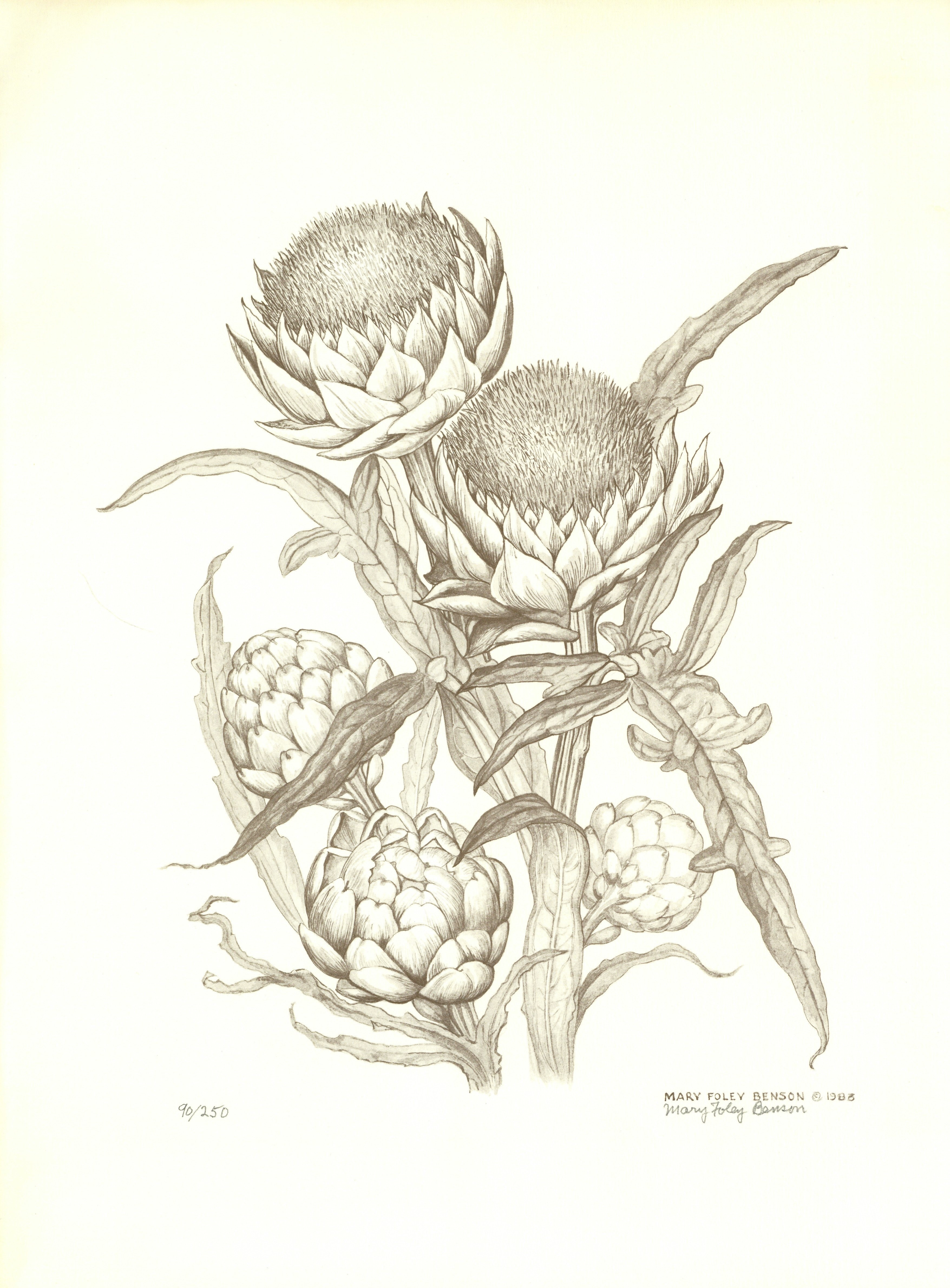
Mary Foley Benson, Artichoke, 1983

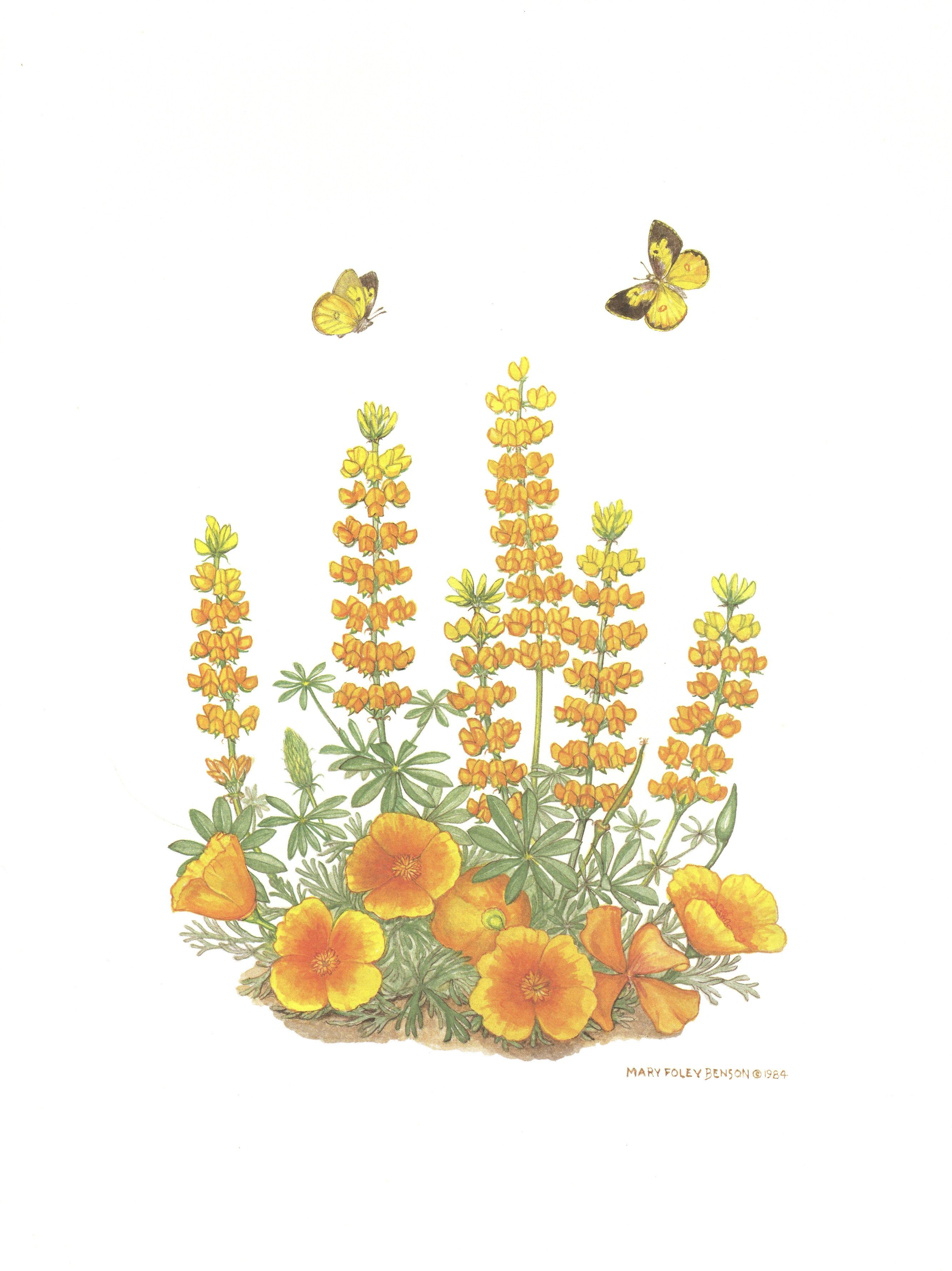
Mary Foley Benson, golden lupine, california poppy and dogface butterfly, 1984

== List of publications with Mary Foley Benson illustrations (chronological) ==
Buchanan, L. L. “North American species of the weevils of the Otiorhynchid genus Mesagroicus.” In: Proceedings of the United States National Museum, Vol. 76, No. 2801 (1929): 1-16.

Dyar, Harrison G., and Heinrich, Carl. “A New Myelois From Brazil (Lepidoptera: Pyralidae: Phycitinae).” Proceedings of the Entomological Society of Washington, Vol. 31, No. 6 (June 1929): 116-118.

Cox Athey, Lillian. “Nature’s Children.” In: The Evening Star, Washington D.C., 1933-1955.

De Leon, Donald. “The Morphology of Coeloides dendroctoni Cushman (Hymenoptera: Braconidæ).” In: Journal of the New York Entomological Society, Sep. 1934, Vol. 42, No. 3 (September 1934): 297-317.

Gurney, Ashley Buell. “Studies in Certain Genera of American Blattidae (Orthoptera).” In: Proceedings of the Entomological Society of Washington, Vol. 39, No. 5 (May 1937): 101-112.

Cushman, R. A. “A new European species of Epiurus.” In: Journal of the Washington Academy of Sciences, Vol. 28, No. 1 (Jan. 15, 1938): 27-28.

Gurney, Ashley Buell. “A synopsis of the order Zoraptera, with notes on the biology of Zorotypus Hubbardi Caudell.” In: Proceedings of the Entomological Society of Washington, Vol. 40, No. 3 (March 1938): 57-87.

Busck, August. “Restriction of the genus Gelechia (Lepidoptera: Gelechiidae), with descriptions of new genera.” In: Proceedings of the United States National Museum, Vol. 86, No. 3064 (1939): 563-610.

Gurney, Ashley Buell. Aids to the identification of the Mormon and Coulee crickets and their allies (Orthoptera; Tettigoniidae, Gryllacrididae). Washington, D.C.: United States Department of Agriculture, Bureau of Entomology and Plant Quarantine, 1939.

Barber, Harry Gardner. “Insects of Porto Rico and the Virgin Islands—Hemiptera-Heteroptera (excepting the Miridae and Corixidae).” In: Scientific survey of Porto Rico and the Virgin Islands, Volume XIV—Part 3 (July 7, 1939); 263-441.

Cushman, R. A. “New genera and species of Ichneumon-flies, with taxonomic notes.” In: Proceedings of the United States National Museum, Vol. 88, No. 3083 (1940): 355-372.

Russell, Louise M. A classification of the scale insect genus Asterolecanium. Washington, D.C.: United States Department of Agriculture (Miscellaneous Publication No. 424), 1941.

Stone, Alan. The fruitflies of the genus Anastrepha. Washington, D.C.: United States Department of Agriculture (Miscellaneous Publication No. 439), 1942.

Davis, E. G. “Apanteles diatraeae, a Braconid Parasite of the Southwestern Corn Borer.” In: United States Department of Agriculture Technical Bulletin No. 871 (May 1944): 1-19.

Engelhardt, George P. The North American clear-wing moths of the family Aegeriidae Washington, D.C.: United States National Museum (Bulletin 190), Smithsonian Institution, 1946.

Stefferud, Alfred (ed). Insects: The Yearbook of Agriculture 1952. Washington, D.C.: United States Department of Agriculture, United States Government Printing Office, 1952.

Hollister-Stier Laboratories. Plants of Allergic Importance. Los Angeles: Hollister-Stier Laboratories, 1963 (?).

Lawrence, George H. M. Catalogue of an Exhibition of Contemporary Botanical Art and Illustration 6 April to 1 September 1964. Pittsburgh, PA: Hunt Botanical Library, Carnegie Institute of Technology, 1964.

McKenzie, Howard L. Mealybugs of California, with Taxonomy, Biology, and Control of North American Species. Berkeley and Los Angeles: University of California Press, 1967.

Metcalf, Woodbridge. Introduced Trees of Central California. Berkeley: University of California Press, 1968.

Lange, W. H. and Miller, M. D. (eds). Insect and other animal pests of rice. Berkeley: University of California, 1970.

Mallars, James L. and Fowler, Jack R. (eds). Mosquito eating fishes in California. Visalia, CA: California mosquito control association, 1970.

Miller, Douglass R. and McKenzie, Howard L. “Sixth Taxonomic Study of North American Mealybugs with Additional Species from South America (Homoptera: Coccoidea: Pseudococcidae).” In: Hilgardia: A journal of agricultural science published by the California agricultural experiment station, Volume 40, Number 17 (June, 1971): 565-606.

Miller, Douglass R. and McKenzie, Howard L. “Seventh Taxonomic Study of North American Mealybugs (Homoptera: Coccoidea: Pseudococcidae).” In: Hilgardia: A journal of agricultural science published by the California agricultural experiment station, Volume 41, Number 17 (January, 1973): 489-545.

Bohart, Richard M., and Menke, Arnold S. Sphecid Wasps of the World: A Generic Revision. Berkeley: University of California Press, 1976.

Menke, Arnold S. The Ammophila of North & Central America (Hymenoptera, Sphecidae). Bisbee AZ: Ammophila Press, 2020.

Miller, Douglass R. and Stocks, Ian C. "New genera and species of felt scales (Hemiptera: Coccomorpha: Eriococcidae), with descriptions of new species and immature instars of described species." In: Zootaxa 5221 (1) (December 15, 2022): 1-213.

== Biographical sources (alphabetical) ==
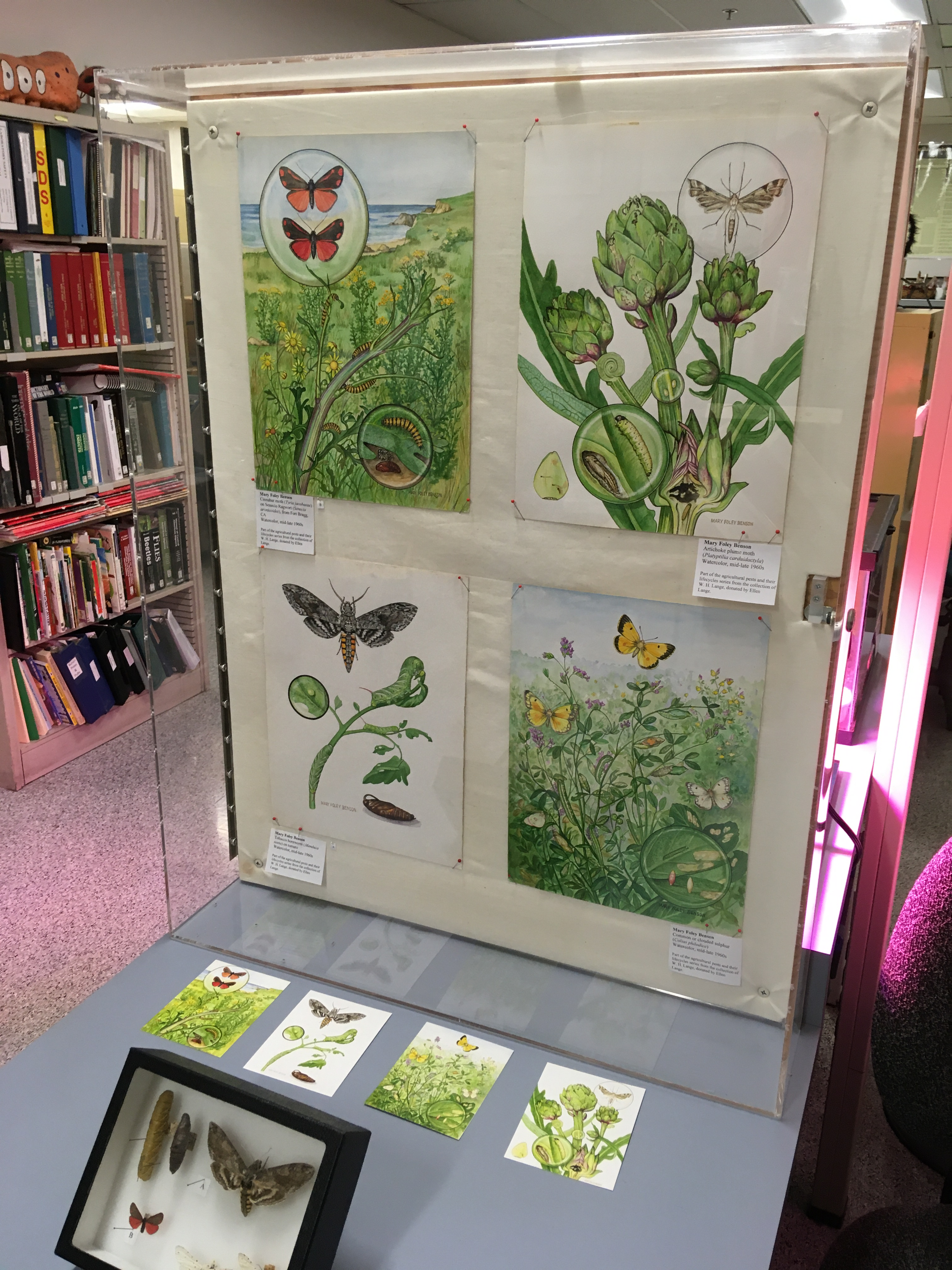
Mary Foley Benson watercolors at the Bohart Museum, 2022

Aldrich, John Merton. “Diary of a Western Trip, 1927.” In: Myia - A publication on entomology, Volume 6, edited by Paul H. Arnaud, Jr. San Francisco: California Academy of Sciences, 2001, 235-301.

Barr, Patrick. “Prominent Davis artist Benson dies.” In: The Davis Enterprise (June 21, 1992): A-2.

Beardsley, John W. “Reviewed Work(s): Mealybugs of California with Taxonomy, Biology, and Control of North American Species (Homoptera: Coccidea; Pseudococcidae) by Howard L. McKenzie.” In: The Quarterly Review of Biology, Vol. 44, No. 1 (Mar., 1969): 89-90.

Bohart Museum Society. “Museum News: New Exhibits.” In: Winter 2019 Newsletter, No. 77: 2.

Cargill, Christina (Winnie), Tannir, Joseph, Pogue, Dennis, and Nasta, Paula Jarrett. Cultural Landscape Report: Langley Park and Adelphi, Maryland. College Park, MD: The University of Maryland, 2020.

Childs, Marti. “Art for the sake of science.” In: UC Davis Magazine, Volume 8, Number 4 (Summer 1991): 22-23.

Edgerton, Joseph S. “Air Derby Association To Name Heads Tuesday.” In: The Sunday Star, Washington, D.C. (January 17, 1937, part four): F-6.

Frances Webb Galleries. Exhibition of Water Colors by Mary Foley Benson. Los Angeles, CA: Frances Webb Galleries, 1946.

Furniss, Malcolm M. “Mary Foley Benson: Master of the Art of Scientific Illustration of Insects and Flowers.” Entomology & Nematology News, Agriculture and Natural Resources, University of California (June 21, 2022).

Garvey, Kathy Keatley. “Draw-a-Bug Competition at Bohart Museum.” Bug Squad: Happenings in the insect world, Agriculture and Natural Resources, University of California (December 10, 2012).

Garvey, Kathy Keatley. “Bohart Museum Theme: ‘Insects and Art’ on Dec. 20.” Entomology & Nematology News, Agriculture and Natural Resources, University of California (December 10, 2014).

Garvey, Kathy Keatley. “Zeroing on the Life of Scientific Illustrator Mary Foley Benson.” Bug Squad: Happenings in the insect world, Agriculture and Natural Resources, University of California (October 6, 2022).

Haag, Jan. “A Californian’s Flora Fantasy.” In: The Sacramento Bee, Sunday Woman (July 24, 1983): 10-11.

Hudson, Jeff. “Botanical artist bound for DHS Hall of Fame.” In: The Davis Enterprise (August 31, 2015).

Hunt Botanical Library. Biographical Data Sheet – Mary Foley Benson. Pittsburgh, PA: Carnegie Institute of Technology, 1964.

Lawrence, George H. M. Catalogue of an Exhibition of Contemporary Botanical Art and Illustration 6 April to 1 September 1964. Pittsburgh, PA: Hunt Botanical Library, Carnegie Institute of Technology, 1964.

Lewis, Rae. “Vocation and Avocation Combined by D.C. Artist.” In The Washington Post (October 17, 1937): S9.

Melcher, E. de S. “Piccoli Art Magnifies Puppet Entertainment.” In: The Evening Star, Washington D.C. (July 14, 1933): B-10.

Melcher, E. de S. “Fine Array of Pictures For Thanksgiving Week.” In: The Evening Star, Washington D.C. (November 29, 1934): A-8.

National Museum of Natural History, Smithsonian Institution. Paintings of California Flora by Mary Foley Benson, April 30-June 26, 1983. Washington, D.C.: National Museum of Natural History, Smithsonian Institution, 1983.

Reese, Laura. “Mary Foley Bensen [sic]: The army says she’s a rare bird.” In: The Daily Democrat (October 11, 1972): 4.

Robertson, Kathy. “Doing as she pleases. Neighbor spotlight: Mary Foley Benson.” In: The Davis Enterprise (Monday, April 20, 1987): 15.

Russell, Louise M. “Mealybugs of California with Taxonomy, Biology and Control of North American Species (Homoptera: Coccoidea: Pseudococcidae).” In: Bulletin of the Entomological Society of America, Volume 14, Issue 2 (15 June 1968): 140.

The City of Davis. “Golden Lupine.” Cityofdavis.org.

The Evening Star. “Society.” In: The Evening Star, Washington D.C. (April 3, 1928): 10.

The Evening Star. “Church players to give ‘Kempy’ tomorrow night.” In: The Evening Star, Washington D.C. (May 3, 1929): 7.

The Evening Star. “Pierce Hall Players.” In: The Evening Star, Washington D.C. (March 22, 1931, part four): 2.

The Evening Star. “Capt. and Mrs. Winans Hosts to Party of 22 At Dinner Dance Here.” In: The Evening Star (The Sunday Star), Washington D.C. (November 27, 1932): 10.

The Evening Star. “’Little white mice’ to be given Wednesday.” In: The Evening Star, Washington D.C. (July 7, 1933): B-4.

The Evening Star. “Players to Present Comedy.” In: The Evening Star, Washington D.C. (July 9, 1933, part four): B-3.

The Evening Star. “Helms-Rodon Play.” In: The Evening Star, Washington D.C. (January 7, 1934, part four): F-10.

The Evening Star. “Washington’s Players.” In: The Evening Star (The Sunday Star), Washington D.C. (January 21, 1934, part four): F-7.

The Evening Star. “Pierce Hall Players Appear This Week.” In: The Evening Star, Washington D.C. (April 22, 1934, part three): E-6.

The Evening Star. “Baer Comedy in Rehearsal.” In: The Evening Star, Washington D.C. (June 3, 1934, part four): F-4.

The Evening Star. “Society.” In: The Evening Star, Washington D.C. (June 22, 1934): B-9.

The Evening Star. “’44 Below’ Tuesday.” In: The Evening Star, Washington D.C. (November 25, 1934, part four): F-5.

The Evening Star. “Melcher’s new play is brittle.” In: The Evening Star, Washington D.C. (November 28, 1934, part four): B-12.

The Evening Star. “Local Players.” In: The Evening Star (The Sunday Star), Washington D.C. (December 2, 1934, part four): F-5.

The Evening Star. “Unitarian Bazaar Dramatics Planned.” In: The Evening Star, Washington D.C. (December 3, 1934): B-8.

The Evening Star. “’The Ghost Train’ is group’s final play.” In: The Evening Star, Washington D.C. (May 23, 1935): C-2.

The Evening Star. “Museum’s Got the Button.” In: The Evening Star, Washington D.C. (February 6, 1936): B-11.

The Evening Star. “Warrington Re-elected Aero Club President.” In: The Evening Star, Washington D.C. (January 13, 1937): B-16.

The Evening Star. “College Park Aviation Meets Thrills Crowd; ‘Chute Jumper Hurt.” In: The Evening Star, Washington D.C. (May 8, 1939): A-2.

The Evening Star. “D.C. Women in Uniform.” In: The Evening Star, Washington D.C. (January 20, 1944): B-2.

Tracy, Richard L. “Mary Foley Benson: Her wildflower paintings are ‘expressions of gratitude.’” In: The Sacramento Bee, California Life (August 20, 1977): CL-10-11.

Tunić, Srđan. "Plants, Insects and Art: Mary Foley Benson's Scientific Illustrations." In: Bohart Museum Society, Winter 2023, Newsletter No. 93 (January 2023): 5.

Wellings, Marjorie. “Davis has lost an artist and a true free spirit.” In: The Davis Enterprise (June 23, 1992): A-8.
