= 1991–92 Southwest Missouri State Lady Bears basketball team =

Women's college basketball season

1991–92 Southwest Missouri State Lady Bears basketball

Gateway regular season and tournament champions

NCAA tournament, Final Four
- Conference: Gateway Collegiate Athletic Conference

Ranking
- Coaches: No. 4
- AP: No. 10
- Record: 31–3 (17–1 GCAC)
- Head coach: Cheryl Burnett (5th season)
- Assistant coaches: Marla Douglass; Jim Middleton; Lynette Robinson
- Home arena: Hammons Student Center

1991–92 Gateway Collegiate Athletic Conference women's basketball standings
	Conf.				Overall
Team	W		L	PCT	W		L	PCT
No. 10 SW Missouri State †	17	–	1	.944	31	–	3	.912
Southern Illinois	14	–	4	.778	23	–	8	.742
Bradley	11	–	7	.611	17	–	11	.607
Illinois State	11	–	7	.611	14	–	14	.500
Wichita State	10	–	8	.556	13	–	16	.448
Drake	7	–	11	.389	11	–	15	.423
Indiana State	7	–	11	.389	10	–	17	.370
Western Illinois	5	–	13	.278	9	–	18	.333
Eastern Illinois	4	–	14	.222	8	–	19	.296
Northern Iowa	3	–	15	.167	4	–	23	.148
† 1992 GCAC tournament winner Rankings from AP Poll

The 1991–92 Southwest Missouri State Lady Bears basketball team represented Southwest Missouri State University during the 1991–92 NCAA Division I women's basketball season. The Lady Bears, led by fifth-year head coach Cheryl Burnett, played their home games at Hammons Student Center and were members of the Gateway Collegiate Athletic Conference.

They finished the season 31–3 and 17–1 in conference play to win the regular season title. As the top seed in the conference tournament, they defeated Bradley in the semifinals of Southern Illinois in the championship game. They received an automatic bid to the NCAA tournament and, despite being the No. 10 ranked team in the country, were assigned the No. 8 seed in the Midwest region. They defeated No. 9 seed Kansas, No. 1 seed Iowa, No. 5 seed UCLA, and No. 2 seed Ole Miss to reach the first Final Four in program history. The Lady Bears were defeated by Western Kentucky in the National semifinals.

As part of their 21-game winning streak (part of 31 wins in a 32-game span), Southwest Missouri State spent the final thirteen weeks of the season ranked in both major polls. The team was ranked in the top 10 for the final month, and had a final ranking in the Coach's poll of No. 4.

== Roster ==
1991–92 Missouri State Bears women's basketball team
Players
Coaches

Pos.	#	Name	Height	Year	Previous school	Hometown
G	10	Amy Nelson (C)	5 ft 6 in (1.68 m)	Sr	Edwardsville	Edwardsville, Illinois
G/F	15	Charity Shira	5 ft 9 in (1.75 m)	Sr	Fair Grove; Rice	Fair Grove, Missouri
F	22	Karen Rapier (C)	6 ft 0 in (1.83 m)	Sr	Jefferson City	Jefferson City, Missouri
G/F	23	Secelia Winkfield	5 ft 8 in (1.73 m)	Jr	Blue Springs	Blue Springs, Missouri
G	30	Tina Robbins	5 ft 8 in (1.73 m)	So	Joplin	Duenweg, Missouri
F	32	Julie Howard	5 ft 10 in (1.78 m)	Fr	Marshfield	Marshfield, Missouri
C	34	Heidi Muller	6 ft 5 in (1.96 m)	Sr	Clarinda	Clarinda, Iowa
G	35	Melody Howard	5 ft 9 in (1.75 m)	So	Marshfield	Marshfield, Missouri
F/C		Tonya Baucom	6 ft 0 in (1.83 m)	Jr	Pleasanton	Pleasanton, Kansas
F		Angenette Sumrall	5 ft 10 in (1.78 m)	Fr	Lincoln	East St. Louis, Illinois
C	54	Chrissy Ediger	6 ft 1 in (1.85 m)	Fr	Aurora	Aurora, Missouri

Head coach

- Cheryl Burnett (Kansas)

Assistant coach(es)

- Marla Douglass
- Jim Middleton
- Lynette Robinson

Legend

- (C) Team captain
- (S) Suspended
- (I) Ineligible
- (W) Walk-on
- Injured
- Current redshirt

Roster

== Schedule ==
Date time, TV	Rank^{#}	Opponent^{#}	Result	Record	Site (attendance) city, state
Exhibition
November 11, 1991*		German National	W 78–68	–	Hammons Student Center; Springfield, Missouri
November 15, 1991*		Athletes in Action	L 75–82	–	Hammons Student Center; Springfield, Missouri
Non-conference regular season
November 23, 1991*		at No. 12 Texas	L 64–76	0–1	Frank Erwin Center; Austin, Texas
November 29, 1991*		Idaho State; St. John’s/Quality Inn Classic	W 92–45	1–1	Hammons Student Center; Springfield, Missouri
November 30, 1991*		Texas A&M; St. John’s/Quality Inn Classic	W 83–78	2–1	Hammons Student Center; Springfield, Missouri
December 3, 1991*		Iowa State	W 77–43	3–1	Hammons Student Center; Springfield, Missouri
December 11, 1991*		at Kansas State	W 66–49	4–1	Bramlage Coliseum; Manhattan, Kansas
December 13, 1991*		Idaho	W 97–46	5–1	Hammons Student Center; Springfield, Missouri
December 20, 1991*	No. 25	at UNLV; UNLV Showboat Shootout	W 80–77	6–1	Thomas & Mack Center; Las Vegas, Nevada
December 21, 1991*	No. 25	vs. Pepperdine; UNLV Showboat Shootout	W 75–58	7–1	Thomas & Mack Center; Las Vegas, Nevada
December 30, 1991*	No. 24	at No. 25 Arkansas	W 67–52	8–1	Barnhill Arena; Fayetteville, Arkansas
Conference regular season
January 2, 1992	No. 24	Eastern Illinois	W 80–32	9–1 (1–0)	Hammons Student Center; Springfield, Missouri
January 4, 1992	No. 24	Southern Illinois	W 90–63	10–1 (2–0)	Hammons Student Center (9,108); Springfield, Missouri
January 9, 1992	No. 20	at Illinois State	L 73–79	10–2 (2–1)	Redbird Arena; Normal, Illinois
January 11, 1992	No. 20	at Indiana State	W 77–53	11–2 (3–1)	Hulman Center; Terre Haute, Indiana
January 15, 1992	No. 23	Bradley	W 65–33	12–2 (4–1)	Hammons Student Center; Springfield, Missouri
January 18, 1992	No. 23	Western Illinois	W 97–74	13–2 (5–1)	Hammons Student Center; Springfield, Missouri
January 25, 1992	No. 19	Wichita State	W 98–64	14–2 (6–1)	Hammons Student Center; Springfield, Missouri
January 30, 1992	No. 18	at Drake	W 64–60	15–2 (7–1)	Veterans Memorial Auditorium; Des Moines, Iowa
February 1, 1992	No. 18	at Northern Iowa	W 89–44	16–2 (8–1)	UNI-Dome; Cedar Falls, Iowa
February 6, 1992	No. 16	Indiana State	W 91–57	17–2 (9–1)	Hammons Student Center; Springfield, Missouri
February 8, 1992	No. 16	Illinois State	W 67–47	18–2 (10–1)	Hammons Student Center; Springfield, Missouri
February 13, 1992	No. 12	at Western Illinois	W 109–45	19–2 (11–1)	Western Hall; Macomb, Illinois
February 15, 1992	No. 12	at Bradley	W 92–63	20–2 (12–1)	Robertson Memorial Field House; Peoria, Illinois
February 22, 1992	No. 12	Wichita State	W 84–53	21–2 (13–1)	Hammons Student Center; Springfield, Missouri
February 27, 1992	No. 10	Northern Iowa	W 86–45	22–2 (14–1)	Hammons Student Center; Springfield, Missouri
February 29, 1992	No. 10	Drake	W 77–60	23–2 (15–1)	Hammons Student Center; Springfield, Missouri
March 5, 1992	No. 10	at Southern Illinois	W 73–63	24–2 (16–1)	SIU Arena; Carbondale, Illinois
March 7, 1992	No. 10	at Eastern Illinois	W 73–61	25–2 (17–1)	Lantz Arena; Charleston, Illinois
GCAC tournament
March 11, 1992*	(1) No. 10	(4) Bradley; Semifinal	W 88–59	26–2	Hammons Student Center; Springfield, Missouri
March 14, 1992*	(1) No. 10	(2) Southern Illinois; Championship game	W 86–69	27–2	Hammons Student Center; Springfield, Missouri
NCAA tournament
March 18, 1992*	(8 MW) No. 10	(9 NW) No. 17 Kansas; First round	W 75–59	28–2	Hammons Student Center (7,652); Springfield, Missouri
Mar 22, 1992*	(8 MW) No. 10	at (1 MW) No. 7 Iowa; Second round	W 61–60 ^{OT}	29–2	Carver-Hawkeye Arena (8,693); Iowa City, Iowa
Mar 26, 1992*	(8 MW) No. 10	vs. (5 MW) UCLA; Regional Semifinal – Elite Eight	W 83–57	30–2	Coors Events/Conference Center (3,532); Boulder, Colorado
Mar 28, 1992*	(8 MW) No. 10	vs. (2 MW) No. 5 Ole Miss; Regional final – Elite Eight	W 94–71	31–2	Coors Events/Conference Center (3,566); Boulder, Colorado
April 4, 1992*	(8 MW) No. 10	vs. (4 ME) No. 15 Western Kentucky; National semifinal – Final Four	L 72–84	31–3	Los Angeles Memorial Sports Arena (12,421); Los Angeles California
*Non-conference game. ^{#}Rankings from AP Poll. (#) Tournament seedings in parentheses. MW=Midwest. All times are in Central Time.
