= 1991–92 NCAA Division I women's basketball rankings =

- Season: 1991–92
- NCAA Tournament: 1992
- Preseason No. 1: Tennessee
- NCAA Tournament Champions: Stanford
NCAA Division I women's basketball rankings
| |

Two human polls comprise the 1991–92 NCAA Division I women's basketball rankings, the AP Poll and the Coaches Poll, in addition to various publications' preseason polls. The AP poll is currently a poll of sportswriters, while the USA Today Coaches' Poll is a poll of college coaches. The AP conducts polls weekly through the end of the regular season and conference play, while the Coaches poll conducts a final, post-NCAA tournament poll as well.

== Legend ==
| – | No votes |
| (#) | Ranking |

== AP Poll ==
| Team | 17-Nov | 24-Nov | 1-Dec | 8-Dec | 15-Dec | 22-Dec | 29-Dec | 5-Jan | 12-Jan | 19-Jan | 26-Jan | 2-Feb | 9-Feb | 16-Feb | 23-Feb | 1-Mar | 8-Mar | 15-Mar |
|---|---|---|---|---|---|---|---|---|---|---|---|---|---|---|---|---|---|---|
| Virginia | 2 | 2 | 2 | 2 | 1 | 1 | 1 | 1 | 1 | 2 | 2 | 2 | 2 | 1 | 1 | 1 | 1 | 1 |
| Tennessee | 1 | 1 | 1 | 1 | 3 | 3 | 3 | 3 | 2 | 4 | 4 | 4 | 3 | 2 | 2 | 2 | 2 | 2 |
| Stanford | 7 | 5 | 3 | 3 | 2 | 2 | 2 | 2 | 4 | 3 | 3 | 3 | 6 | 6 | 5 | 6 | 3 | 3 |
| Stephen F. Austin | 14 | 9 | 8 | 6 | 6 | 9 | 9 | 8 | 7 | 7 | 6 | 6 | 4 | 3 | 7 | 5 | 4 | 4 |
| Ole Miss | 23 | 23 | – | – | 25 | 16 | 15 | 14 | 10 | 8 | 7 | 7 | 5 | 5 | 4 | 3 | 5 | 5 |
| Miami (FL) | – | – | – | – | – | T25 | – | 25 | 19 | 14 | 12 | 9 | 8 | 8 | 8 | 7 | 6 | 6 |
| Iowa | 9 | 7 | 6 | 5 | 5 | 5 | 8 | 5 | 5 | 5 | 5 | 5 | 7 | 7 | 6 | 8 | 7 | 7 |
| Maryland | 15 | 12 | 9 | 7 | 7 | 6 | 5 | 4 | 3 | 1 | 1 | 1 | 1 | 4 | 3 | 4 | 8 | 8 |
| Penn St. | 3 | 3 | 7 | 10 | 9 | 7 | 6 | 9 | 8 | 9 | 8 | 11 | 11 | 11 | 9 | 9 | 9 | 9 |
| Missouri St. | – | – | – | – | – | T25 | 24 | 20 | 23 | 19 | 18 | 16 | 12 | 12 | 10 | 10 | 10 | 10 |
| Purdue | 10 | 17 | 11 | 11 | 10 | 12 | 10 | 10 | 12 | 12 | 10 | 10 | 9 | 9 | 14 | 13 | 12 | 11 |
| Texas Tech | – | – | – | – | – | – | – | – | – | T25 | 19 | 20 | 17 | 20 | 18 | 15 | 14 | 12 |
| Vanderbilt | 8 | 6 | 5 | 4 | 4 | 4 | 4 | 7 | 13 | 13 | 11 | 13 | 10 | 10 | 11 | 12 | 15 | 13 |
| West Virginia | – | – | – | – | – | – | – | – | – | – | 25 | 23 | 19 | 15 | 13 | 11 | 11 | 14 |
| Western Ky. | 5 | 4 | 4 | 8 | 13 | 11 | 22 | 24 | 21 | 16 | 14 | 12 | 15 | 17 | 16 | 19 | 16 | 15 |
| George Washington | 25 | – | 16 | 12 | 11 | 8 | 7 | 6 | 6 | 6 | 9 | 8 | 14 | 14 | 15 | 16 | 17 | 16 |
| Kansas | – | – | – | 25 | 24 | 19 | 17 | 19 | 24 | 22 | 20 | 17 | 16 | 18 | 17 | 14 | 13 | 17 |
| Alabama | – | – | – | – | – | – | – | – | – | – | 24 | 22 | 21 | 22 | 20 | 17 | 18 | 18 |
| Texas | 12 | 10 | 13 | 18 | 19 | 22 | 20 | 21 | – | – | – | – | – | 25 | 24 | 22 | 22 | 19 |
| Clemson | 20 | 22 | 20 | 19 | 18 | 14 | 12 | 15 | 17 | 15 | 15 | 18 | 23 | 19 | 19 | 18 | 20 | 20 |
| Creighton | – | – | – | – | – | – | – | – | – | – | – | – | – | – | – | T25 | 23 | 21 |
| Houston | – | – | 23 | 17 | 16 | 17 | 16 | 16 | 11 | 11 | 16 | 14 | 20 | 21 | 21 | 21 | 19 | 22 |
| Southern California | 19 | 20 | 18 | 23 | – | – | – | – | – | – | – | – | – | – | – | – | – | 23 |
| Colorado | – | – | – | – | – | – | – | – | – | – | – | – | – | – | – | – | – | 24 |
| Arizona St. | – | – | – | – | – | – | – | – | – | – | – | – | – | – | – | T25 | – | – |
| Arkansas | 11 | 18 | 14 | 20 | 20 | 24 | T25 | – | – | – | – | – | – | – | – | – | – | – |
| Auburn | 6 | 11 | 15 | 16 | 17 | 20 | 18 | 17 | 20 | – | – | – | – | – | – | – | – | – |
| California | – | – | – | – | – | – | – | – | – | 21 | 21 | 24 | 22 | – | – | – | – | – |
| Georgia | 4 | 8 | 24 | – | – | – | – | – | 25 | – | – | – | – | – | – | – | 24 | – |
| Hawaii | – | – | – | – | – | 23 | 21 | 18 | 15 | 17 | 17 | 15 | 13 | 13 | 12 | 20 | 21 | – |
| Lamar | 16 | 14 | 25 | – | – | – | – | – | – | – | – | – | – | – | – | – | – | – |
| Long Beach St. | – | – | – | – | – | T25 | T25 | – | – | 24 | – | 25 | – | – | – | – | – | – |
| Louisiana Tech | 21 | 24 | – | – | – | – | – | – | – | – | – | – | – | – | – | – | – | – |
| LSU | 18 | 19 | 12 | 14 | 12 | 21 | 23 | 22 | 18 | 23 | – | – | – | – | – | – | – | – |
| North Carolina | – | – | – | – | – | – | – | – | – | T25 | 23 | 21 | 24 | 23 | 25 | 24 | – | – |
| North Carolina St. | 13 | 13 | 10 | 9 | 8 | 10 | 13 | 12 | 16 | 20 | – | – | – | – | – | – | – | – |
| Northwestern | – | 16 | 17 | 13 | 15 | 13 | 11 | 11 | 14 | 18 | 22 | – | – | – | – | – | – | – |
| Ohio St. | – | – | 22 | 22 | 23 | – | – | – | – | – | – | – | – | – | – | – | – | – |
| Oregon | – | – | – | 24 | 22 | – | – | – | – | – | – | – | – | – | – | – | – | – |
| UConn | 17 | 15 | 19 | 21 | 21 | 18 | 19 | 23 | 22 | – | – | – | – | – | – | – | – | – |
| UNLV | 24 | 25 | – | – | – | – | – | – | – | – | – | – | – | – | – | – | – | – |
| Washington | 22 | 21 | 21 | 15 | 14 | 15 | 14 | 13 | 9 | 10 | 13 | 19 | 18 | 16 | 23 | – | – | – |
| Wisconsin | – | – | – | – | – | – | – | – | – | – | – | – | 25 | 24 | 22 | 23 | 25 | – |
| UC Santa Barbara | – | – | – | – | – | – | – | – | – | – | – | – | – | – | – | – | – | T25 |
| Vermont | – | – | – | – | – | – | – | – | – | – | – | – | – | – | – | T25 | – | T25 |

== USA Today Coaches poll ==
| Team | 19-Nov | 3-Dec | 10-Dec | 17-Dec | 24-Dec | 31-Dec | 7-Jan | 14-Jan | 21-Jan | 28-Jan | 4-Feb | 11-Feb | 18-Feb | 25-Feb | 3-Mar | 10-Mar | 17-Mar | 6-Apr |
|---|---|---|---|---|---|---|---|---|---|---|---|---|---|---|---|---|---|---|
| Stanford | 7 | 3 | 3 | 2 | 2 | 2 | 2 | 3 | 3 | 3 | 3 | 4 | 6 | 4 | 4 | 4 | 3 | 1 |
| Virginia | 2 | 2 | 2 | 1 | 1 | 1 | 1 | 1 | 2 | 2 | 2 | 2 | 1 | 1 | 1 | 1 | 1 | 2 |
| Western Ky. | 6 | 4 | 8 | 13 | 12 | 23 | – | 24 | 16 | 15 | 12 | 13 | 16 | 16 | 19 | 19 | 15 | 3 |
| Missouri St. | – | – | – | – | – | 25 | 20 | 22 | 17 | 17 | 16 | 12 | 12 | 10 | 10 | 10 | 10 | 4 |
| Tennessee | 1 | 1 | 1 | 3 | 3 | 3 | 3 | 2 | 4 | 4 | 4 | 3 | 2 | 2 | 2 | 2 | 2 | 5 |
| Ole Miss | 21 | T24 | – | – | 17 | 15 | 13 | 9 | 6 | 7 | 6 | 5 | 3 | 3 | 3 | 3 | 4 | 6 |
| Vanderbilt | 9 | 6 | 4 | 4 | 4 | 4 | 6 | 11 | 12 | 11 | 13 | 10 | 10 | 11 | 13 | 13 | 13 | 7 |
| Maryland | 22 | 9 | 7 | 6 | 6 | 5 | 4 | 4 | 1 | 1 | 1 | 1 | 5 | 5 | 5 | 5 | 8 | 8 |
| Miami (FL) | – | – | – | – | – | – | 25 | 20 | 14 | 12 | 9 | 9 | 8 | 8 | T7 | T7 | 7 | 9 |
| Iowa | 8 | 5 | 5 | 5 | 5 | 8 | 5 | 5 | 5 | 5 | 5 | 7 | 7 | 6 | T7 | T7 | 6 | 10 |
| West Virginia | – | – | – | – | – | – | – | – | – | – | 24 | 18 | 15 | 12 | 11 | 11 | 14 | 11 |
| Southern California | 15 | 19 | 23 | 25 | – | – | – | – | – | – | – | – | – | – | 24 | 24 | 21 | 12 |
| Stephen F. Austin | 20 | 8 | 6 | 7 | 10 | 9 | 8 | 6 | 7 | 6 | 7 | 6 | 4 | 7 | 6 | 6 | 5 | 13 |
| Penn St. | 3 | 7 | 11 | 10 | 7 | 6 | 10 | 8 | 9 | 8 | 10 | 11 | 11 | 9 | 9 | 9 | 9 | 14 |
| Texas Tech | – | – | – | – | – | – | – | – | – | 19 | 18 | 17 | 20 | 19 | 16 | 16 | 12 | 15 |
| Purdue | 10 | 11 | 10 | 9 | 11 | 10 | 9 | 13 | 13 | 9 | 11 | 8 | 9 | 15 | 12 | 12 | 11 | 16 |
| Alabama | – | – | – | – | – | – | – | – | 24 | 22 | 21 | 19 | 21 | 20 | 17 | 17 | 18 | 17 |
| UCLA | – | – | – | – | – | – | – | – | – | – | – | – | – | – | – | – | – | 18 |
| Clemson | 19 | 16 | 17 | 16 | 13 | 11 | 15 | 17 | 15 | 16 | 19 | 23 | 19 | 18 | 20 | 20 | 19 | 19 |
| George Washington | – | 20 | 13 | 11 | 8 | 7 | 7 | 7 | 8 | 10 | 8 | 16 | 14 | 14 | 15 | 15 | 16 | 20 |
| UC Santa Barbara | – | – | – | – | – | – | – | – | – | – | – | – | – | – | – | – | – | 21 |
| Vermont | – | – | – | – | – | – | – | – | – | – | – | 25 | 25 | 25 | 23 | 23 | 23 | 22 |
| Texas | 12 | T13 | 20 | 19 | 22 | 20 | 21 | – | – | – | – | – | – | 24 | 25 | 25 | 20 | 23 |
| Creighton | – | – | – | – | – | – | – | – | – | – | – | – | – | – | – | – | 24 | 24 |
| Kansas | – | – | 25 | 22 | 18 | 17 | 18 | 19 | 20 | 20 | 17 | 14 | 17 | 17 | 14 | 14 | 17 | 25 |
| Arkansas | 11 | 15 | 21 | 20 | 25 | 24 | – | – | – | – | – | – | – | – | – | – | – | – |
| Auburn | 5 | T13 | 16 | 17 | 20 | 18 | 17 | 21 | – | – | – | – | – | – | – | – | – | – |
| California | – | – | – | – | – | – | – | – | 23 | 21 | 23 | 22 | – | – | – | – | – | – |
| Colorado | – | – | – | – | – | – | – | – | – | – | – | – | – | – | – | – | 25 | – |
| Georgia | 4 | 23 | – | – | – | – | 24 | 25 | – | – | – | – | – | – | – | – | – | – |
| Hawaii | – | – | – | – | 23 | 21 | 19 | 14 | 18 | 18 | 15 | 15 | 13 | 13 | 18 | 18 | – | – |
| Houston | – | – | 18 | 15 | 16 | 16 | 16 | 12 | 11 | 14 | 14 | 20 | 22 | 22 | 22 | 22 | 22 | – |
| Lamar | 17 | 22 | – | – | – | – | – | – | – | – | – | – | – | – | – | – | – | – |
| Long Beach St. | – | – | – | – | – | – | – | – | – | – | 25 | – | – | – | – | – | – | – |
| Louisiana Tech | 23 | – | – | – | – | – | – | – | – | – | – | – | – | – | – | – | – | – |
| LSU | 13 | 12 | 12 | 12 | 21 | 22 | 22 | 18 | 22 | – | – | – | – | – | – | – | – | – |
| North Carolina | – | – | – | – | – | – | – | – | 25 | 23 | 20 | 24 | 24 | – | – | – | – | – |
| North Carolina St. | 16 | 10 | 9 | 8 | 9 | 12 | 11 | 15 | 21 | 25 | – | – | – | – | – | – | – | – |
| Northwestern | 25 | T17 | 14 | 18 | 14 | 13 | 14 | 16 | 19 | 24 | – | – | – | – | – | – | – | – |
| Ohio St. | – | T24 | 22 | 24 | – | – | – | – | – | – | – | – | – | – | – | – | – | – |
| Oregon | – | – | 24 | 21 | 24 | – | – | – | – | – | – | – | – | – | – | – | – | – |
| UConn | 14 | T17 | 19 | 23 | 19 | 19 | 23 | 23 | – | – | – | – | – | – | – | – | – | – |
| UNLV | 24 | – | – | – | – | – | – | – | – | – | – | – | – | – | – | – | – | – |
| Washington | 18 | 21 | 15 | 14 | 15 | 14 | 12 | 10 | 10 | 13 | 22 | 21 | 18 | 23 | – | – | – | – |
| Wisconsin | – | – | – | – | – | – | – | – | – | – | – | – | 23 | 21 | 21 | 21 | – | – |
