= 1991–92 Virginia Cavaliers women's basketball team =

Intercollegiate basketball season

1991–92 Virginia Cavaliers women's basketball

ACC regular season and tournament champions

NCAA tournament, Final Four
- Conference: Atlantic Coast Conference

Ranking
- Coaches: No. 2
- AP: No. 1
- Record: 32–2 (15–1 ACC)
- Head coach: Debbie Ryan (15th season)
- Assistant coaches: Frank DiLeo; Shawn Campbell; Melissa Wiggins
- Home arena: University Hall

1991–92 ACC women's basketball standings
	Conf.				Overall
Team	W		L	PCT	W		L	PCT
No. 1 Virginia †	15	–	1	.938	32	–	2	.941
No. 8 Maryland	13	–	3	.813	25	–	6	.806
North Carolina	9	–	7	.563	22	–	9	.710
No. 20 Clemson	9	–	7	.563	21	–	10	.677
Florida State	8	–	8	.500	17	–	11	.607
NC State	7	–	9	.438	16	–	12	.571
Georgia Tech	6	–	10	.375	20	–	13	.606
Duke	4	–	12	.250	14	–	15	.483
Wake Forest	1	–	15	.063	10	–	18	.357
† 1991 ACC tournament winner Rankings from AP poll

The 1991–92 Virginia Cavaliers women's basketball team represented the University of Virginia during the 1991–92 NCAA Division I women's basketball season. The Cavaliers were led by 15th-year head coach Debbie Ryan, and played their home games at University Hall in Charlottesville, Virginia as members the Atlantic Coast Conference.

This season resulted in Virginia's third straight Final Four appearance. After a heartbreaking loss in overtime in the 1991 National championship game, the Lady Cavs fell painfully close again by losing to Stanford in the National semifinals by a single point, 66–65, after owning a 7-point lead with under eight minutes remaining.

Then senior Dawn Staley was selected as the National Player of the Year.

== Roster ==
1991–92 Virginia Cavaliers women's basketball team
Players
Coaches

Pos.	#	Name	Height	Year	Previous school	Hometown
G	10	Dena Evans	5 ft 5 in (1.65 m)	Jr		Deer Park, TX
F/C	21	Melanee Wagener	6 ft 2 in (1.88 m)	Sr		Mount Airy, MD
G	22	Chris Lesoravage	6 ft 0 in (1.83 m)	Fr		Doylestown, PA
G	24	Dawn Staley (C)	5 ft 6 in (1.68 m)	Sr	Dobbins Tech	Philadelphia, PA
C	30	Heather Burge	6 ft 5 in (1.96 m)	Jr	Palos Verdes	Palos Verdes Estates, CA
G	32	Tammi Reiss	5 ft 6 in (1.68 m)	Sr	Eldred Central School	Eldred, NY
F	33	Wendy Toussaint	5 ft 11 in (1.8 m)	So		Irvington, NJ
C	34	Heidi Burge	6 ft 5 in (1.96 m)	Jr	Palos Verdes	Palos Verdes Estates, CA
F/C	40	Amy Lofstedt	6 ft 1 in (1.85 m)	Fr		Ankeny, IA
F	42	Charleata Beale	6 ft 0 in (1.83 m)	Fr		Dale City, VA
F	44	Allison Moore	6 ft 1 in (1.85 m)	Jr		Virginia Beach, VA
F	52	Felicia Santelli	6 ft 0 in (1.83 m)	Sr		Scarsdale, NY
F/C	54	Audra Smith	6 ft 2 in (1.88 m)	Sr		Milledgeville, GA

Head coach

- Debbie Ryan (Ursinus)

Assistant coach(es)

Legend

- (C) Team captain
- (S) Suspended
- (I) Ineligible
- (W) Walk-on
- Injured
- Current redshirt

Roster

== Schedule ==
Date time, TV	Rank^{#}	Opponent^{#}	Result	Record	Site (attendance) city, state
Regular season
Nov 22, 1991*	No. 2	Fairfield	W 110–64	1–0	University Hall; Charlottesville, Virginia
Jan 15, 1992	No. 1	No. 3 Maryland	L 65–67	13–1 (3–1)	University Hall; Charlottesville, Virginia
Feb 11, 1992	No. 2	at No. 1 Maryland	W 75–74	21–1 (11–1)	Cole Fieldhouse; College Park, Maryland
Feb 15, 1992	No. 2	Duke	W 93–48	22–1 (12–1)	University Hall; Charlottesville, Virginia
Feb 17, 1992*	No. 1	Connecticut	W 64–43	23–1	University Hall; Charlottesville, Virginia
Feb 22, 1992	No. 1	at No. 19 Clemson	W 85–81	24–1 (13–1)	Littlejohn Coliseum; Clemson, South Carolina
Feb 26, 1992	No. 1	North Carolina	W 65–52	25–1 (14–1)	University Hall; Charlottesville, Virginia
Feb 29, 1992	No. 1	at NC State	W 76–74	26–1 (15–1)	Reynolds Coliseum; Raleigh, North Carolina
ACC tournament
March 7, 1992*	No. 1	vs. Duke; Quarterfinals	W 81–55	27–1	Winthrop Coliseum; Rock Hill, South Carolina
March 8, 1992*	No. 1	vs. North Carolina; Semifinals	W 74–55	28–1	Winthrop Coliseum; Rock Hill, South Carolina
March 9, 1992*	No. 1	vs. Georgia Tech; Championship game	W 70–69	29–1	Winthrop Coliseum; Rock Hill, South Carolina
NCAA tournament
March 22, 1992*	(1 E) No. 1	vs. (8 E) No. 14 George Washington; Second round	W 97–58	30–1	University Hall; Charlottesville, Virginia
March 26, 1992*	(1 E) No. 1	vs. (4 E) No. 14 West Virginia; Regional Semifinal – Sweet Sixteen	W 103–83	31–1	University Hall; Charlottesville, Virginia
March 28, 1992*	(1 E) No. 1	vs. (3 E) No. 13 Vanderbilt; Regional Final – Elite Eight	W 70–58	32–1	University Hall; Charlottesville, Virginia
April 4, 1992*	(1 E) No. 1	vs. (1 W) No. 3 Stanford; National Semifinal – Final Four	L 65–66	32–2	L.A. Sports Arena; Los Angeles, California
*Non-conference game. ^{#}Rankings from AP Poll. (#) Tournament seedings in parentheses. All times are in Eastern.

== Rankings ==
Ranking movements Legend: ██ Increase in ranking ██ Decrease in ranking
	Week																	
Poll	Pre	1	2	3	4	5	6	7	8	9	10	11	12	13	14	15	16	Final
AP	2	2	2	2	1	1	1	1	1	2	2	2	2	1	1	1	1	Not released
Coaches	2	2	2	1	1	1	1	1	2	2	2	2	1	1	1	1	1	2

== Awards and honors ==
- Dawn Staley – ACC Player of the Year, Naismith College Player of the Year, USBWA Player of the Year, WBCA Player of the Year, Honda Sports Award
