= 1991–92 Stanford Cardinal women's basketball team =

Intercollegiate basketball season

1991–92 Stanford Cardinal women's basketball

NCAA tournament National champions Pac–10 regular season champions
- Conference: Pacific-10 Conference

Ranking
- Coaches: No. 1
- AP: No. 3
- Record: 30–3 (16–2 Pac-10)
- Head coach: Tara VanDerveer (7th season)
- Assistant coaches: Amy Tucker; Reneé Brown

1991–92 Pacific-10 Conference women's basketball standings
	Conf.				Overall
Team	W		L	PCT	W		L	PCT
No. 3 Stanford	15	–	3	.833	30	–	3	.909
No. 23 USC	14	–	4	.778	23	–	8	.742
California	12	–	6	.667	20	–	9	.690
UCLA	12	–	6	.667	21	–	10	.677
Arizona State	11	–	7	.611	20	–	9	.690
Washington	9	–	9	.500	17	–	11	.607
Oregon	6	–	12	.333	14	–	14	.500
Washington State	5	–	13	.278	12	–	15	.444
Arizona	3	–	15	.167	9	–	19	.321
Oregon State	3	–	15	.167	8	–	20	.286
As of April 6, 1992; Rankings from AP Poll

The 1991–92 Stanford Cardinal women's basketball team represented Stanford University in the 1991–92 NCAA Division I women's basketball season. The Cardinal were coached by Tara VanDerveer who was in her seventh year. The Cardinal were members of the Pacific-10 Conference. They won their second NCAA Championship in a three-year span.

== Roster ==
1991–92 Stanford Cardinal women's basketball team
Players
Coaches

Pos.	#	Name	Height	Year	Hometown
G	3	Kate Paye	5 ft 8 in (1.73 m)	Fr	Woodside, California
G	15	Molly Goodenbour	5 ft 6 in (1.68 m)	Jr	Waterloo, Iowa
G	22	Angela Taylor	5 ft 6 in (1.68 m)	Jr	Mountain Home, Idaho
C	52	Val Whiting	6 ft 3 in (1.91 m)	Jr	Wilmington, Delaware

Head coach

- Tara VanDerveer

Assistant coach(es)

Legend

- (C) Team captain
- (S) Suspended
- (I) Ineligible
- (W) Walk-on
- Injured
- Current redshirt

== Schedule ==
Date time, TV	Rank^{#}	Opponent^{#}	Result	Record	Site (attendance) city, state
Regular season
NCAA women's tournament
March 21, 1992*	(1 W) No. 3	vs. (9 W) UC Santa Barbara; Second round	W 82–73	26–3	Maples Pavilion; Palo Alto, California
March 26, 1992*	(1 W) No. 3	vs. (4 W) No. 12 Texas Tech; Regional Semifinal – Sweet Sixteen	W 75–63	27–3	Hec Edmundson Pavilion; Seattle, Washington
March 28, 1992*	(1 W) No. 3	vs. (3 W) No. 23 USC; Regional Final – Elite Eight	W 82–62	28–3	Hec Edmundson Pavilion; Seattle, Washington
April 4, 1992*	(1 W) No. 3	vs. (1 E) No. 1 Virginia; National Semifinal – Final Four	W 66–65	29–3	Los Angeles Memorial Sports Arena; Los Angeles, California
April 5, 1992*	(1 W) No. 3	vs. (4 ME) No. 15 Western Kentucky; National Championship	W 78–62	30–3	Los Angeles Memorial Sports Arena; Los Angeles, California
*Non-conference game. ^{#}Rankings from AP Poll. (#) Tournament seedings in parentheses. W=Stanford, CA regional. All times are in Pacific Time.
