= Centralia High School (Missouri) =

Location
- 849 S Jefferson St; Centralia, Missouri; United States; 39°12′2.13″N 92°8′8.34″W

Information
- Type: Public Secondary/High school
- School district: Centralia R-6
- Director: Nathan Gordon
- Teaching staff: 30.05 (on an FTE basis)
- Grades: 9-12
- Enrollment: 409 (2023–2024)
- Student to teacher ratio: 13.61
- Colors: Black and white
- Team name: Panthers
- Website: www.cr6.org

Centralia High School is a public secondary school in Centralia, Missouri. It is operated by the Centralia R-6 School District.

== Notable alumni ==
- Cheryl Burnett
