= Lee Buchanan (basketball) =

American college basketball coach

Biographical details
- Born: March 9, 1961 (age 65)

Coaching career (HC unless noted)
- 1986–1998: Brescia
- 1998–2002: Francis Marion
- 2002–2003: Southern Mississippi (asst.)
- 2003–2007: UMSL
- 2007–2012: Eastern Illinois (asst.)
- 2012–2013: Eastern Illinois
- 2013–2020: LaGrange

Head coaching record
- Overall: 473–307 (.606)

Lee Buchanan (born March 9, 1961) is an American college basketball coach.

== Career ==
He is the former women's head coach at Eastern Illinois University in Charleston, Illinois. After leading his team to the Eastern Division title of the Ohio Valley Conference and an invitation to play in the WNIT in his first season at EIU, on April 15, 2013, Buchanan suddenly announced his resignation to "pursue other professional opportunities" and to spend more time with his family.

On August 21, 2023, Buchanan was hired as the new women's basketball head coach at LaGrange College, a position he held until the end of the 2019–20 season.

== Head coaching record ==
Record table
Season	Team	Overall	Conference	Standing	Postseason
Brescia (Kentucky Intercollegiate Athletic Conference) (1986–1998)
1986–87	Bresica	8–17			
1987–88	Bresica	1–20			
1988–89	Bresica	24–5			
1989–90	Bresica	24–7			
1990–91	Bresica	16–12			
1991–92	Bresica	15–12			
1992–93	Bresica	21–8			
1993–94	Bresica	20–10			
1994–95	Bresica	23–8			
1995–96	Bresica	27–4			
1996–97	Bresica	30–6			
1997–98	Bresica	21–9			
Brescia:		226–102 (.689)	???		
Francis Marion (Peach Belt Conference) (1998–2002)
1998–99	Francis Marion	27–3	16–0	1st North	1–1 (PBC); 1–1 (NCAA DII)
1999–2000	Francis Marion	25–8	13–3	1st North	1–1 (PBC); 2–1 (NCAA DII Sweet 16)
2000–01	Francis Marion	24–7	13–3	2nd North	1–1 (PBC); 2–1 (NCAA DII Sweet 16)
2001–02	Francis Marion	16–11	12–7	2nd (Tie) North	(0–1) (PBC)
Francis Marion:		92–29 (.760)	54–13 (.806)		
UMSL Tritons (Great Lakes Valley Conference) (2003–2007)
2003–04	UMSL	7–20	4–16	9th	
2004–05	UMSL	6–21	2–18	11th	
2005–06	UMSL	16–12	9–10	4th West	0–1 (GLVC
2006–07	UMSL	6–20	2–17	7th West	
UMSL:		35–73 (.324)	17–61 (.218)		
Eastern Illinois Panthers (Ohio Valley Conference) (2012–2013)
2012–13	Eastern Illinois	20–12	12–4	1st West	0–1 (OVC), 1–1 (WNIT 2nd round)
EIU:		20–12 (.625)	12–4 (.750)		
LaGrange Panthers (USA South Conference) (2013–2020)
2013–14	LaGrange	16–11	9–7		
2014–15	LaGrange	17–10	11–5		
2015–16	LaGrange	18–9	11–5		
2016–17	LaGrange	17–10	10–4		
2017–18	LaGrange	11–15	4–10		
2018–19	LaGrange	13–13	7–9		
2019–20	LaGrange	15–11	8–8		
LaGrange:		107–79 (.575)	60–48 (.556)		
Total:		473–307 (.606)			
National champion Postseason invitational champion Conference regular season champion Conference regular season and conference tournament champion Division regular season champion Division regular season and conference tournament champion Conference tournament champion
