= Eastern Illinois Panthers women's basketball =

2026–27 Eastern Illinois Panthers women's basketball team
- University: Eastern Illinois University
- Athletic director: Tom Michael
- Head coach: Marqus McGlothan (3rd season)
- Location: Charleston, Illinois
- Arena: Lantz Arena (capacity: 5,300)
- Conference: Ohio Valley Conference
- Nickname: Panthers
- Colors: Blue and gray

NCAA Division I tournament appearances
- 1988

AIAW tournament quarterfinals
- Division II: 1981
Other AIAW tournament results
Appearances	Division II: 1981

Conference tournament champions
- Gateway: 1988

Conference regular-season champions
- Gateway: 1988; OVC: 2010, 2013

The Eastern Illinois Panthers women's basketball team is the basketball team that represents Eastern Illinois University in Charleston, Illinois, United States. The school's team currently competes in the Ohio Valley Conference.

== History ==
Eastern Illinois began play in 1973, and for the first several years, they would play in AIAW Tournaments that ranged from the state DII State Tournament to the Midwest AIAW DII Regional Tournament. The 1980-81 team won 25 games and made it all the way to the AIAW DII Nationals in the round of eight. The team joined the Gateway Collegiate Athletic Conference in 1982. They reached the Gateway Tournament final in 1987 and 1988. Eastern Illinois won the Gateway Conference tournament in 1988, defeating Illinois State 80-79 to reach their first NCAA Tournament. They lost 78–72 in Charleston, Illinois against Colorado in the NCAA Division Tournament. In 1992, when the conference merged with the Missouri Valley Conference, the women's team joined the men in being a part of the Mid-Continent Conference. They left the conference to join the Ohio Valley Conference in 1996. They have made the WNIT in 2010 and 2013. As of the end of the 2015–16 season, the Panthers have an all-time record of 576–645.

== Season Results ==
Year	Coach	Overall record	Conference record	Conference standing	Postseason
1973–74	Helen Riley	10–9	—	—	—
1974–75	Helen Riley	7–13	—	—	—
1975–76	Helen Riley	9–10	—	—	—
1976–77	Melinda Fischer	14–7	—	—	—
1977–78	Melinda Fischer	8–11	—	—	—
1978–79	Melinda Fischer	15–11	—	—	—
1979–80	Barbara Hilke	20–10	—	—	—
1980–81	Barbara Hilke	25–8	—	—	AIAW Division II Quarterfinals
1981–82	Barbara Hilke	22–11	—	—	—
Gateway Collegiate Athletic Conference
1982–83	Barbara Hilke	22–7	2–3		—
1983–84	Barbara Hilke	16–12	10–8	5th of 10	—
1984–85	Barbara Hilke	16–12	8–10	5th of 10	—
1985–86	Barbara Hilke	18–10	10–8	5th of 10	—
1986–87	Barbara Hilke	17–13	11–7	3rd of 10	—
1987–88	Barbara Hilke	22–8	14–4	1st of 10	NCAA first round
1988–89	Barbara Hilke	16–12	11–7	4th of 10	—
1989–90	Barbara Hilke	15–12	11–7	5th of 10	—
1990–91	Barbara Hilke	14–13	9–9	T-5th of 10	—
1991–92	Barbara Hilke	8–19	4–14	9th of 10	—
Mid-Continent Conference
1992–93	Barbara Hilke	3–24	2–14	8th of 9	—
1993–94	John Klein	5–21	3–15	T-9th of 10	—
1994–95	John Klein	16–12	10–8	5th of 10	—
1995–96	John Klein	12–15	9–9	T-6th of 10	—
Ohio Valley Conference
1996–97	John Klein	12–15	8–10	5th of 10	—
1997–98	John Klein	12–15	10–8	5th of 10	—
1998–99	John Klein	5–21	3–15	T-9th of 10	
1999–00	Linda Wunder	8–19	6–12	T-8th of 10	—
2000–01	Linda Wunder	7–20	3–13	9th of 9	—
2001–02	Linda Wunder	7–21	6–10	T-6th of 9	—
2002–03	Linda Wunder	6–22	5–11	7th of 9	—
2003–04	Linda Wunder	8–19	5–11	9th of 11	—
2004–05	Brady Sallee	10–17	3–13	10th of 11	—
2005–06	Brady Sallee	10–19	9–11	7th of 11	—
2006–07	Brady Sallee	10–19	7–13	9th of 11	—
2007–08	Brady Sallee	19–13	15–5	T-2nd of 11	—
2008–09	Brady Sallee	24–9	15–3	2nd of 10	—
2009–10	Brady Sallee	23–11	16–2	1st of 10	WNIT 1st Round
2010–11	Brady Sallee	18–13	13–5	T-3rd of 10	WBI 1st Round
2011–12	Brady Sallee	22–9	13–3	2nd of 11	WNIT 1st Round
2012–13	Lee Buchanan	20–12	12–4	1st West	WNIT 2nd Round
2013–14	Debbie Black	12–16	7–9	T-2nd West	—
2014–15	Debbie Black	10–20	7–9	T-7th of 12	—
2015–16	Debbie Black	3–25	2–14	12th of 12	—
2016–17	Debbie Black	9–19	5–11	12th of 12	—
2017–18	Matt Bollant	3–26	2–16	12th of 12	—
2018–19	Matt Bollant	11–18	5–13	T-10th of 12	—
2019–20	Matt Bollant	19–12	12–6	4th of 12	—
2020–21	Matt Bollant	11–15	9–11	8th of 12	—
2021–22	Matt Bollant	16–14	11–7	T-4th of 10	—
2022–23	Matt Bollant	21–8	14–4	2nd of 10	—
2023–24	Matt Bollant	15–18	11–7	T-2nd of 11	—
2024–25	Marqus McGlothan	18–12	15–5	3rd of 11	—
Totals	9 Coaches; 50 Years				6 Postseason Appearances

== Postseason ==
=== NCAA Division I ===
The Panthers have appeared in the NCAA Division I Tournament one time. Their record is 0–1.

Year	Seed	Round	Opponent	Result
1988	#10	First Round	#7 Colorado	L 78–72

=== WNIT results ===
The Panthers have appeared in the Women's National Invitation Tournament (WNIT) three times. Their record is 1–3.

Year	Round	Opponent	Result
2010	First Round	Marquette	L 56–85
2012	First Round	Texas Tech	L 71–85
2013	First Round; Second Round	Missouri; Illinois	W 60–58; L 54–62

=== WBI results ===
The Panthers have appeared in the Women's Basketball Invitational (WBI) once. Their record is 0–1.

Year	Round	Opponent	Result
2011	First Round	Chicago State	L 64–73

=== AIAW College Division/Division II ===
The Panthers made one appearance in the AIAW National Division II basketball tournament, with a record of 1–1.

Year	Round	Opponent	Result
1981	First Round; Quarterfinals	Colorado College; William Penn	W, 77–69; L, 73–53

== Retired Numbers ==
No.	Player	Position	Career	Date of Retirement
13	Nancy Kassebaum	G	1979–83	February 24, 2005
