= Lee L. Buchanan =

American entomologist

Lee L. Buchanan (1893–1958) was an American entomologist.

== Biography ==
Buchanan was born in 1893. Starting from 1917 to 1929 he worked as an assistant biologist for the Bureau of Biological Survey, a division of United States Department of Agriculture. After that, he got a job as entomologist for the Bureau of Entomology and Plant Quarantine, that was also a division of USDA. He kept that position till he retired in 1949. From 1926 to 1958 he also served as an honorary specialist for the Casey Collection of Coleoptera, a division of United States National Museum. He died in 1958.
