= 1992 NCAA Division I women's basketball tournament =

American college basketball tournament

- Teams: 48
- Finals site: Los Angeles Memorial Sports Arena, Los Angeles, California
- Champions: Stanford Cardinal (2nd title, 2nd title game, 3rd Final Four)
- Runner-up: Western Kentucky Lady Toppers (1st title game, 3rd Final Four)
- Semifinalists: Virginia Cavaliers (3rd Final Four); Southwest Missouri State Lady Bears (1st Final Four)
- Winning coach: Tara VanDerveer (2nd title)
- MOP: Molly Goodenbour (Stanford Cardinal)

The 1992 NCAA Division I women's basketball tournament began on March 18 and ended on April 5. The tournament featured 48 teams. The Final Four consisted of Virginia Cavaliers, Stanford Cardinal, Southwest Missouri State Lady Bears (now known as Missouri State), and Western Kentucky Lady Toppers, with Stanford defeating Western Kentucky 78–62 to win its second NCAA title. Stanford's Molly Goodenbour was named the Most Outstanding Player of the tournament.

== Notable events ==
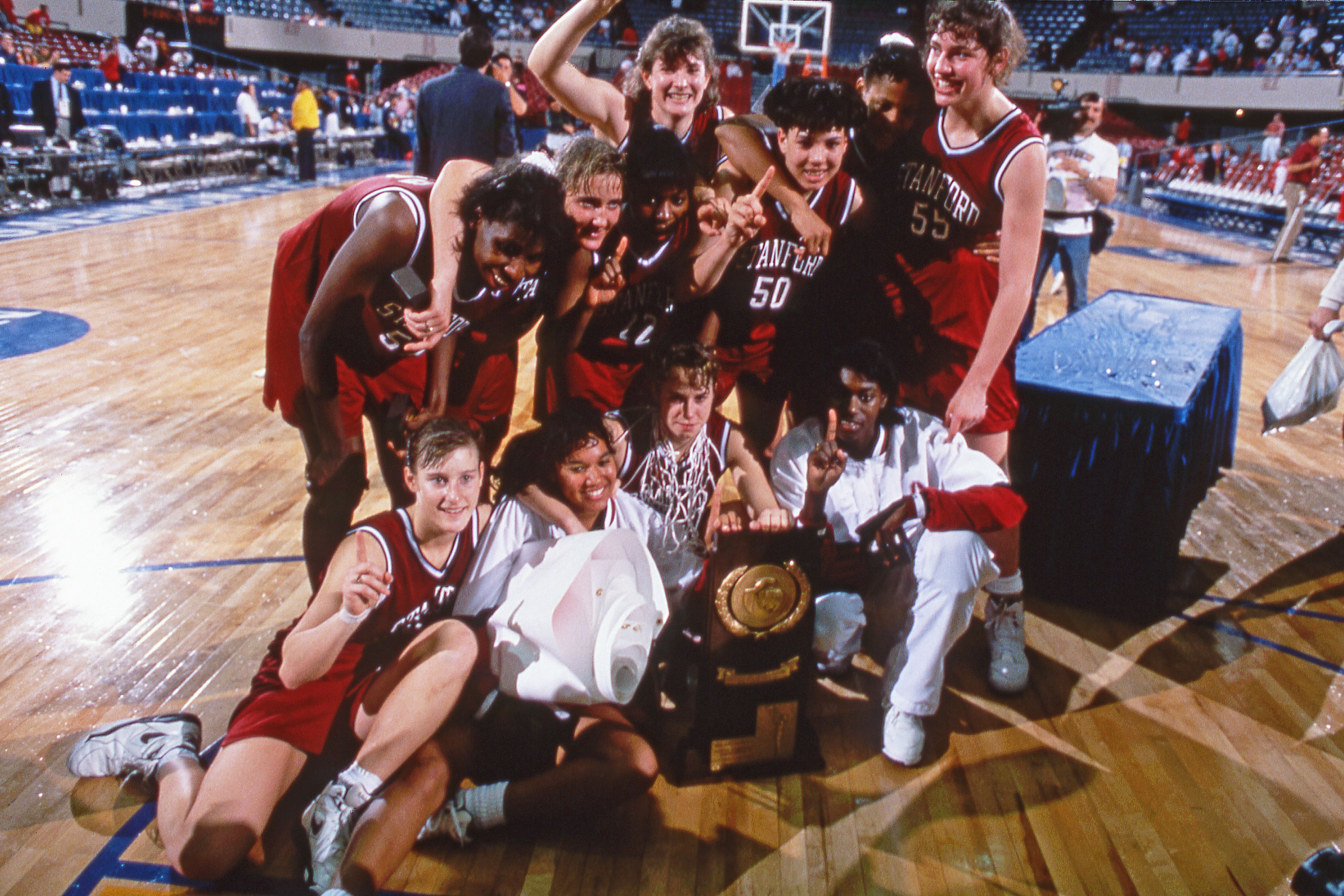
Stanford Cardinal team with National Championship Trophy

Missouri State (then Southwest Missouri State), was not a regular participant in the Tournament. They had not earned a bid until 1991, when they won their first game and lost their second game. In 1992, they were assigned an eight seed. Their first game was against Kansas, which they won 75–59. That win matched them up against the number one seed in the Midwest region, Iowa. The Hawkeyes were 25–3, winner of the Big Ten conference in their ninth year under Hall of Fame coach C. Vivian Stringer. Despite the odds, the Southwest Missouri State team took Iowa to overtime, and won 61–60 in the overtime period. That matched up the Lady Bears against fifth-seeded UCLA, but Southwest Missouri State won easily, 83–57. Their next game was against SEC regular season champion Ole Miss, one of a small number of teams who had played in every NCAA tournament since the first one in 1982. Ole Miss was the number two seed in the region, but Southwest Missouri State again achieved an upset, winning the game 94–71. That win placed the Lady Bears in the Final Four. Prior to this win, the lowest seed to make it to the Final Four was a four seed. Only one team, Arkansas in 1998, with a nine seed, has made it to the Final four with a weaker seed.

Southwest Missouri State's opponent in the semi-final game was Western Kentucky, who has also achieved some upsets. After beating Alabama, the Lady Toppers faced Tennessee, the number one seed in the Mideast region, and the defending national champions. Western Kentucky won the game 75–70, and went on to beat the number 2 seed in the region, Maryland, by the identical score.

The other semi-final included two of the powerhouses of the sport at the time. Both Virginia and Stanford were number one seeds. Stanford had won the National championship two years before, while Virginia was competing in their third consecutive final four, and were the runner-up in the prior year's tournament.

In the game between Western Kentucky and Southwest Missouri State, the Lady Toppers dashed the upset hopes of the Lady Bears, and won the game 84–72. The game between Stanford and Virginia was much closer, with Virginia leading late but Stanford pulled to a small lead. Virginia's Dawn Staley scored to cut the lead to one with eleven seconds left. Stanford now controlled the ball, and in bounded it, but with time running out, the ball was loose on the floor. Staley dived after the loose ball, recovered it and flung it to teammate Melanee Wagener while Staley called for a timeout. The referee did not hear her call for the timeout, then heard the horn announcing the end of the game, so the refs and the teams headed off the court. Staley chased after Doug Cloud, the referee, insisting she had called a time out. A different referee, Bob Trammell, had heard her call for the timeout, so the teams were called back, and a fraction of a second were placed back on the clock. Virginia in bounded the ball and got it to Staley, but she was unable to get a final shot off. Stanford coach Tara VanDerveer would call it, "the longest seven-tenths of a second in my life". The Cardinal won a one-point game 66–65. Van Derveer would later recount the story when preparing to train the USA National team, including Staley, for the 1996 Olympics.

After losing three starters from the prior year's team, including All-American Sonia Henning, some observers, including assistant coach Amy Tucker, were not expecting a stellar season. Their point guard, Molly Goodenbour, had not seen a lot of playing time in prior years playing behind Henning and Jennifer Azzi, but she would go on to hit 18 three-pointers in the tournament, at the time an NCAA record, and win the MVP award for the tournament. Teammates Rachel Hemmer and Val Whiting also earned spots on the All-Tournament team as the team won a 78–62 victory over Western Kentucky to claim their second national championship in three years.

== Records ==
- Free throws – Tonya Baucom (Southwest Missouri State) hit nine of nine free throws attempts, tied with several others for free throw accuracy at 100%, and second only behind Sheryl Swoopes for free throws made in a Final Four without a miss. This occurred in the National Semi-final against Western Kentucky.

== Qualifying teams – automatic ==
Forty-eight teams were selected to participate in the 1992 NCAA Tournament. Twenty-two conferences were eligible for an automatic bid to the 1992 NCAA tournament.

Automatic bids
		Record		
Qualifying School	Conference	Regular Season	Conference	Seed
University of Tennessee at Chattanooga	SoCon	18–11	8–2	12
University of Colorado at Boulder	Big Eight	22–8	11–3	7
Creighton University	WAC	27–3	13–1	7
George Washington University	Atlantic 10	24–6	11–5	8
University of Iowa	Big Ten	25–3	16–2	1
University of Miami	Big East	29–1	18–0	2
University of Montana	Big Sky	22–6	13–3	11
Northern Illinois University	North Star	17–13	8–4	11
Old Dominion University	CAA	20–10	9–5	10
Saint Peter's College	MAAC	24–6	13–3	11
Santa Clara University	West Coast	20–9	10–4	12
University of Southern Mississippi	Metro	21–9	9–3	9
Southwest Missouri State University	Gateway	27–2	17–1	8
Stanford University	Pac-10	25–3	15–3	1
Stephen F. Austin State University	Southland	27–2	17–1	2
University of Tennessee	SEC	27–2	10–1	1
Tennessee Technological University	OVC	21–8	13–1	12
Texas Tech University	Southwest	26–4	13–1	4
University of Toledo	MAC	25–5	15–1	10
University of California, Santa Barbara	Big West	26–4	16–2	9
University of Virginia	ACC	29–1	15–1	1
Western Kentucky University	Sun Belt	23–7	13–3	4
University of Notre Dame	Midwestern Collegiate	14–16	8–4	12

== Qualifying teams – at-large ==
Twenty-six additional teams were selected to complete the forty-eight invitations.

At-large Bids
		Record		
Qualifying School	Conference	Regular Season	Conference	Seed
University of Alabama	SEC	22–6	7–4	5
Arizona State University	Pacific-10	20–8	11–7	6
University of California, Berkeley	Pacific-10	20–8	12–6	5
Clemson University	ACC	20–9	9–7	5
University of Connecticut	Big East	22–10	13–5	6
DePaul University	Great Midwest	20–9	8–2	11
University of Houston	Southwest	22–7	10–4	8
University of Kansas	Big Eight	25–5	12–2	9
California State University, Long Beach	Big West	21–9	13–5	10
Louisiana Tech University	Sun Belt	20–9	12–4	6
University of Maryland, College Park	ACC	23–5	13–3	2
University of Mississippi (Ole Miss)	SEC	27–2	11–0	2
University of North Carolina at Chapel Hill	ACC	21–8	9–7	7
Pennsylvania State University	Independent	23–6	–-	3
Providence College	Big East	21–8	13–5	7
Purdue University	Big Ten	22–6	14–4	3
Rutgers University	Atlantic 10	20–10	11–5	8
University of Southern California	Pacific-10	21–7	14–4	3
Southern Illinois University Carbondale	Gateway	22–7	15–3	10
University of Texas at Austin	Southwest	21–9	11–3	4
University of California, Los Angeles	Pacific-10	19–9	12–6	5
Vanderbilt University	SEC	20–8	6–5	3
University of Vermont	North Atlantic	29–0	14–0	9
West Virginia University	Atlantic 10	25–3	16–0	4
University of Wisconsin–Madison	Big Ten	20–8	13–5	6

== Bids by conference ==
Twenty-two conferences earned an automatic bid. In eleven cases, the automatic bid was the only representative from the conference. Three conferences, the Great Midwest, the Midwestern Collegiate, and the North Atlantic conferences sent a single representative as an at-large team. One independent school was selected. Twenty-five additional at-large teams were selected from ten of the conferences.

Bids	Conference	Teams
5	Pacific-10	Stanford, Arizona State, California, USC, UCLA
4	ACC	Virginia, Clemson, Maryland, North Carolina
4	SEC	Tennessee, Alabama, Ole Miss, Vanderbilt
3	Atlantic 10	George Washington, Rutgers, West Virginia
3	Big East	Miami (FL), Connecticut, Providence
3	Big Ten	Iowa, Purdue, Wisconsin
3	Southwest	Texas Tech, Houston, Texas
2	Big Eight	Colorado, Kansas
2	Big West	UC Santa Barbara, Long Beach State
2	Gateway	SW Missouri State, Southern Illinois
2	Sun Belt	Western Kentucky, Louisiana Tech
1	Big Sky	Montana
1	CAA	Old Dominion
1	Great Midwest	DePaul
1	Independent	Penn State
1	Metro	Southern Miss
1	Metro Atlantic	St. Peter's
1	Mid-American	Toledo
1	Midwestern Collegiate	Notre Dame
1	North Atlantic	Vermont
1	North Star	Northern Illinois
1	OVC	Tennessee Tech
1	Southern	Chattanooga
1	Southland	Stephen F. Austin
1	West Coast	Santa Clara
1	WAC	Creighton

== First and second rounds ==
1992 NCAA first round
1992 NCAA second round

In 1992, the field remained at 48 teams. The teams were seeded, and assigned to four geographic regions, with seeds 1–12 in each region. In Round 1, seeds 8 and 9 faced each other for the opportunity to face the 1 seed in the second round, seeds 7 and 10 played for the opportunity to face the 2 seed, seeds 5 and 12 played for the opportunity to face the 4 seed, and seeds 6 and 11 played for the opportunity to face the 3 seed. In the first two rounds, the higher seed was given the opportunity to host the first-round game. In most cases, the higher seed accepted the opportunity. The exceptions:

- Sixth seeded Arizona State played eleventh seeded DePaul at DePaul
- Ninth seeded UC Santa Barbara played eighth seeded Houston at UC Santa Barbara

The following table lists the region, host school, venue and the thirty-two first and second round locations:

Region	Rnd	Host	Venue	City	State
East	1	Clemson University	Littlejohn Coliseum	Clemson	South Carolina
East	1	University of Connecticut	Harry A. Gampel Pavilion	Storrs	Connecticut
East	1	George Washington University	Charles E. Smith Athletic Center	Washington	District of Columbia
East	1	University of North Carolina at Chapel Hill	Carmichael Auditorium	Chapel Hill	North Carolina
East	2	Vanderbilt University	Memorial Gymnasium	Nashville	Tennessee
East	2	University of Virginia	University Hall	Charlottesville	Virginia
East	2	West Virginia University	WVU Coliseum	Morgantown	West Virginia
East	2	University of Miami	Knight Sports Complex	Coral Gables	Florida
Mideast	1	Providence College	Alumni Hall	Providence	Rhode Island
Mideast	1	University of Alabama	Coleman Coliseum	Tuscaloosa	Alabama
Mideast	1	Rutgers University	Louis Brown Athletic Center	Piscataway	New Jersey
Mideast	1	Louisiana Tech University	Thomas Assembly Center	Ruston	Louisiana
Mideast	2	Purdue University	Mackey Arena	West Lafayette	Indiana
Mideast	2	University of Maryland, College Park	Cole Field House	College Park	Maryland
Mideast	2	Western Kentucky University	E.A. Diddle Arena	Bowling Green	Kentucky
Mideast	2	University of Tennessee	Thompson–Boling Arena	Knoxville	Tennessee
Midwest	1	University of Colorado at Boulder	CU Events Center (Coors Events Center)	Boulder	Colorado
Midwest	1	DePaul University	Chick Evans Field House	DeKalb	Illinois
Midwest	1	Southwest Missouri State University	Hammons Student Center	Springfield	Missouri
Midwest	1	University of California, Los Angeles	Pauley Pavilion	Los Angeles	California
Midwest	2	University of Iowa	Carver–Hawkeye Arena	Iowa City	Indiana
Midwest	2	University of Texas at Austin	Frank Erwin Center	Austin	Texas
Midwest	2	University of Mississippi (Ole Miss)	Tad Smith Coliseum	Oxford	Mississippi
Midwest	2	Pennsylvania State University	Recreation Building (Rec Hall)	University Park	Pennsylvania
West	1	University of California, Santa Barbara	UC Santa Barbara Events Center	Santa Barbara	California
West	1	University of California, Berkeley	Harmon Gym	Berkeley	California
West	1	Creighton University	Omaha Civic Auditorium	Omaha	Nebraska
West	1	University of Wisconsin–Madison	Wisconsin Field House	Madison	Wisconsin
West	2	University of Southern California	Los Angeles Memorial Sports Arena	Los Angeles	California
West	2	Stanford University	Maples Pavilion	Stanford	California
West	2	Stephen F. Austin State University	William R. Johnson Coliseum	Nacogdoches	Texas
West	2	Texas Tech University	Lubbock Municipal Coliseum	Lubbock	Texas

== Regionals and Final Four ==
1992 NCAA regionals and Final Four

The regionals, named for the general location, were held from March 26 to March 28 at these sites:

- East Regional University Hall, Charlottesville, Virginia (Host: University of Virginia)
- Mideast Regional Mackey Arena, West Lafayette, Indiana (Host: Purdue University)
- Midwest Regional CU Events Center (Coors Events Center), Boulder, Colorado (Host: University of Colorado at Boulder)
- West Regional Hec Edmundson Pavilion, Seattle (Host: University of Washington)

Each regional winner advanced to the Final Four, held April 4 and April 5 in Los Angeles at the Los Angeles Memorial Sports Arena (co-hosts: University of Southern California, University of California, Los Angeles)

== Bids by state ==
The forty-eight teams came from twenty-nine states, plus Washington, D.C. California had the most teams with seven bids, the first time in tournament history a state had more than four bids. Twenty-one states did not have any teams receiving bids.

NCAA Women's basketball Tournament invitations by state 1992

Bids	State	Teams
7	California	Santa Clara, Stanford, UC Santa Barbara, California, Long Beach State, USC, UCLA
4	Tennessee	Chattanooga, Tennessee, Tennessee Tech, Vanderbilt
4	Texas	Stephen F. Austin, Texas Tech, Houston, Texas
3	Illinois	Northern Illinois, DePaul, Southern Illinois
2	Indiana	Notre Dame, Purdue
2	Mississippi	Ole Miss, Southern Miss
2	New Jersey	St. Peter's, Rutgers
2	Virginia	Old Dominion, Virginia
1	Alabama	Alabama
1	Arizona	Arizona State
1	Colorado	Colorado
1	Connecticut	Connecticut
1	District of Columbia	George Washington
1	Florida	Miami
1	Iowa	Iowa
1	Kansas	Kansas
1	Kentucky	Western Kentucky
1	Louisiana	Louisiana Tech
1	Maryland	Maryland
1	Missouri	SW Missouri State
1	Montana	Montana
1	Nebraska	Creighton
1	North Carolina	North Carolina
1	Ohio	Toledo
1	Pennsylvania	Penn State
1	Rhode Island	Providence
1	South Carolina	Clemson
1	Vermont	Vermont
1	West Virginia	West Virginia
1	Wisconsin	Wisconsin

== Brackets ==
First and second-round games played at higher seed except where noted.

=== East regional – Charlottesville, VA ===
First round March 18
8	George Washington	70
9	Vermont	69
5	Clemson	76
12	Chattanooga	72
7	North Carolina	60
10	Old Dominion	54
6	Connecticut	83
11	St. Peter's	66

Second round March 21–22
1	Virginia	97
8	George Washington	58
4	West Virginia	73
5	Clemson	72
2	Miami (FL)	86
7	North Carolina	72
3	Vanderbilt	75
6	Connecticut	47

Regional semifinals March 26
1	Virginia	103
4	West Virginia	83
2	Miami (FL)	67
3	Vanderbilt	77

Regional finals March 28
1	Virginia	70
3	Vanderbilt	58

=== West regional – Seattle, WA ===
First round March 18
8	Houston	69
9	UC Santa Barbara	80
5	California	71
12	at Santa Clara	73
7	Creighton	79
10	Long Beach State	66
6	Wisconsin	74
11	Montana	85

Second round March 21–22
1	Stanford	82
9	UC Santa Barbara	73
4	Texas Tech	64
12	Santa Clara	58
2	Stephen F. Austin	75
7	Creighton	74
3	USC	71
11	Montana	59

Regional semifinals March 26
1	Stanford	75
4	Texas Tech	63
2	Stephen F. Austin	57
3	USC	61

Regional finals March 28
1	Stanford	82
3	USC	62

=== Midwest regional – Boulder, CO ===
First round March 18
8	SW Missouri State	75
9	Kansas	59
5	UCLA	93
12	Notre Dame	72
7	Colorado	80
10	Southern Illinois	84 (OT)
6	Arizona State	65
11	at DePaul	67

Second round March 21–22
1	Iowa	60
8	SW Missouri State	61 (OT)
4	Texas	81
5	UCLA	82
2	Ole Miss	72
10	Southern Illinois	56
3	Penn State	77
11	DePaul	54

Regional semifinals March 26
8	SW Missouri State	83
5	UCLA	57
2	Ole Miss	75
3	Penn State	72

Regional finals March 28
8	SW Missouri State	94
2	Ole Miss	71

=== Mideast regional – West Lafayette, IN ===
First round March 18
8	Rutgers	93
9	Southern Miss	63
5	Alabama	100
12	Tennessee Tech	87
7	Providence	64
10	Toledo	74
6	Louisiana Tech	71
11	Northern Illinois	77 (OT)

Second round March 21–22
1	Tennessee	97
8	Rutgers	56
4	Western Kentucky	98
5	Alabama	68
2	Maryland	73
10	Toledo	60
3	Purdue	98
11	Northern Illinois	62

Regional semifinals March 26
1	Tennessee	70
4	Western Kentucky	75
2	Maryland	64
3	Purdue	58

Regional finals March 28
4	Western Kentucky	75
2	Maryland	70

=== Final Four – Los Angeles, CA ===
National semifinals April 4
1E	Virginia	65
1W	Stanford	66
8MW	SW Missouri State	72
4ME	Western Kentucky	84

National championship April 5
1W	Stanford	78
4ME	Western Kentucky	62

== Record by conference ==
Fifteen conferences had more than one bid, or at least one win in NCAA Tournament play:

Conference	# of Bids	Record	Win %	Round of 32	Sweet Sixteen	Elite Eight	Final Four	Championship Game
Pacific-10	5	9–4	.692	3	3	2	1	1
Atlantic Coast	4	7–4	.636	4	2	2	1	–
Southeastern	4	6–4	.600	4	3	2	–	–
Atlantic 10	3	3–3	.500	3	1	–	–	–
Big East	3	2–3	.400	2	1	–	–	–
Big Ten	3	1–3	.250	2	1	–	–	–
Southwest	3	1–3	.250	2	1	–	–	–
Gateway	2	5–2	.714	2	1	1	1	–
Sun Belt	2	4–2	.667	1	1	1	1	1
Big West	2	1–2	.333	1	–	–	–	–
Big Eight	2	0–2	–	–	–	–	–	–
Big Sky	1	1–1	.500	1	–	–	–	–
Great Midwest	1	1–1	.500	1	–	–	–	–
Independent	1	1–1	.500	1	1	–	–	–
Mid-American	1	1–1	.500	1	–	–	–	–
North Star	1	1–1	.500	1	–	–	–	–
Southland	1	1–1	.500	1	1	–	–	–
West Coast	1	1–1	.500	1	–	–	–	–
Western Athletic	1	1–1	.500	1	–	–	–	–

Seven conferences went 0-1: Colonial, Metro, MAAC, Midwestern Collegiate, North Atlantic Conference, Ohio Valley Conference, and Southern Conference.

== All-Tournament team ==
- Molly Goodenbour, Stanford,
- Rachel Hemmer, Stanford,
- Val Whiting, Stanford
- Kim Pehlke, Western Kentucky
- Dawn Staley, Virginia

== Game officials ==
- Art Bomengen (semifinal)
- Douglas Cloud (semifinal)
- Dee Kantner (semifinal)
- Bob Trammell (semifinal)
- Patty Broderick (final)
- Bill Stokes (final)

== See also ==
- 1992 NCAA Division I men's basketball tournament
- 1992 NCAA Division II women's basketball tournament
- 1992 NCAA Division III women's basketball tournament
- 1992 NAIA Division I women's basketball tournament
- 1992 NAIA Division II women's basketball tournament
