= Timeline of women's basketball =

== 1881–1890 ==
1885

- Formation of the Association for the Advancement of Physical Education

== 1891–1900 ==
1891

- James Naismith, born in Almonte, Ontario, invents basketball while teaching at a school now known as Springfield College

1892

- Senda Berenson reads about Dr. Naismith's new game, and with modified rules, introduces the game to Smith College students.
- First inter-institutional game between the University of California, Berkeley and Miss Head's School.

1893

- Clara Gregory Baer introduces basket-ball (as it was written at the time) to Sophie Newcomb College (now part of Tulane University)

1894

- RULE Change—Dribbling and guarding another player prohibited

1895

- Clara Gregory Baer writes the first book of rules for women's basketball.
- The first public women's basketball game in the South is played at a men's only club, the Southern Athletic Club.

1896

- First intercollegiate contest between the University of California, Berkeley and Stanford was held on April 4, 1896. Stanford won, 2–1.

1897

- First recorded women's basketball game in Australia, played in Victoria, using wet paper bags for baskets.
- First women's high school game between Austin High and Oak Park. Won by Austin 16–4.

1899

- Senda Berenson publishes the first issue of Basketball Guide for Women, which she would edit and update for eighteen years. These rules, with minor modifications, would remain in use until the 1960s.
- Stanford abolishes intercollegiate competition of women. (The players formed an independent club team).
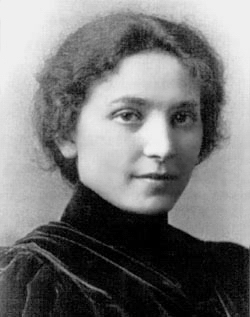
Senda Berenson

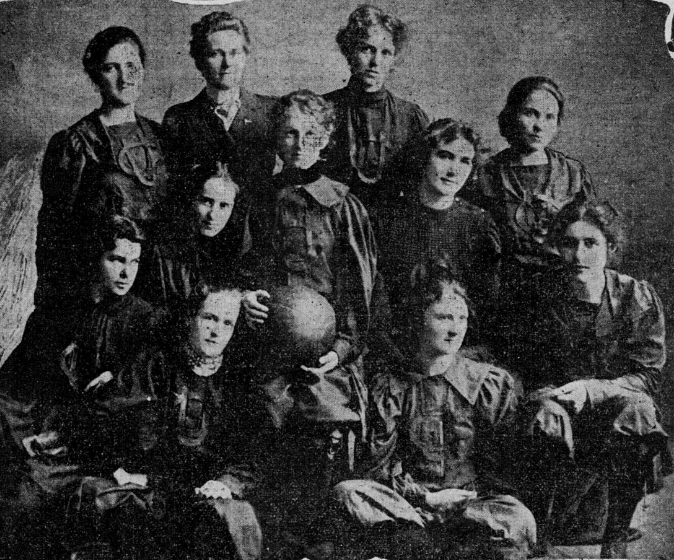
University of California-Berkeley women's basketball team, photographed in 1899

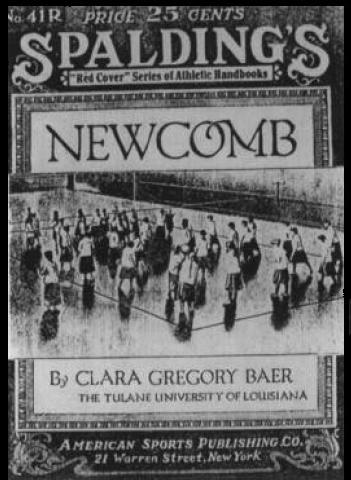
Clara Gregory Baer's original rules of Newcomb ball

== 1901–1910 ==
1904

- Stanford rescinds the prohibition against intercollegiate competition of women.

1906

- Women's basketball featured on the cover of the Saturday Evening Post
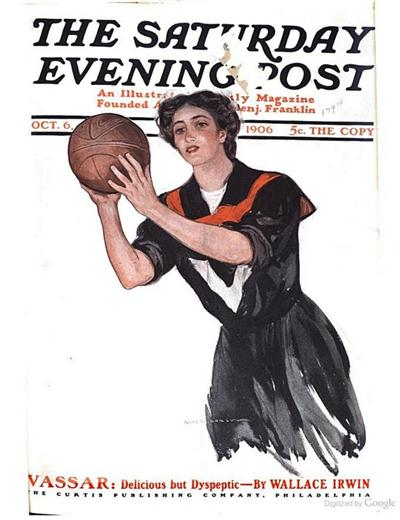
Saturday evening post 1906 Oct 06 featuring women's basketball

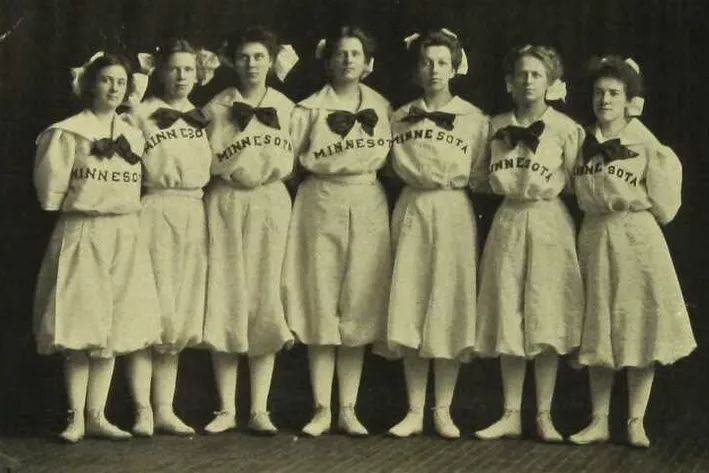
1909 University of Minnesota women's basketball team

== 1911–1920 ==
1913

- RULE Change—A single dribble is permitted as long as it bounces knee-high

1914

- RULE Change—Half-court play is allowed.

1915

- The Edmonton Grads, then known as the Commercial High School basketball team, won the Intercollegiate Basketball League. They would go on to play as the Grads, with a record of 502–20 between 1915 and 1940. James Naismith would go on to refer to them as "the finest basketball team that ever stepped out on a floor".

1916

- RULE Change—Coaching from sidelines prohibited during game, except for halftime

1918

- RULE Change—The bottom of the basket is removed. Substitutes allowed for first time (but cannot re-enter game). The bounce pass is allowed

== 1921–1930 ==
1921

- Basketball played for perhaps the first time in Europe at the 1921 Women's Olympiad

1926

- The Amateur Athletic Union sponsored the first-ever American national women's basketball championship.

1927

- RULE Change—Players must wear a number on the back

== 1931–1940 ==
1932

- RULE Change—guarding another player first allowed
- FIBA, the International Basketball Federation, is formed in Geneva.

1936

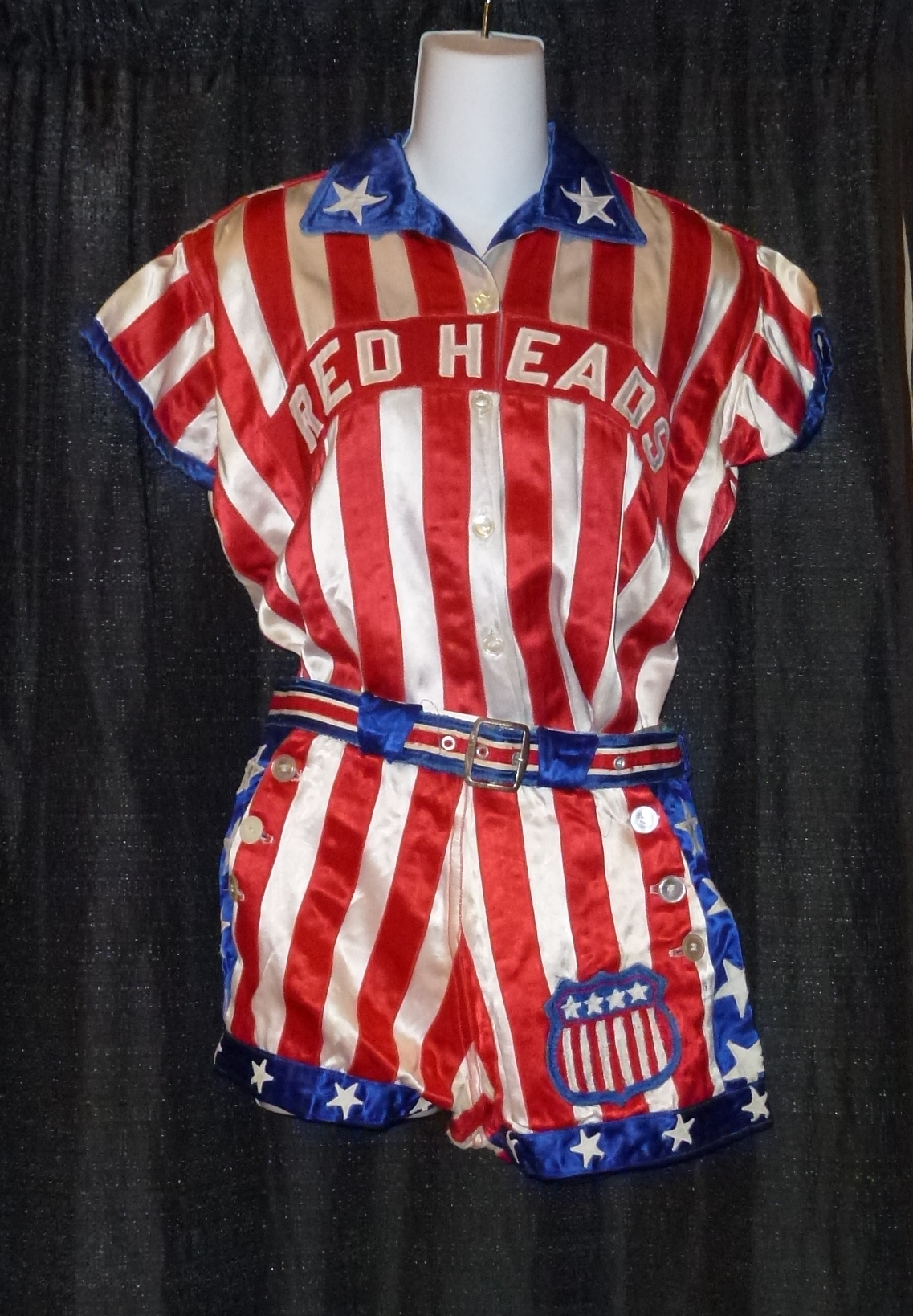
Uniform worn by the All American Red Heads Team

- RULE Change—the first time a guard, called a "rover" was allowed to play the entire court
- The All American Red Heads Team a barnstorming professional team was formed. They were the first professional women's basketball team. They would go on to tour the country for 50 years, playing men's teams using men's rules.

1938

- RULE Change—The court is now divided into two sections, rather than three. Team size remains six players each.

== 1941–1950 ==
1947

- RULE Change—Players must wear a number on the front and the back

1949

- Hazel Walker became the first woman to own a professional basketball team, the Arkansas Travelers.
- RULE Change—Players now allowed a two-bounce dribble. (Continuous dribble used in experimental season, but not adopted)

== 1951–1960 ==
1951

- RULE Change—Coaching from sidelines during time outs permitted

1953

- First FIBA World Championship for Women

Gold—USA
Silver—Chile
Bronze—France

1955

- Missouri (Arledge) Morris—named an All-American, the first black AAU All-American
- RULE Change—Three second rule implemented. Players in the offensive lane may not hold the ball for more than three seconds.

1957

- FIBA World Championship for Women

Gold—USA
Silver—Soviet Union
Bronze—Czechoslovakia

1958

- Wayland Baptist won 131 consecutive games, a streak that extends from 1954 to 1958.

1959

- FIBA World Championship for Women

Gold—Soviet Union
Silver—Bulgaria
Bronze—Czechoslovakia

== 1961–1970 ==
1962

- First women officials in AAU national tournament—Fran Koening and Carol Walter
- RULE Change—Two "rovers" allowed (players permitted to run the entire court)

1964

- FIBA World Championship for Women

Gold—Soviet Union
Silver—Czechoslovakia
Bronze—Bulgaria

1966

- RULE Change—Continuous dribble allowed

1967

- FIBA World Championship for Women

Gold—Soviet Union
Silver—Korea
Bronze—Czechoslovakia

1968

- RULE Change—Coaching from sidelines during game permitted

1969

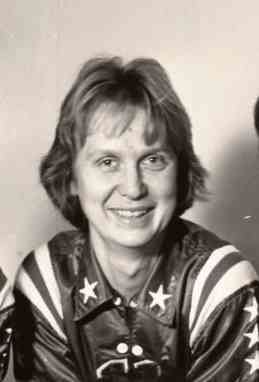
Nera White

- Carol Eckman forms the first National Invitational Women's Intercollegiate Basketball Tournament
- Nera White is named an AAU All-American for the 15th consecutive year.
- West Chester (Pennsylvania) defeated Western Carolina 65–39 in the CIAW invitational tournament

1970

- Cal State-Fullerton defeated West Chester 50–46 in the CIAW invitational tournament

== 1971–1980 ==
1971

- FIBA World Championship for Women

Gold—Soviet Union
Silver—Czechoslovakia
Bronze—Brazil

- RULE Change—Full court, five player game instituted for first time for collegiate and AAU games. A thirty-second shot clock was also implemented.
- The Association for Intercollegiate Athletics for Women (AIAW) formed to govern collegiate women's athletics in the United States and to administer national championships. The transition from the CIAW to the AIAW covered a ten-month period starting in April 1971.
- Mississippi State College for Women defeated West Chester 57–55 in the CIAW invitational tournament

1972

- Title IX signed into law June 23, 1972.
- UBC Thunderbirds won the inaugural Bronze Baby, awarded to the winner of the Canadian Intercollegiate Athletic Union (CIAU; now U Sports) women's basketball tournament.
- Immaculata (Pennsylvania) defeated West Chester 52–48 in the DGWS invitational tournament

1973

- First (partial) scholarships offered to female students
- UBC Thunderbirds won the Bronze Baby, awarded to the CIAU winner in women's basketball
- Immaculata defeated Queens (New York) 59–52 in the AIAW invitational tournament

1974

- First full scholarship offered. The recipient was Ann Meyers who attended UCLA
- UBC Thunderbirds won the Bronze Baby, awarded to the CIAU winner in women's basketball
- Immaculata defeated Mississippi State College for Women 68–53 in the AIAW invitational tournament

1975

- The first nationally televised game is played by Maryland and Immaculata. Some sources report that Immaculata won 80–48, while others report 85–63.
- First Kodak All-American team is named.
- FIBA World Championship for Women

Gold—Soviet Union
Silver—Japan
Bronze—Czechoslovakia

- Laurentian Lady Vees won the Bronze Baby, awarded to the CIAU winner in women's basketball
- Delta State (Mississippi) defeated Immaculata 90–81 in the AIAW large college invitational tournament
- Phillips University (Oklahoma) won the AIAW Division II invitational tournament

1976

- First Olympic competition for women

Gold—Soviet Union
Silver—USA
Bronze—Bulgaria

- Laurentian Lady Vees won the Bronze Baby, awarded to the CIAU winner in women's basketball
- Delta State defeated Immaculata 69–64 in the AIAW large college invitational tournament
- Berry College (Georgia) won the AIAW Division II invitational tournament

1977

- Parade Magazine names its first high school All-American team for girls' basketball. The first team includes future Women's Basketball Hall of Fame members Denise Curry, Cindy Noble and Lynette Woodard.
- First Broderick Cup awarded to "the best athlete in each sport". The first recipient was Lusia Harris.
- Laurentian Lady Vees won the Bronze Baby, awarded to the CIAU winner in women's basketball
- Delta State defeated LSU 68–55 in the AIAW large college invitational tournament
- Southeastern Louisiana won the AIAW Division II invitational tournament

1978

- The Women's Professional Basketball League formed, the first professional women's basketball league in the United States. It lasted until 1981.
- First Wade Trophy awarded to the best women's basketball player in National Collegiate Athletic Association (NCAA) Division I competition The first recipient was Carol Blazejowski.
- Laurentian Lady Vees won the Bronze Baby, awarded to the CIAU winner in women's basketball
- UCLA defeated Maryland 90–74 in the AIAW large college invitational tournament
- High Point (North Carolina) won the AIAW Division II invitational tournament

1979

- FIBA World Championship for Women

Gold—USA
Silver—Korea
Bronze—Canada

- Laurentian Lady Vees won the Bronze Baby, awarded to the Canadian Interuniversity Sport (CIS; now U Sports) winner in women's basketball
- Old Dominion defeated Louisiana Tech 75–65 in the AIAW large college invitational tournament
- South Carolina State won the AIAW Division II invitational tournament

1980

- Olympic competition for women

Gold—Soviet Union
Silver—Bulgaria
Bronze—Yugoslavia

- Victoria Vikes won the Bronze Baby, awarded to the CIS winner in women's basketball
- Australian Institute of Sport (AIS) established, with responsibility for eight sports including basketball
- Old Dominion defeated Tennessee 68–53 in the AIAW Division I invitational tournament
- University of Dayton won the AIAW Division II invitational tournament
- Worcester State College (Massachusetts) won the AIAW Division III invitational tournament

== 1981–1990 ==
1981

- The Women's Basketball Coaches Association (WBCA), an association of coaches of women's basketball teams at all levels, is formed.
- Victoria Vikes won the Bronze Baby, awarded to the Canadian Interuniversity Sport winner in women's basketball
- Louisiana Tech defeated Tennessee 79–59 in the AIAW Division I invitational tournament
- William Penn College (Iowa) won the AIAW Division II invitational tournament
- Wisconsin–La Crosse won the AIAW Division III invitational tournament
- Inaugural season of the Australian Women's National Basketball League
- St Kilda Saints won the Australian Women's National Basketball League Championship

1982

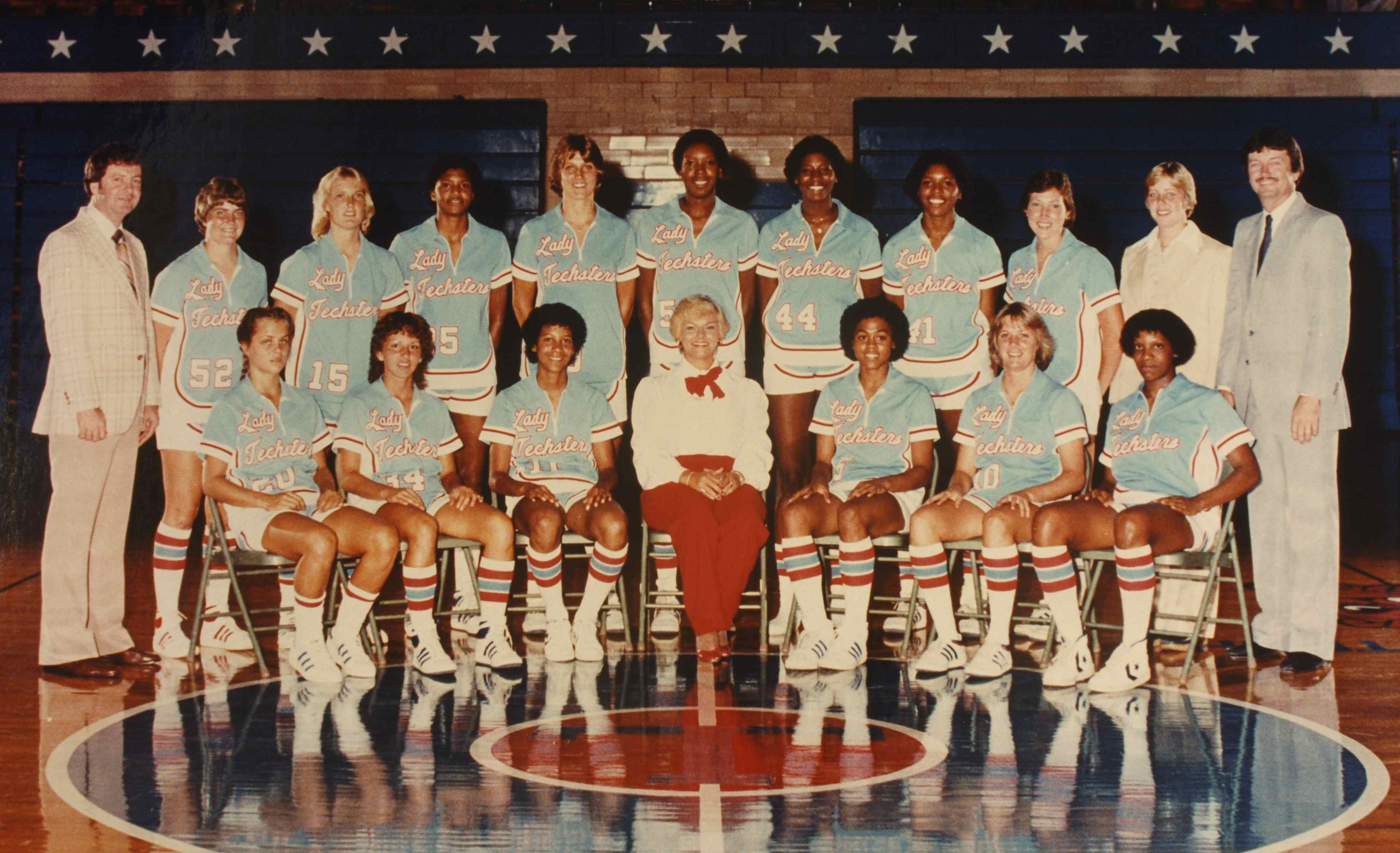
Louisiana Tech–1982 National Champions

- Louisiana Tech (35–1) won the first NCAA Division I women's basketball tournament
- Cal Poly Pomona (29-7) won the first NCAA Women's Division II Basketball Championship
- Elizabethtown (26-1) won the first NCAA Women's Division III Basketball Championship
- Victoria Vikes won the Bronze Baby, awarded to the Canadian Interuniversity Sport winner in women's basketball
- Rutgers defeated Texas 83–77 in the final AIAW Division I invitational tournament
- Francis Marion College (South Carolina) won the AIAW Division II invitational tournament
- Concordia College (Minnesota) won the AIAW Division III invitational tournament
- St Kilda Saints won the Australian Women's National Basketball League Championship

1983

- USC (31–2) won the NCAA Division I women's basketball tournament
- Virginia Union (27-2) won the NCAA Women's Division II Basketball Championship
- North Central (Ill.) (26-6) won the NCAA Women's Division III Basketball Championship
- Bishop's Gaiters won the Bronze Baby, awarded to the Canadian Interuniversity Sport winner in women's basketball
- Nunawading Spectres won the Australian Women's National Basketball League Championship
- FIBA World Championship for Women

Gold—Soviet Union
Silver—USA
Bronze—Chile

1984

- RULE Change—The ball circumference for NCAA play is reduced by one inch (to 28.5–29 inches) compared to the ball used previously, and used by men. This size ball is also called size 6.
- Olympic competition for women

Gold—USA
Silver—Korea
Bronze—China

- West Virginia's Georgeann Wells became the first woman to register a dunk in an official NCAA intercollegiate basketball game.
- USC (29–4) won the NCAA Division I women's basketball tournament
- Central Missouri (27-5) won the NCAA Women's Division II Basketball Championship
- Rust (26-5) won the NCAA Women's Division III Basketball Championship
- Bishop's Gaiters won the Bronze Baby, awarded to the Canadian Interuniversity Sport winner in women's basketball
- Nunawading Spectres won the Australian Women's National Basketball League Championship

1985

- Lynette Woodard becomes the first woman to play for the Harlem Globetrotters.
- Old Dominion (31–3) won the NCAA Division I women's basketball tournament
- Cal Poly Pomona (26-7) won the NCAA Women's Division II Basketball Championship
- Scranton (31-1) won the NCAA Women's Division III Basketball Championship
- Victoria Vikes won the Bronze Baby, awarded to the Canadian Interuniversity Sport winner in women's basketball
- Coburg Cougars won the Australian Women's National Basketball League Championship

1986

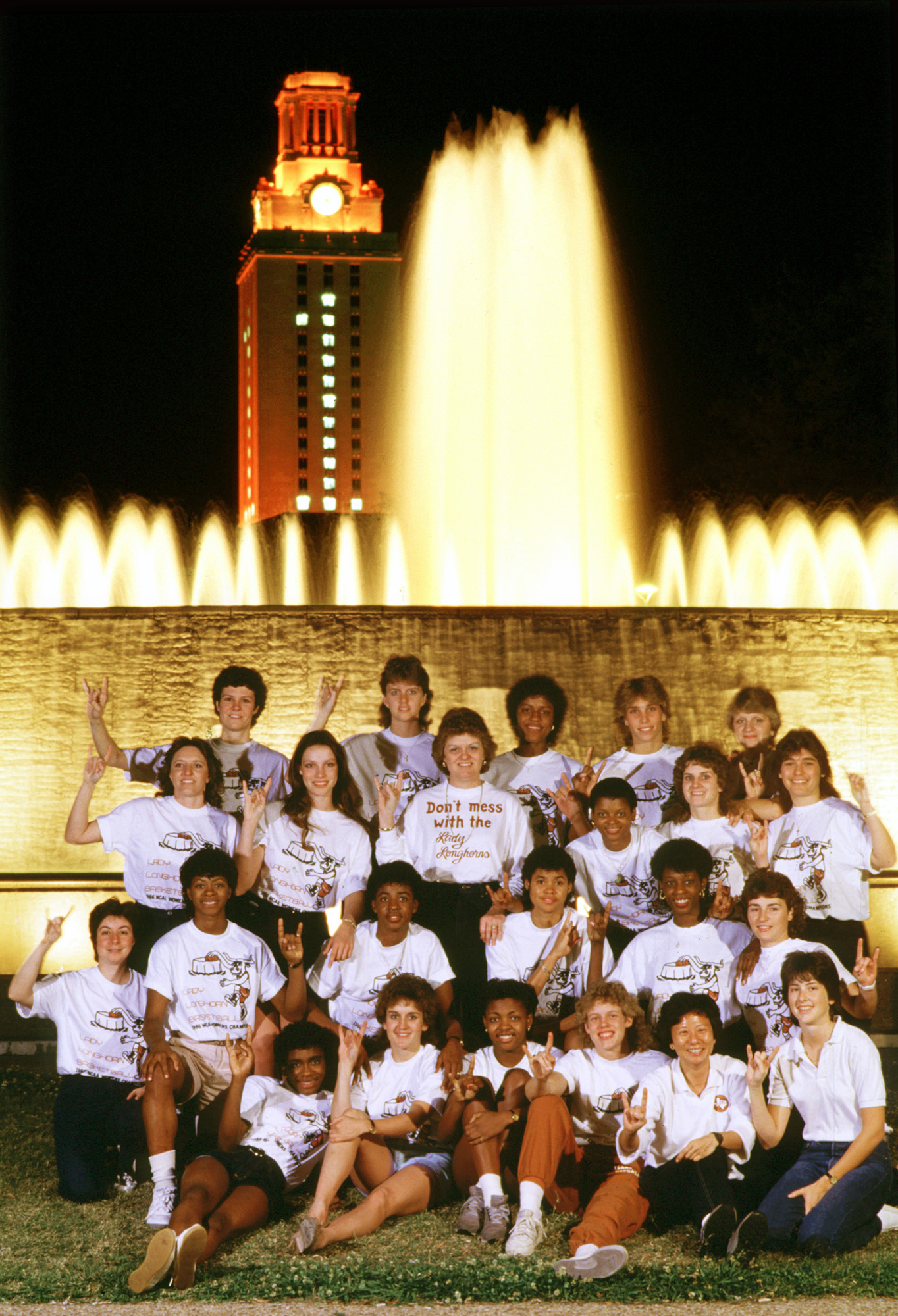
Texas, the 1986 National Championship team, in front of the main tower, lit up with #1

- Texas (34–0) won the NCAA Division I women's basketball tournament, completing the first undefeated season in NCAA Division I history.
- Cal Poly Pomona (30-3) won the NCAA Women's Division II Basketball Championship
- Salem State (29-1) won the NCAA Women's Division III Basketball Championship
- Toronto Varsity Blues won the Bronze Baby, awarded to the Canadian Interuniversity Sport winner in women's basketball
- Nunawading Spectres won the Australian Women's National Basketball League Championship
- RULE Change—The alternating possession arrow is first used, although a jump ball is still used at the beginning of the game, and the beginning of overtime. Coaches must stay within coaching box, and only the head coach may stand while the ball is live
- FIBA World Championship for Women

Gold—USA
Silver—Soviet Union
Bronze—Canada

1987

- RULE Change—The three-point field goal is introduced for any field goal completed when shot beyond a line set at 19 feet, and 9 inches from the center of the basket.
- Tennessee (28-6) won the NCAA Division I women's basketball tournament
- New Haven (29-2) won the NCAA Women's Division II Basketball Championship
- Wisconsin–Stevens Point (27-2) won the NCAA Women's Division III Basketball Championship
- Victoria Vikes won the Bronze Baby, awarded to the Canadian Interuniversity Sport winner in women's basketball
- Nunawading Spectres won the Australian Women's National Basketball League Championship

1988

- Olympic competition for women

Gold—USA
Silver—Yugoslavia
Bronze—Soviet Union

- Louisiana Tech (32–2) won the NCAA Division I women's basketball tournament
- Hampton (33-1) won the NCAA Women's Division II Basketball Championship
- Concordia-Moorhead (29-2) won the NCAA Women's Division III Basketball Championship
- Manitoba Bisons won the Bronze Baby, awarded to the Canadian Interuniversity Sport winner in women's basketball
- Nunawading Spectres won the Australian Women's National Basketball League Championship

1989

- Tennessee (35–2) won the NCAA Division I women's basketball tournament
- Delta State (30-4) won the NCAA Women's Division II Basketball Championship
- Elizabethtown (29-2) won the NCAA Women's Division III Basketball Championship
- Calgary Dinos won the Bronze Baby, awarded to the Canadian Interuniversity Sport winner in women's basketball
- Nunawading Spectres won the Australian Women's National Basketball League Championship

1990

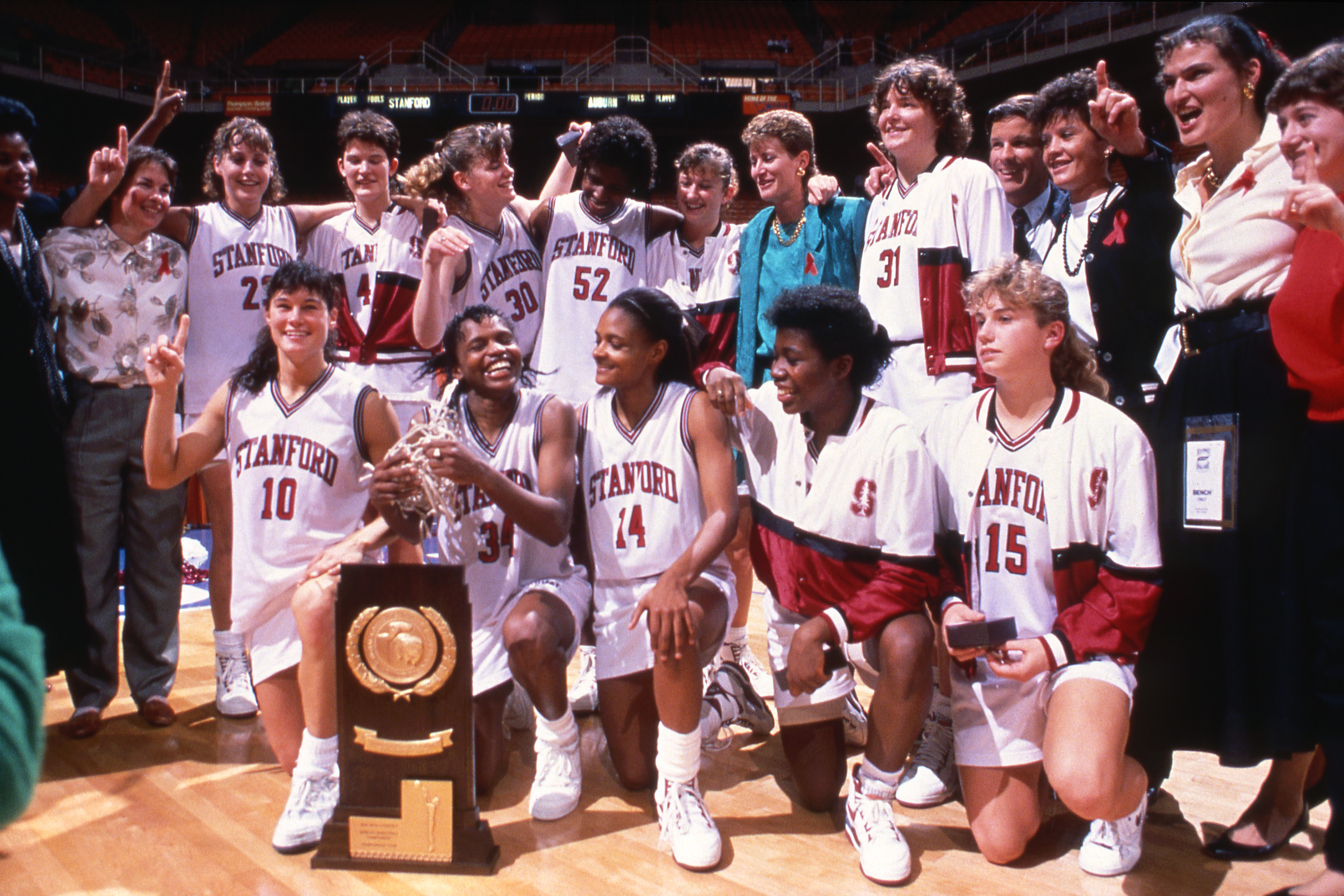
Stanford Cardinal team with National Championship Trophy

- Stanford (32–1) won the NCAA Division I women's basketball tournament
- Delta State (32-1) won the NCAA Women's Division II Basketball Championship
- Hope (24-2) won the NCAA Women's Division III Basketball Championship
- Laurentian Lady Vees won the Bronze Baby, awarded to the Canadian Interuniversity Sport winner in women's basketball
- North Adelaide Rockets won the Australian Women's National Basketball League Championship
- FIBA World Championship for Women

Gold—USA
Silver—Yugoslavia
Bronze—Cuba

== 1991–2000 ==
1991

- Tennessee (30–5) won the NCAA Division I women's basketball tournament
- North Dakota State (31-2) won the NCAA Women's Division II Basketball Championship
- St. Thomas (MN) (29-2) won the NCAA Women's Division III Basketball Championship
- Laurentian Lady Vees won the Bronze Baby, awarded to the Canadian Interuniversity Sport winner in women's basketball
- Hobart Islanders won the Australian Women's National Basketball League Championship

1992

- Olympic competition for women

Gold—Commonwealth of Independent States (CIS)
Silver—China
Bronze—USA

- Stanford (30–3) won the NCAA Division I women's basketball tournament
- Delta State (30-4) won the NCAA Women's Division II Basketball Championship
- Alma (24-3) won the NCAA Women's Division III Basketball Championship
- Victoria Vikes won the Bronze Baby, awarded to the Canadian Interuniversity Sport winner in women's basketball
- Perth Breakers won the Australian Women's National Basketball League Championship

1993

- Texas Tech (31-3) won the NCAA Division I women's basketball tournament
- North Dakota State (30-2) won the NCAA Women's Division II Basketball Championship
- Central (IA) (24-5) won the NCAA Women's Division III Basketball Championship
- Winnipeg Wesmen won the Bronze Baby, awarded to the Canadian Interuniversity Sport winner in women's basketball
- Sydney Flames won the Australian Women's National Basketball League Championship
- The WBA (Women's Basketball Association) plays its first official game on its way to three seasons of Women's Professional Basketball.

1994

- FIBA World Championship for Women

Gold—Brazil
Silver—China
Bronze—Cuba

- North Carolina (33-2) won the NCAA Division I women's basketball tournament
- North Dakota State (27-5) won the NCAA Women's Division II Basketball Championship
- Capital (30-1) won the NCAA Women's Division III Basketball Championship
- Winnipeg Wesmen won the Bronze Baby, awarded to the Canadian Interuniversity Sport winner in women's basketball
- Adelaide Lightning won the Australian Women's National Basketball League Championship

1995

- Connecticut (35–0) won the NCAA Division I women's basketball tournament
- North Dakota State (32-0) won the NCAA Women's Division II Basketball Championship
- Capital (33-0) won the NCAA Women's Division III Basketball Championship
- Winnipeg Wesmen won the Bronze Baby, awarded to the Canadian Interuniversity Sport winner in women's basketball
- Adelaide Lightning won the Australian Women's National Basketball League Championship

1996

- Olympic competition for women

Gold—USA
Silver—Brazil
Bronze—Australia

- Tennessee (32-4) won the NCAA Division I women's basketball tournament
- North Dakota State (30-2) won the NCAA Women's Division II Basketball Championship
- Wisconsin-Oshkosh (31-0) won the NCAA Women's Division III Basketball Championship
- Manitoba Bisons won the Bronze Baby, awarded to the Canadian Interuniversity Sport winner in women's basketball
- Adelaide Lightning won the Australian Women's National Basketball League Championship
- The WNBA is founded, with eight initial teams. Sheryl Swoopes is the first player signed.
- The American Basketball League (ABL) formed, a professional basketball league for women in the United States. It lasted two full seasons, and suspended operations in the third.

1997

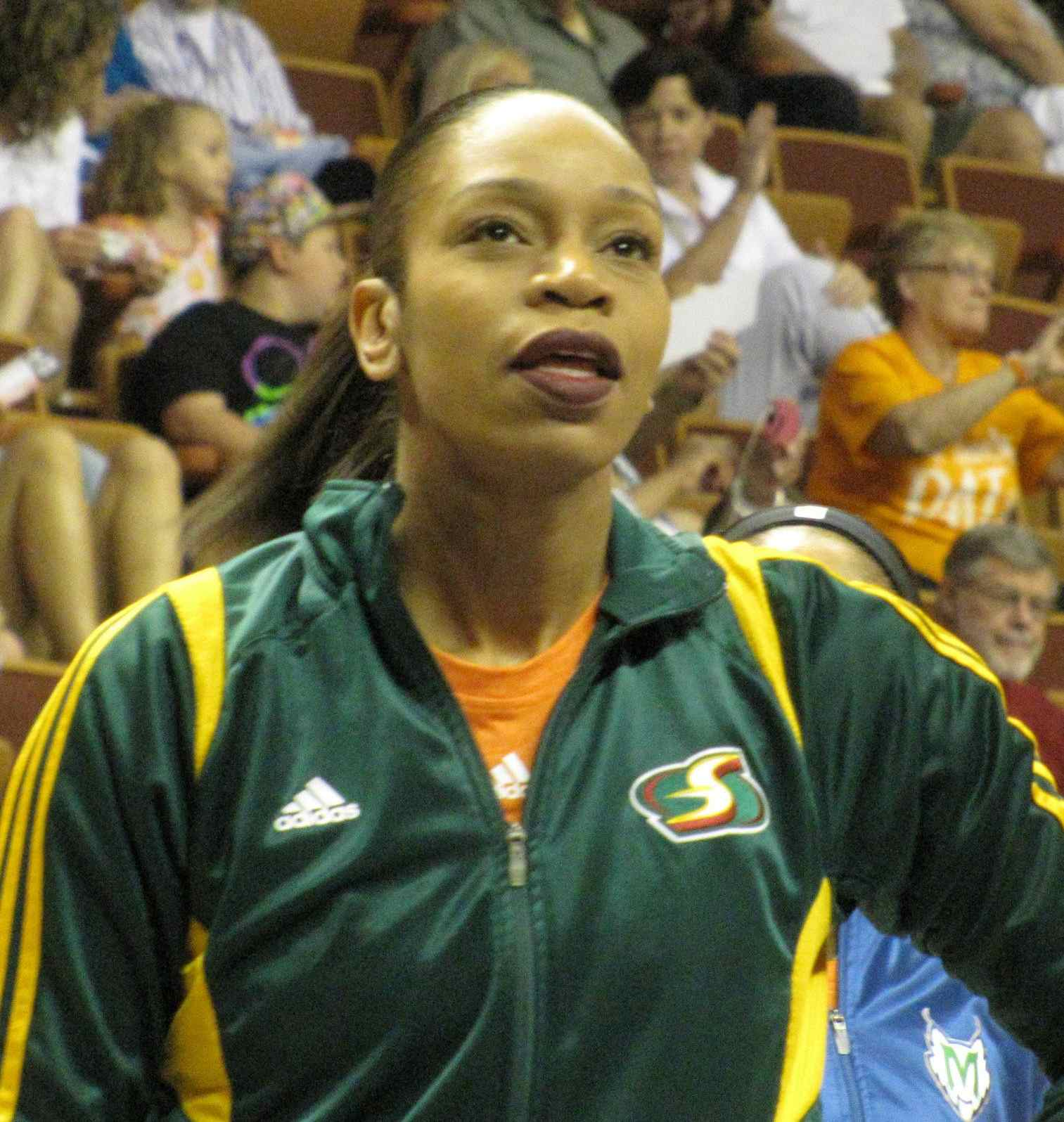
Tina Thompson, first player chosen in the WNBA draft

- Tennessee (29–10) won the NCAA Division I women's basketball tournament
- North Dakota (28-4) won the NCAA Women's Division II Basketball Championship
- NYU (29-1) won the NCAA Women's Division III Basketball Championship
- Manitoba Bisons won the Bronze Baby, awarded to the Canadian Interuniversity Sport winner in women's basketball
- Sydney Flames won the Australian Women's National Basketball League Championship
- First WNBA draft, with Tina Thompson as the first player selected. The first game is held on 21 June 1997, between the New York Liberty and the Los Angeles Sparks. The Liberty won 67–57.
- The Houston Comets win the first WNBA Championship.
- Trent Tucker Rule adopted by WNBA.

1998

- Tennessee (39-0) won the NCAA Division I women's basketball tournament
- North Dakota (31-1) won the NCAA Women's Division II Basketball Championship
- Washington (MO) (28-2) won the NCAA Women's Division III Basketball Championship
- Victoria Vikes won the Bronze Baby, awarded to the Canadian Interuniversity Sport winner in women's basketball
- Adelaide Lightning won the Australian Women's National Basketball League Championship
- FIBA World Championship for Women

Gold—USA
Silver—Russia
Bronze—Australia

- The Houston Comets won the WNBA Championship.

1999

- Purdue (34–1) won the NCAA Division I women's basketball tournament
- North Dakota (31-1) won the NCAA Women's Division II Basketball Championship
- Washington (MO) (30-0) won the NCAA Women's Division III Basketball Championship
- Alberta Pandas won the Bronze Baby, awarded to the Canadian Interuniversity Sport winner in women's basketball
- Australian Institute of Sport won the Australian Women's National Basketball League Championship
- The Houston Comets won the WNBA Championship.

2000

- Olympic competition for women

Gold—USA
Silver—Australia
Bronze—Brazil

- Connecticut (36–1) won the NCAA Division I women's basketball tournament
- Northern Kentucky (32-2) won the NCAA Women's Division II Basketball Championship
- Washington (MO) (30-0) won the NCAA Women's Division III Basketball Championship
- Victoria Vikes won the Bronze Baby, awarded to the Canadian Interuniversity Sport winner in women's basketball
- Canberra Capitals won the Australian Women's National Basketball League Championship
- First outdoor college basketball game: Tennessee defeats Arizona 67–63
- The Houston Comets won the WNBA Championship.

== 2001–2010 ==
2001

- Notre Dame (34–2) won the NCAA Division I women's basketball tournament
- Cal Poly Pomona (27–3) won the NCAA Women's Division II Basketball Championship
- Washington (MO) (28–2) won the NCAA Women's Division III Basketball Championship
- Regina Cougars won the Bronze Baby, awarded to the Canadian Interuniversity Sport winner in women's basketball
- Sydney Panthers won the Australian Women's National Basketball League Championship
- The LA Sparks won the WNBA Championship.

2002

- FIBA World Championship for Women

Gold—USA
Silver—Russia
Bronze—Australia

- Connecticut (39–0) won the NCAA Division I women's basketball tournament
- Cal Poly Pomona (28-4) won the NCAA Women's Division II Basketball Championship
- Wisconsin-Stevens Point (30–3) won the NCAA Women's Division III Basketball Championship
- Simon Fraser Clan won the Bronze Baby, awarded to the Canadian Interuniversity Sport winner in women's basketball
- Canberra Capitals won the Australian Women's National Basketball League Championship
- The first McDonald's All-American Game for girls is played at Madison Square Garden in New York City.
- The Los Angeles Sparks won the WNBA Championship.

2003

- Connecticut (37–1) won the NCAA Division I women's basketball tournament
- South Dakota State (32-3) won the NCAA Women's Division II Basketball Championship
- Trinity (Texas) (28-5) won the NCAA Women's Division III Basketball Championship
- Victoria Vikes won the Bronze Baby, awarded to the Canadian Interuniversity Sport winner in women's basketball
- Canberra Capitals won the Australian Women's National Basketball League Championship
- The Detroit Shock won the WNBA Championship.

2004

- Olympic competition for women

Gold—USA
Silver—Australia
Bronze—Russia

- Connecticut (31-4) won the NCAA Division I women's basketball tournament
- California (PA) (35-1) won the NCAA Women's Division II Basketball Championship
- Wilmington (Ohio) (27-6) won the NCAA Women's Division III Basketball Championship
- UBC Thunderbirds won the Bronze Baby, awarded to the Canadian Interuniversity Sport winner in women's basketball
- Dandenong Rangers won the Australian Women's National Basketball League Championship
- The Seattle Storm won the WNBA Championship.

2005

- Baylor (33–3) won the NCAA Division I women's basketball tournament
- Washburn (35-2) won the NCAA Women's Division II Basketball Championship
- Millikin (29-2) won the NCAA Women's Division III Basketball Championship
- Simon Fraser Clan won the Bronze Baby, awarded to the Canadian Interuniversity Sport winner in women's basketball
- Dandenong Rangers won the Australian Women's National Basketball League Championship
- The Sacramento Monarchs won the WNBA Championship.

2006

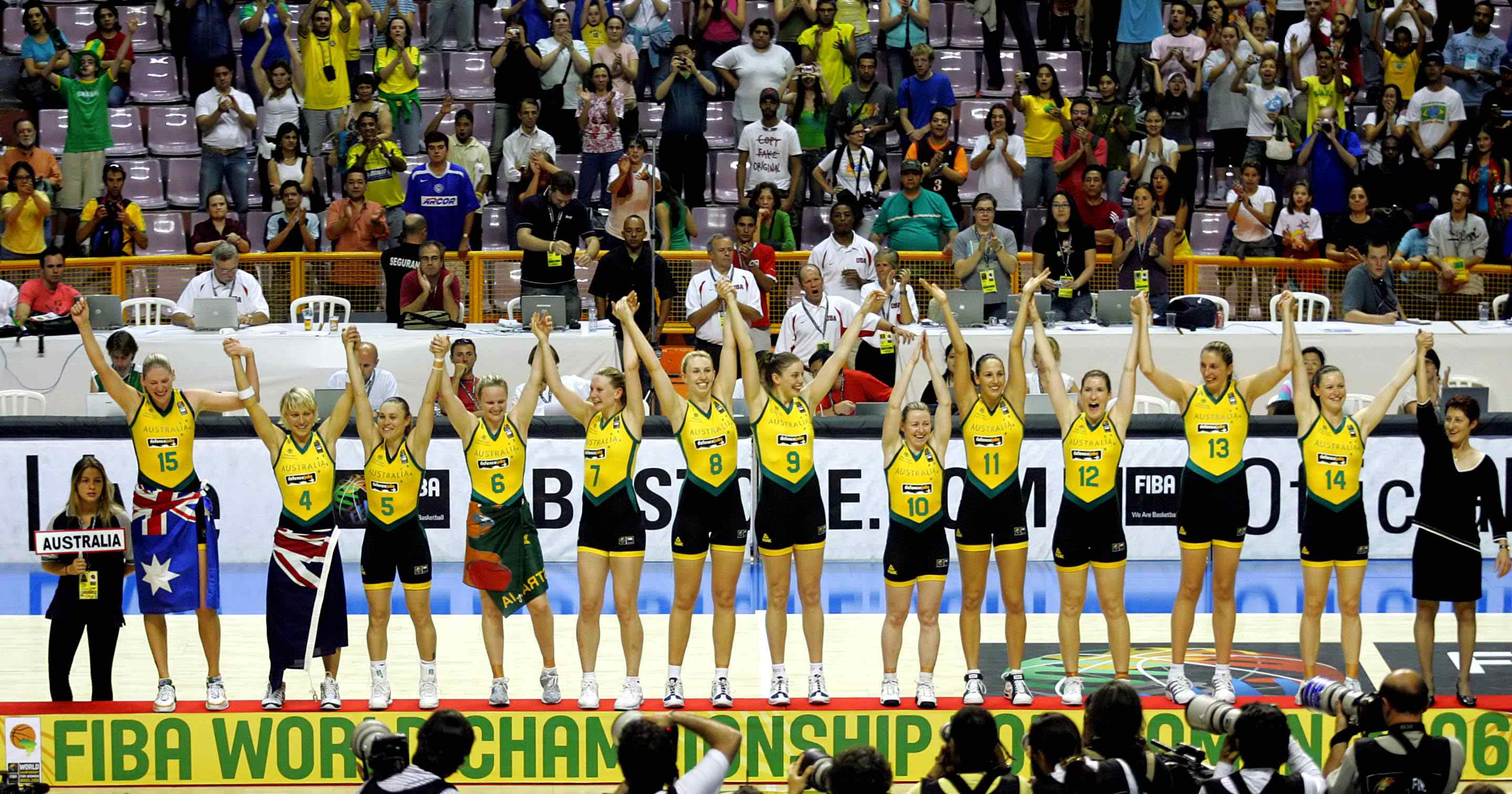
Australia women's national basketball team, celebrating after being awarded the gold medals for winning the 2006 FIBA World Championship for Women in basketball

- FIBA World Championship for Women

Gold—Australia
Silver—Russia
Bronze—USA

- Maryland (34-4) won the NCAA Division I women's basketball tournament
- Grand Valley State (33-3) won the NCAA Women's Division II Basketball Championship
- Hope (33-1) won the NCAA Women's Division III Basketball Championship
- UBC Thunderbirds won the Bronze Baby, awarded to the Canadian Interuniversity Sport winner in women's basketball
- Canberra Capitals won the Australian Women's National Basketball League Championship
- The Detroit Shock won the WNBA Championship.

2007

- Tennessee (34-3) won the NCAA Division I women's basketball tournament
- Southern Connecticut State (34-2) won the NCAA Women's Division II Basketball Championship
- DePauw (31-3) won the NCAA Women's Division III Basketball Championship
- Simon Fraser Clan won the Bronze Baby, awarded to the Canadian Interuniversity Sport winner in women's basketball
- Canberra Capitals won the Australian Women's National Basketball League Championship
- The Phoenix Mercury won the WNBA Championship.

2008

- Olympic competition for women

Gold—USA
Silver—Australia
Bronze—Russia

- Tennessee (36-2) won the NCAA Division I women's basketball tournament
- Northern Kentucky (28-8) won the NCAA Women's Division II Basketball Championship
- Howard Payne (33-0) won the NCAA Women's Division III Basketball Championship
- UBC Thunderbirds won the Bronze Baby, awarded to the Canadian Interuniversity Sport winner in women's basketball
- Adelaide Lightning won the Australian Women's National Basketball League Championship
- The Detroit Shock won the WNBA Championship.

2009

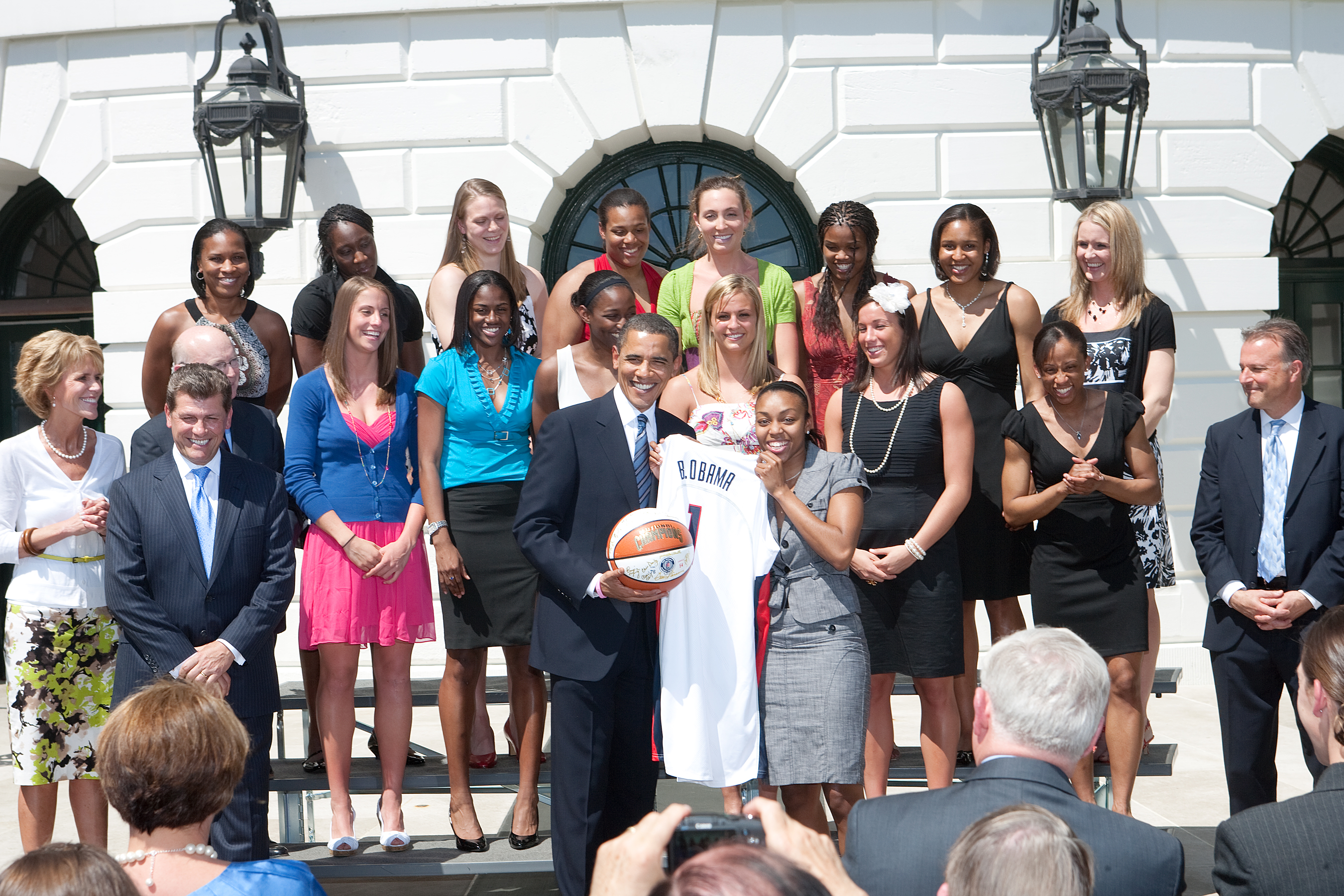
The players, coaches, and other staff of the 2008–2009 UConn Huskies, winners of the 2009 national championship

- Connecticut (39-0) won the NCAA Division I women's basketball tournament
- Minnesota State Mankato (32-2) won the NCAA Women's Division II Basketball Championship
- George Fox (32-0) won the NCAA Women's Division III Basketball Championship
- Simon Fraser Clan won the Bronze Baby, awarded to the Canadian Interuniversity Sport winner in women's basketball
- Canberra Capitals won the Australian Women's National Basketball League Championship
- The Phoenix Mercury won the WNBA Championship.

2010

- FIBA World Championship for Women

Gold—USA
Silver—Czech Republic
Bronze—Spain

- Trent Tucker Rule was adopted for FIBA women's play.
- Connecticut (39-0) won the NCAA Division I women's basketball tournament
- Connecticut had their 89th consecutive victory, one more than the all-time NCAA men's wins record of 88 held by UCLA; the streak ended at 90 wins.
- Emporia State (30-5) won the NCAA Women's Division II Basketball Championship
- Washington (MO) (29-2) won the NCAA Women's Division III Basketball Championship
- Simon Fraser Clan won the Bronze Baby, awarded to the Canadian Interuniversity Sport winner in women's basketball
- Canberra Capitals won the Australian Women's National Basketball League Championship
- The Seattle Storm won the WNBA Championship.

== 2011–2020 ==
2011

- Texas A&M (33-5) won the NCAA Division I women's basketball tournament
- Clayton State (35-1) won the NCAA Women's Division II Basketball Championship
- Amherst (32-1) won the NCAA Women's Division III Basketball Championship
- Windsor Lancers won the Bronze Baby, awarded to the Canadian Interuniversity Sport winner in women's basketball
- Bulleen Boomers won the Australian Women's National Basketball League Championship
- The story of the first of three consecutive AIAW national championships by Immaculata is made into a movie, released in 2011: The Mighty Macs
- The Minnesota Lynx won the WNBA Championship.

2012

- Olympic competition for women

Gold—USA
Silver—France
Bronze—Australia

- Baylor (40-0) won the NCAA Division I women's basketball tournament
- Shaw (29-6) won the NCAA Women's Division II Basketball Championship
- Illinois Wesleyan (28-5) won the NCAA Women's Division III Basketball Championship
- Windsor Lancers won the Bronze Baby, awarded to the CIS women's basketball champion.
- Dandenong Rangers won the Australian Women's National Basketball League Championship
- The Indiana Fever won the WNBA Championship.
- First women's game played on an aircraft carrier.

2013

- Connecticut (35–4) won the NCAA Division I women's basketball tournament
- Ashland (38–1) won the NCAA Women's Division II Basketball Championship
- DePauw (35–0) won the NCAA Women's Division III Basketball Championship
- Windsor Lancers won the Bronze Baby, awarded to the Canadian Interuniversity Sport winner in women's basketball
- Bendigo Spirit won the Australian Women's National Basketball League Championship
- Before the start of the 2013–14 season, the NCAA adopts the 10-second backcourt limit for the first time. Prior to this change, NCAA women's basketball was the only level of basketball in the world that did not have a backcourt possession time limit.
- The Minnesota Lynx won the WNBA Championship.

2014

- FIBA World Championship for Women

Gold—USA
Silver—Spain
Bronze—Australia

This was the last event known as the "FIBA World Championship for Women". Shortly after the 2014 edition, the competition was renamed the FIBA Women's Basketball World Cup.

- UConn (40–0), which had changed its official athletic brand name from "Connecticut" after the 2012–13 season, won the NCAA Division I women's basketball tournament
- Bentley (35–0) won the NCAA Women's Division II Basketball Championship.
- Fairleigh Dickinson-Florham (33–0) won the NCAA Women's Division III Basketball Championship
- Windsor Lancers won the Bronze Baby, awarded to the Canadian Interuniversity Sport winner in women's basketball
- Bendigo Spirit won the Australian Women's National Basketball League Championship
- On August 5, Becky Hammon, set to retire at the end of the 2014 WNBA season as a player with the San Antonio Stars, was hired as an assistant by the city's NBA team, the Spurs, effective with her retirement from play. Hammon became the first woman to be hired as a full-time coach in any of North America's four major professional leagues.
- The Phoenix Mercury won the WNBA Championship.

2015

- UConn (38–1) won the NCAA Division I women's basketball tournament
- California (PA) (32–4) won the NCAA Women's Division II Basketball Championship.
- Thomas More (33–0) won the NCAA Women's Division III Basketball Championship
- Windsor Lancers won the Bronze Baby, awarded to the Canadian Interuniversity Sport winner in women's basketball
- Townsville Fire won the Australian Women's National Basketball League Championship
- Effective with the 2015–16 season, the NCAA changed women's basketball from 20-minute halves to 10-minute quarters.
- Canada wins the gold medal at the 2015 Pan American Games
- The Minnesota Lynx won the 2015 WNBA finals

2016

- Olympic competition for women

Gold—USA
Silver—Spain
Bronze—Serbia

- The University of Saskatchewan Huskies (18–2) won the Bronze Baby, awarded to the Canadian Interuniversity Sport winner in women's basketball.
- The WNBL switches from a single game to a best of 3 finals
- Townsville Fire won the Australian Women's National Basketball League Championship
- With their eleventh championship win in 2016, the UConn Huskies (38–0) passed the UCLA Bruins men's team for most college basketball championships, and became the first Division 1 women's basketball team to win four straight national championships.
- Breanna Stewart was named the AP Player Of The Year (making her the first female college basketball player to win that award three times)
- Breanna Stewart was named the Most Outstanding Player of the Final Four (making her the first person to be most outstanding player of the Final Four four times)
- Lubbock Christian University (35–0) won the NCAA Division II Women's Basketball Championship
- Thomas More (33–0) won the NCAA Women's Division III Basketball Championship
- The Los Angeles Sparks won the WNBA Championship.

2017

- The UConn Huskies women's basketball team obtained the longest winning streak in college basketball (both men's and women's), 111 straight wins, which started with a win against Creighton on December 23, 2014, and continued for 111 games until March 31, 2017, when they were beaten 66–64 on a last second shot in overtime by Mississippi State in the 2017 NCAA Final Four. This streak included an undefeated season in 2015–16.
- McGill University (25–9) won the Bronze Baby, awarded to the women's basketball champion of the newly renamed U Sports.
- Sydney Uni Flames won the Australian Women's National Basketball League Championship
- South Carolina (33–4) won the NCAA Division I women's basketball tournament
- Ashland (37–0) won the NCAA Women's Division II Basketball Championship
- Amherst (33–0) won the NCAA Women's Division III Basketball Championship
- The Minnesota Lynx won the WNBA Championship.

2018

- Carleton won the Bronze Baby, awarded to the U Sports women's basketball champion.
- Townsville Fire won the Australian Women's National Basketball League Championship
- Notre Dame (35-3) won the NCAA Women's Division I Basketball Championship
- Central Missouri (30–3) won the NCAA Women's Division II Basketball Championship
- Amherst (33–0) won the NCAA Women's Division III Basketball Championship
- The Seattle Storm won the WNBA Championship.

2019

- McMaster won the Bronze Baby, awarded to the U Sports women's basketball champion.
- UC Capitals won the Australian Women's National Basketball League Championship
- Baylor (37–1) won the NCAA Division I women's basketball tournament
- Lubbock Christian (32–5) won the NCAA Women's Division II Basketball Championship.
- Thomas More (33–0) won the NCAA Women's Division III Basketball Championship.
- The Washington Mystics won the WNBA Championship.

2020

- Saskatchewan won the Bronze Baby, awarded to the U Sports women's basketball champion.
- UC Capitals won the Australian Women's National Basketball League Championship
- All NCAA postseason tournaments were canceled due to COVID-19.
- The Seattle Storm won the WNBA Championship.
- After Gregg Popovich was ejected in the second quarter in the Spurs' 121–107 loss to the Los Angeles Lakers on December 30, 2020, Becky Hammon became the first female acting head coach in NBA history.

== 2021–2030 ==
2021

- The first WNBA Commissioner's Cup, delayed from its originally planned 2020 launch due to COVID-19 issues, was held, with the Seattle Storm defeating the Connecticut Sun in the Cup final in Phoenix.
- The Bronze Baby championship was not held due to COVID-19 issues.
- Stanford (31–2) won the NCAA Division I women's basketball tournament
- Lubbock Christian (23–0) won the NCAA Women's Division II Basketball Championship.
- The NCAA Division III championship was canceled.
- Starting with the 2021–22 season, the three-point line in US college women's basketball was moved to the FIBA distance, a change that had been made in men's basketball for NCAA Division I in 2019–20 and other NCAA divisions in 2020–21.
- The Chicago Sky won the WNBA Championship.

2022

- The Mexican women's professional league (Liga Nacional de Baloncesto Profesional Femenil) was formed and played its first matches on 23 April
- NCAA championships:
  - Division I: South Carolina defeated UConn 64–49 in the championship game. This was UConn's first loss in 12 NCAA championship games.
  - Division II: Glenville State defeated Western Washington 85–72 in the championship game.
  - In the first Division III tournament since 2019, Hope defeated Wisconsin–Whitewater 71–58 in the championship game.
- The Las Vegas Aces won the WNBA Championship.

2023

- LSU defeated Iowa 102–85 to win the NCAA Division I championship.
- Ashland (37–0) defeated Minnesota Duluth 78–67 to win the NCAA Women's Division II Basketball Championship.
- Transylvania (33–0) defeated Christopher Newport 57–52 to win the NCAA Women's Division III Basketball Championship.
- Clarke defeated Thomas More 63–52 to win the NAIA championship.
- The Las Vegas Aces won the WNBA Championship.

2024

- Iowa's Caitlin Clark established the NCAA Division I all-time scoring record with 3,951 points. She also set the career mark for three-point field goals (548), and single-season marks for points (1,234), becoming the first player to lead the country three times, and three-pointers made (201).
- South Carolina defeated Iowa 87–75 to win the NCAA Division I championship, and the game established a ratings record for women's college basketball with an average of 18.9 million viewers (peaking at 24.1 million).
- Minnesota State (32–5) defeated Texas Woman's University 89–73 to win the NCAA Women's Division II Basketball Championship.
- NYU (31–0) defeated Smith 51–41 to win the NCAA Women's Division III Basketball Championship.
- Dordt defeated Providence (MT) 57–53 to win the NAIA championship.
- The New York Liberty won the WNBA Championship.

2025

- UConn defeated South Carolina to win the NCAA Women's Division I Basketball Championship. It was the 12th national championship for UConn.
- Grand Valley State (38–2) defeated Cal State Dominguez Hills 70–58 to win the NCAA Women's Division II Basketball Championship.
- NYU (31–0) defeated Smith 77–49 to win the NCAA Women's Division III Basketball Championship. It was the first ever championship rematch in NCAA D3 history.
- Dordt defeated Indiana Wesleyan 82–73 to win the 2025 NAIA championship.
- The Las Vegas Aces won the WNBA Championship.
- A'ja Wilson becomes the first person in WNBA history to win MVP, Finals MVP, Defensive Player of The Year, and a championship. This also marked her fourth MVP, the most of any WNBA player.

== See also ==
- Basketball
- History of basketball
- Saskatchewan Huskies
- Timeline of women's sports
- Women's basketball
