= Emma Larimore =

American educator, writer and editor (1855–1943)

- Born: Emma Page; September 14, 1855; Donelson, Tennessee
- Died: April 23, 1943; Santa Ana, California
- Occupation(s): Educator, writer, editor

Emma Page Larimore (September 14, 1855 – April 23, 1943) was an educator, writer, and editor for The Gospel Advocate. She was the second wife of Theophilus Brown Larimore (1843–1929).

== Biography ==
Emma Page was born in 1855 on a plantation near Donelson, Tennessee. She attended the Hope Institute run by Charlotte and Tolbert Fanning. She later studied at the Tennessee Normal School and Burritt College. Page began teaching at the Fanning Orphan School in 1884 when it was opened by Charlotte Fanning.

Page was an editor for The Gospel Advocate and authored the "Children's Corner" column. This column was aimed at young children, offering wisdom and encouragement on topics such as the death of siblings and parents. Page encouraged children to send her letters and included them in her column along with her sympathetic replies.

Emma Page is best known for recording, editing and publishing the sermons of T. B. Larimore. She did most of the editing of volume one when the original editor, Fletcher Douglas Srygley (1856–1900), fell ill. She alone completed volumes two and three. Between 1901 and 1903, Page had recorded many of Larimore's sermons for her own pleasure. The sales volume of the first book of sermons led to demand for more and the publisher of The Gospel Advocate engaged Page, who had the trust of Larimore, to transcribe, select, and arrange the contents of the second book published in 1904 and the third book published in 1910.

T. B. Larimore's first wife died in 1907 and he married Emma Page on January 1, 1911. The coupled traveled across North America for the next year, during which time they did evangelistic work. Emma Larimore wrote a book about these travels. T.B. Larimore's children were all married and so he and his wife were free to travel and pursue missionary work.

During 1912–1913, the Larimores moved to Gainesville, Florida, and worked at promoting the establishment of the Dixieland College. In 1920, T.B. Larimore became the pastor of the Christian Church in San Francisco, California. The Larimores settled into a new home in Berkeley, California. Emma's husband died in 1931, after which she completed the book, Life, Letters and Sermons of T.B. Larimore.

Emma Page Larimore died in Santa Ana, California in 1943.

== Works ==
- Larimore, Emma Page (1907). The life work of Mrs. Charlotte Fanning. Nashville, Tenn: McQuiddy printing Company.
- Larimore, Emma Page (1912). Our corner book: from Maine to Mexico, from Canada to Cuba. Nashville: Pub. House of the M.E. Church, South. WorldCat link
- Larimore, T. B., and Emma Page Larimore (1910). Letters and sermons of T.B. Larimore. Nashville, Tenn: McQuiddy Print. Co.WorldCat link
- Larimore, T. B., and Emma Page Larimore (1931). Life, letters and sermons of T.B. Larimore. Nashville, Tenn: Gospel Advocate Co. WorldCatlink
