= 2024 in basketball =

The following are the basketball events of the year 2024 throughout the world.

Tournaments included international (FIBA), professional (club) and amateur and collegiate levels.

== Basketball ==
=== FIBA World & Intercontinental Cups ===
- June 29 – July 7: 2024 FIBA Under-17 Basketball World Cup in Turkey
- July 13–21: 2024 FIBA Under-17 Women's Basketball World Cup in Mexico

=== FIBA Africa ===
- March 9 – June 1: 2024 BAL season

=== FIBA Europe ===
Clubs competitions

- October 5, 2023 – May 26: 2023–24 EuroLeague
- September 24, 2023 – April 26: 2023–24 Basketball Champions League
- October 3, 2023 – April 17: 2023–24 EuroCup Basketball

=== National Basketball Association ===
- October 24, 2023 – April 14: 2023–24 NBA season
- February 18: 2024 NBA All-Star Game at the Gainbridge Fieldhouse in Indianapolis, Indiana
  - All-Star Game: Eastern Conference defeats Western Conference 211 – 186.
  - Skills Challenge: Team Pacers (Tyrese Haliburton, Bennedict Mathurin, Myles Turner) (Indiana)
  - Three Point Contest: Damian Lillard (Milwaukee)
  - Slam Dunk Contest: Mac McClung (Osceola, G League)
- April 20: 2024 NBA Playoffs
- June 27: 2024 NBA draft
- November 12 - December 17: 2024 NBA Cup

=== Domestic league seasons ===
==== Men ====
===== Europe =====
Nation	Tournament	Champion	Runner-up	Result	Playoff format
Albania	2023–24 Albanian Basketball League				Best-of-7 series
Albania	2024 Albanian Basketball Cup				
Albania	2024 Albanian Basketball Supercup				
Armenia	2023–24 Armenia Basketball League A				
Austria	2023–24 Österreichische Basketball Bundesliga season				
Austria	2023–24 Austrian Basketball Cup				Single-game final
Austria	2024 Austrian Basketball Supercup				
Azerbaijan	2023–24 Azerbaijan Basketball League				
Belarus	2023–24 Belarusian Premier League				Best-of-5 series
Belgium	2024 BNXT League Belgian Playoffs				
Belgium	2023–24 Belgian Basketball Cup				Single-game final
Belgium	2024 Belgian Basketball Supercup				
Bosnia and Herzegovina	2023–24 Basketball Championship of Bosnia and Herzegovina				
Bosnia and Herzegovina	2023–24 Mirza Delibašić Cup				Single-game final
Bulgaria	2023–24 National Basketball League				Best-of-5 series
Bulgaria	2024 Bulgarian Basketball Cup				Single-game final
Croatia	2023–24 Favbet Premijer liga				
Croatia	2023–24 Krešimir Ćosić Cup				
Cyprus	2023–24 Cyprus Basketball Division A				Best-of-5 series
Cyprus	2023–24 Cypriot Basketball Cup				
Czech Republic	2023–24 NBL (Czech Republic)				Best-of-7 series
Czech Republic	2023–24 Czech Republic Basketball Cup				
Denmark	2023–24 Basketligaen				Best-of-7 series
Denmark	2023–24 Danish Basketball Cup				
England	2023–24 National Basketball League Division 1				
England	2023–24 National Basketball League Division 2				
England	2023–24 National Basketball League Division 3				
Estonia	2023–24 Estonian Championship				Best-of-5 series
Estonia	2024 Estonian Basketball Cup				Single-game final
Finland	2023–24 Korisliiga season				
Finland	2023–24 Finnish Basketball Cup				
France (Note: Includes one team from Monaco.)	2023–24 Pro A season				Best-of-5 series
France	2023–24 French Basketball Cup				
France	2024 Leaders Cup				
Georgia	2023–24 Georgian Superliga				
Germany	2023–24 Basketball Bundesliga				Best-of-5 series
Germany	2023–24 BBL-Pokal				Single-game final
Great Britain	2023–24 BBL				Single-game final
Great Britain	2023–24 BBL Cup				Single-game final
Great Britain	2023–24 BBL Trophy				Single-game final
Greece	2023–24 Greek Basket League				Best-of-5 series
Greece	2023–24 Greek Basketball Cup				Single-game final
Greece	2024 Greek Basketball Super Cup				
Hungary	2023–24 Nemzeti Bajnokság I/A				
Hungary	2024 Magyar Kupa				
Iceland	2023–24 Úrvalsdeild karla				
Iceland	2023–24 Icelandic Basketball Cup				
Ireland	2023–24 Super League				
Israel	2023–24 Israeli Basketball Premier League				Best-of-3 series
Israel	2023–24 Israeli Basketball State Cup				SIngle-game final
Israel	2024 Israeli Basketball League Cup				
Italy	2023–24 LBA				
Italy	2024 Italian Basketball Cup				
Italy	2024 Italian Basketball Supercup				
Kosovo	2023–24 Kosovo Basketball Superleague				
Kosovo	2023–24 Kosovo Basketball Cup				
Latvia	2023–24 Latvian Basketball League				Best-of-7 series
Lithuania	2023–24 LKL season				Best-of-5 series
Lithuania	2023–24 King Mindaugas Cup				
Luxembourg	2023–24 Total League season				
Moldova	2023–24 Moldovan National Division				
Montenegro	2023–24 Prva A liga				
Montenegro	2023–24 Montenegrin Basketball Cup				
Netherlands	2024 BNXT League Dutch Playoffs				Best-of-5 series
Netherlands	2023–24 Dutch Basketball Cup				Single-game final
Netherlands	2024 Dutch Basketball Supercup				
North Macedonia	2023–24 Macedonian First League				
North Macedonia	2023–24 Macedonian Basketball Cup				
Norway	2023–24 BLNO season				
Poland	2023–24 PLK season				Best-of-7 series
Poland	2024 Polish Basketball Cup				
Poland	2024 Polish Basketball Supercup				
Portugal	2023–24 LPB season				
Portugal	2023–24 Portuguese Basketball Cup				Single-game final
Portugal	2023–24 Portuguese Basketball League Cup				Single-game final
Portugal	2023–24 Portuguese Basketball Super Cup				Single-game final
Romania	2023–24 Liga Națională				
Romania	2024 Romanian Basketball Cup				
Scotland	2023–24 Scottish Basketball Championship				
Scotland	2023–24 Scottish Cup				Single-game final
Serbia	2023–24 Basketball League of Serbia				Best-of-3 series
Serbia	2023–24 Radivoj Korać Cup				Single-game final
Slovakia	2023–24 Slovak Basketball League				
Slovakia	2023–24 Slovak Basketball Cup				
Slovenia	2023–24 Slovenian Basketball League				
Slovenia	2023–24 Slovenian Basketball Cup				
Slovenia	2024 Slovenian Basketball Supercup				
Spain (Note: Includes one team from Andorra.)	2023–24 ACB season				Best-of-5 series
Spain	2024 Copa del Rey de Baloncesto				Single-game final
Spain	2024 Supercopa de España de Baloncesto				Single-game final
Sweden	2023–24 Basketligan season				
Sweden	2023–24 Superettan				
Switzerland	2023–24 SBL				
Switzerland	2023–24 SBL Cup				
Turkey	2023–24 Basketbol Süper Ligi				Best-of-5 final

===== Americas =====
Nation	Tournament	Champion	Runner-up	Result	Playoff format
Canada; United States	Basketball Super League (North America)	London Lightning	KW Titans	3-1	Best-of-three playoff
Canada	2024 CEBL season	Niagara River Lions	Vancouver Bandits	97-95	Single-game Final
Paraguay	2024 National Basketball League season				
United States (Note: The NBA and the G League each include one team from Canada, and the G League also includes one team from Mexico.)	2023–24 NBA season	Boston Celtics	Dallas Mavericks	4-1	Best-of-seven playoff
United States	2023–24 NBA G League season	Oklahoma City Blue	Maine Celtics	2–1	Best-of-three playoff
United States	2024 NBA Summer League	Miami Heat	Memphis Grizzlies	120-118 (OT)	Single-game Final
United States	2024 NBA Cup	Milwaukee Bucks	Oklahoma City Thunder	97–81	Single-game Final

=== College/university seasons ===
==== Men's ====
Nation	League / Tournament	Champions	Runners-up	Result	Playoff format
Canada	2024 U Sports Men's Basketball Championship	Laval Rouge et Or	Queen's Gaels	77–71	Single-game final
Philippines	UAAP Season 86	De La Salle Green Archers	UP Fighting Maroons	2–1	Best-of-3 series
United States	NCAA Division I	UConn Huskies	Purdue Boilermakers	75–60	Single-game final
United States	National Invitation Tournament	Seton Hall Pirates	Indiana State Sycamores	79–77	Single-game final
United States	NCAA Division II	Minnesota State Mavericks	Nova Southeastern Sharks	88–85	Single-game final
United States	NCAA Division III	Trine Thunder	Hampden-Sydney Tigers	69–61	Single-game final
United States	NAIA	Freed–Hardeman Lions	Langston Lions	71–67	Single-game final

==== Women's ====
Nation	League / Tournament	Champions	Runners-up	Result	Playoff format
Canada	2024 U Sports Women's Basketball Championship	Carleton Ravens	Saskatchewan Huskies	70–67	Single-game final
Philippines	UAAP Season 86	UST Growling Tigresses	NU Lady Bulldogs	2–1	Best-of-3 series
United States	NCAA Division I	South Carolina Gamecocks	Iowa Hawkeyes	87–75	Single-game final
United States	Women's Basketball Invitation Tournament	Illinois Fighting Illini	Villanova Wildcats	71–57	Single-game final
United States	NCAA Division II	Minnesota State Mavericks	Texas Woman's Pioneers	89–73	Single-game final
United States	NCAA Division III	NYU Violets	Smith Pioneers	51–41	Single-game final
United States	NAIA	Dordt Defenders	Providence Argos (Note: This team represents the University of Providence in Montana, not the much better-known Providence College, an NCAA Division I institution in Rhode Island's capital.)	57–53	Single-game final

== Basketball 3x3 ==
=== International Cups ===
- March 27–31: 2024 FIBA 3x3 Asia Cup in Singapore
- August 22–25: 2024 FIBA 3x3 Europe Cup in (Austria) Vienna
- September 11–15: 2024 FIBA 3x3 U23 World Cup in (Mongolia) Ulaanbaatar

=== 2024 FIBA 3x3 World Tour ===
- April 27–28: #1 in (Japan) Utsunomiya
- May 31 – June 1: #2 in (France) Marseille
- June 8–9: #3 in (Mongolia) Ulaanbaatar
- June 22–23: #4 in (China) Chengdu
- July 6–7: #5 in (Canada) Edmonton
- August 16–17: #6 in (Switzerland) Lausanne
- August 31 – September 1: #7 in (Hungary) Debrecen
- September 21–22: #8 in (China) Shanghai
- October 6–7: #9 in (China) Wuxi
- October 19–20: #10 in Macau
- October 26–27: #11 in (United Arab Emirates) Abu Dhabi
- November 7–8: #12 in (Bahrain) Manama
- November 16–17: #13 in (China) Shenzhen
- November 23–24: #14 in Hong Kong
- December 1–15: Finals in TBD

== Deaths ==
- January 7 — Rick Duckett, 66, American college coach (Grambling State).
- March 12 — Einar Ólafsson, 96, Icelandic coach (ÍR (m), ÍR (w)).
- April 12 — Ruben Douglas, 44, American-Panamanian player.
- May 30 — Drew Gordon, 33, American NBA player (Philadelphia 76ers).
- July 15 — Joe Bryant, 69, American NBA player (Philadelphia 76ers, San Diego Clippers, Houston Rockets) and WNBA coach (Los Angeles Sparks).
- July 29 — Floyd Layne, 95, American EPBL player (Carbondale Celtics / Scranton Miners, Hazleton Hawks, Williamsport Billies) and college coach (CCNY).
- July 29 — Robert Moreland, 85, American college coach (Texas Southern).
- August 13 — Frank Selvy, 91, American NBA player (Milwaukee / St. Louis Hawks, Minneapolis / Los Angeles Lakers, New York Knicks) and college coach (Furman).
- August 20 — Al Attles, 87, American NBA player (Philadelphia / San Francisco Warriors), coach (San Francisco / Golden State Warriors) and executive (Golden State Warriors).
- September 30 – Dikembe Mutombo, 58, Congolese-American NBA player (Denver Nuggets, Atlanta Hawks, Philadelphia 76ers, Houston Rockets).
- October 24 – Amir Abdur-Rahim, 43, American college coach (Kennesaw State, South Florida).
- November 17 – John Ray Godfrey, 80, American college player (Abilene Christian).
- November 18 – Bob Love, 81, American NBA player (Cincinnati Royals, Milwaukee Bucks, Chicago Bulls, New York Nets, Seattle SuperSonics).
- November 30 – Lou Carnesecca, 99, American NBA coach (New Jersey Nets) and college coach (St. John's).
- December 2 – Don Ohl, 88, American NBA player (Detroit Pistons, Baltimore Bullets, St. Louis / Atlanta Hawks).
- December 12 – Ernie Beck, 93, American NBA player (Philadelphia Warriors, St. Louis Hawks, Syracuse Nationals).
- December 12 – Bill Mlkvy, 93, American NBA player (Philadelphia Warriors).
- December 16 – Dick Van Arsdale, 81, American NBA player (New York Knicks, Phoenix Suns), coach (Phoenix Suns) and executive (Phoenix Suns).
- December 17 – Jānis Timma, 32, Latvian player (BC Khimki, BC Zenit Saint Petersburg).
- December 18 – Frank Kendrick, 74, American NBA player (Golden State Warriors).
