= Drew Stutts =

American basketball coach

Current position
- Title: Assistant coach
- Team: North Alabama
- Conference: Atlantic Sun

Playing career
- 2007–2009: Northwest–Shoals CC
- 2009–2011: North Alabama

Coaching career (HC unless noted)
- 2010–2011: Mars Hill Bible School (assistant)
- 2011–2014: Corner School (AL)
- 2014–2017: Hewitt-Trussville HS (AL) (assistant)
- 2017–2018: Freed–Hardeman (assistant)
- 2018–2019: Chester County HS (TN)
- 2019–2026: Freed–Hardeman
- 2026–present: North Alabama (assistant)

Head coaching record
- Overall: 174–52 (.770)
- Tournaments: 18–3 (NAIA)

Accomplishments and honors

Championships
- 2 NAIA championship (2024, 2026); 2 MSC regular season (2024, 2026); 4 MSC tournament (2023–2026)

Awards
- NABC NAIA Coach of the Year (2026); MSC Coach of the Year (2026)

Drew Stutts is an American college basketball coach who is an assistant coach for North Alabama Lions men's basketball team.

== Early life and playing career ==
Stutts attended Mars Hill Bible School in Florence, Alabama. He played college basketball at Northwest–Shoals Community College and North Alabama.

== Coaching career ==
Stutts began his coaching career as an assistant coach at Mars Hill Bible School in 2010. After one season, he took a head coaching position at Corner School in Birmingham, Alabama. In 2014, Stutts left Corner to become an assistant coach and junior varsity head coach at Hewitt-Trussville High School. In 2017, he was hired as an assistant at NAIA Freed–Hardeman University. Stutts was hired as the head basketball coach at Chester County High School in Henderson, Tennessee after one season with Freed–Hardeman. He coached the team to a 19–10 record.

Stutts was hired as the head coach at Freed–Hardeman on April 18, 2019. The Lions went 32–7 during the 2023–24 season and won 2024 NAIA men's basketball tournament. Stutts coached Freed–Hardeman to a second national title in 2026. Stutts compiled a 174–52 record over seven seasons at FHU.

Stutts left Freed–Hardeman after being hired as an assistant at North Alabama on April 2, 2026.

== Head coaching record ==
Record table
Season	Team	Overall	Conference	Standing	Postseason
Freed–Hardeman (American Midwest Conference) (2019–2020)
2019–20	Freed–Hardeman	18–10	15–7		
Freed–Hardeman (Mid-South Conference) (2020–2026)
2020–21	Freed–Hardeman	15–9	9–7	T-5th	
2021–22	Freed–Hardeman	19–13	13–9		NAIA First Round
2022–23	Freed–Hardeman	25–9	16–6	2nd	NAIA Sweet 16
2023–24	Freed–Hardeman	32–7	10–2	1st	NAIA Champion
2024–25	Freed–Hardeman	30–6	8–4	3rd	NAIA Fab Four
2025–26	Freed–Hardeman	35–1	12–0	1st	NAIA Champion
Freed–Hardeman:		174–52 (.770)			
Total:		174–52 (.770)			
National champion Postseason invitational champion Conference regular season champion Conference regular season and conference tournament champion Division regular season champion Division regular season and conference tournament champion Conference tournament champion
