= Liga Nacional de Básquetbol (Paraguay) =

- Organising body: Confederación Paraguaya de Básquetbol
- Founded: 1937
- First season: 1937
- Country: Paraguay
- Number of teams: 8
- Level on pyramid: 1
- Current champions: Deportivo San José (19th title) (2026-Apertura)
- Most championships: Olimpia Kings (36 titles)

The Liga Nacional de Básquetbol (abbreviated LNB, and literally in English, "National Basketball League"), is the top-tier level of the Paraguayan basketball league system. As of 2025, eleven teams are participating in the league. The yearly winners of this league are considered the Paraguayan basketball champions. Because of this, the champion gets the right to play in the Liga Sudamericana de Baloncesto.

== History ==
Amidst the 2020 COVID-19 pandemic, it was announced that the Liga Nacional would return on 22 July 2020. Basket Paraguayo informed that all games would be played at the Polideportivo at the Secretaria Nacional de Deportes.

== Sponsorship and television ==
The main companies that sponsor the league are Coca-Cola and Amstel. Regarding coverage, the matches are made under the production of Teledeportes Producciones, and are televised live by Unicanal and Multicable Premium. Occasionally they are broadcast live on Unicanal Plus alternative signal from Unicanal.

== Format ==
=== Metropolitan Basketball League ===
The Metropolitan Basketball League of Paraguay (or Top Professional League) is the most important basketball championship. It is organized by the Paraguayan Basketball Confederation.

The Metropolitan League is held annually and its winners are considered metropolitan champions, with only teams from Asunción and its suburbs eligible to compete. It is also known as the Top 5 tournament as the division consists of 5 teams. Previously it was named Top 4, in 2010 it increased the number of participants to 5, and in 2011 it returned to 4. Since 2012 there are 6 participating teams.

The second division of this league is called Copa Comuneros.

=== National League ===
Clubs from other areas of the country have the right to participate in the National League, along with those that were the best in the Metropolitan Top Professional League of Asunción.

=== Super Champions Cup ===
At the end of the season the champions of both leagues (Metropolitan and National) used to play in the 'Champions Cup and the winner qualified to the South American Club Championship. Since 2017, the champions of the Apertura and Clausura tournaments compete to determine the Super Champion of Paraguay.

The winner is called campeon absoluto (absolute champion).

== 2025 LNB teams ==
The 11 teamw playing in the 2025 LNB season. Five are from Asunción's Metropolitan League.

Club	Venue	City
Ciudad Nueva	Polideportivo Luis Fernández	Asunción
Colonias Gold	Estadio Municipal Ka'a Poty	(Itapúa Department) Obligado
Deportivo Amambay	Estadio de la FBA	(Asunción) Pedro Juan Caballero
Deportivo Campoalto	Polideportivo del Comando Logístico	Asunción
Deportivo Central	Gimnasio de la Cooperativa Capiatá	Capiatá
Deportivo San José	Polideportivo León Condou	Asunción
Félix Pérez Cardozo	Polideportivo Efigenio Gonzalez	Asunción
Guaireña	Polideportivo Municipal de Paraguarí	(Paraguarí Department) Paraguarí
Olimpia Kings	Polideportivo ODD	Asunción
San Lorenzo	Polideportivo San Lorenzo	San Lorenzo
Sportivo Luqueño	Polideportivo Club de Leones	Luque

== List of Champions ==
- 1937 Olimpia
- 1938 Club Guaraní
- 1939 Rowing Club
- 1940 Club Guaraní
- 1941 Rowing Club
- 1942 Olimpia
- 1943 Olimpia (undefeated)
- 1944 Olimpia
- 1945 Rowing Club
- 1946 Olimpia
- 1947 Olimpia
- 1948 Olimpia
- 1949 Olimpia
- 1950 Olimpia
- 1951 Olimpia (undefeated)
- 1952 Olimpia (undefeated)
- 1953 Olimpia (undefeated)
- 1954 Olimpia
- 1955 Olimpia
- 1956 Olimpia
- 1957 Olimpia
- 1958 Libertad
- 1959 Olimpia
- 1960 Olimpia
- 1961 Club Nacional
- 1962 Cerro Porteño
- 1963 Ciudad Nueva
- 1964 Ciudad Nueva
- 1965 Ciudad Nueva
- 1966 Olimpia
- 1967 Ciudad Nueva
- 1968 Ciudad Nueva
- 1969 Ciudad Nueva
- 1970 Olimpia
- 1971 Olimpia
- 1972 Libertad
- 1973 Olimpia
- 1974 Ciudad Nueva and Libertad
- 1975 Ciudad Nueva
- 1976 Olimpia
- 1977 Libertad
- 1978 Olimpia
- 1979 Libertad
- 1980 Olimpia
- 1981 Olimpia
- 1982 Sol de América
- 1983 Sol de América
- 1984 Sol de América
- 1985 Ciudad Nueva
- 1986 Libertad
- 1987 Libertad
- 1988 Olimpia
- 1989 Rowing Club
- 1990 Libertad
- 1991 Deportivo San José
- 1992 Olimpia
- 1993 Deportivo San José
- 1994 Olimpia and Sol de América
- 1995 Sol de América
- 1996 Sol de América
- 1997 Deportivo San José
- 1998 Sol de América
- 1999 Sol de América
- 2000 Deportivo San José
- 2001 Deportivo San José
- 2002 Deportivo San José
- 2003 Deportivo San José and América of Pilar
- 2004 Deportivo San José
- 2005 Libertad
- 2006 Deportivo San José
- 2007 Sol de América
- 2008 Libertad
- 2009 Libertad
- 2010 Sol de América
- 2011 Sol de América
- 2012 Cerro Porteño
- 2013 Libertad
- 2014 Cerro Porteño
- 2015 Libertad
- 2016 Olimpia Kings

=== Apertura and Clausura format ===
- 2017A Olimpia Kings
- 2017C Olimpia Kings
- 2018A Olimpia Kings
- 2018C Deportivo San José
- 2019A Olimpia Kings
- 2019C Deportivo San José
- 2020 not held due to COVID-19
- 2021 Deportivo San José
- 2022A Deportivo San José
- 2022C Deportivo San José
- 2023A Deportivo San José
- 2023C Deportivo San José
- 2024A Deportivo San José
- 2024C Deportivo San José
- 2025A Olimpia Kings
- 2025C Olimpia Kings
- 2026A Deportivo San José

== Performance by club ==
=== Total ===
- Olimpia Kings 36 titles
- Deportivo San José 19 titles
- Sol de América 11 titles
- Libertad 9 titles
- Ciudad Nueva 9 titles
- Rowing Club 4 titles
- Club Guaraní 2 titles
- Cerro Porteño 2 title
- Nacional Asunción 1 title
- América de Pilar 1 title
- CNR El Mbiguá 1 title

=== Breakdown of titles ===
- Olimpia: 1937, 1942, 1943 undefeated, 1944, 1946, 1947, 1948, 1949, 1950, 1951 undefeated, 1952 undefeated, 1953 undefeated, 1954, 1955, 1956, 1957, 1959, 1960, 1966, 1970, 1971, 1973, 1976, 1978, 1980, 1981, 1988, 1992 and metropolitan 1994)
- Libertad: 13 absolute tournaments (1958, 1972, 1974, 1977, 1979, 1986, 1987, 1990, 2005, 2008, 2009, 2013 and 2015, single metropolitan tournament) and 8 short tournaments (metropolitan 2008 and 2009, National League 2009, metropolitan Top5 in 2010 and National League 2011, metropolitan Top 5 in 2013, National League 2013 and Apertura 2016)
- Sol de América: 11 absolute tournaments (1982, 1983, 1984, Integración 1994, 1995, 1996, 1998, 1999, 2007, 2010 and 2011) and 5 short tournaments (Apertura 2007, Supercopa 2007, Liga Nacional 2008 and 2010 and metropolitan 2011)
- San José: 9 absolute tournaments (1991, 1993, 1997, 2000, 2001, 2002, 2003, 2004 and 2006) and five short tournaments (metropolitan 2001, National League 2001, metropolitan Apertura 2006, metropolitan Clausura 2006 and metropolitan Clausura 2007)
- Ciudad Nueva: 9 (1963, 1964, 1965, 1967, 1968, 1969, 1974, 1975 and 1985)
- Rówing Club: 4 (1939, 1941, 1945 and 1989)
- Cerro Porteño: 3 absolute tournaments (1962, 2012 and 2014, single metropolitan tournament) and two short (metropolitan top 5 in 2012 and National League 2012)
- Guaraní : 2 (1938 and 1940)
- Nacional: 1 (1961)
- América de Pilar: 1 (2003 National League).

– Finals for absolute championship titles between winners of short tournaments, take place from 2007 (in 2006 San José conquered the two segments and an extra final was not necessary).

Source: aips-america.com (2016)

=== Records and statistics ===
- Only club won undefeated titles is Olimpia (4): 1943, 1951, 1952, 1953
- In 1974 Ciudad Nueva and Libertad were declared both champions
- Clubs that automatically won the absolute championships (double: Metropolitan + Nacional) in the same year before 2007:
  - Libertad 9 (1958, 1972, 1974, 1977, 1979, 1986, 1987, 1990, 2005)
  - Deportivo San José 9 (1991, 1993, 1997, 2000, 2001, 2002, 2003, 2004, 2006)
  - Sol de América 8 (1982, 1983, 1984, Integración 1994, 1995, 1996, 1998, 1999)
  - Cerro Porteño 1 (1962)
- Clubs that won the absolute Champions Cup (super cup: Metropolitan winners vs Nacional winners) after 2007:
  - Libertad 4 (2008, 2009, 2013, 2015)
  - Cerro Porteño 2 (2012, 2014)
  - Sol de América 3 (2007, 2010, 2011)
- Clubs with most absolute titles in total:
  - Libertad 13 (1958, 1972, 1974, 1977, 1979, 1986, 1987, 1990, 2005, 2008, 2009, 2013, 2015 (Note: 2015 was only Metropolitan championship but also an absolute as no Nacional League was played))
  - Sol de América 11 (1982, 1983, 1984, Integración 1994, 1995, 1996, 1998, 1999, 2007, 2010, 2011)
  - Deportivo San José 9 (1991, 1993, 1997, 2000, 2001, 2002, 2003, 2004, 2006)
  - Cerro Porteño 3 (1962, 2012, 2014 (Note: 2014 was only Metropolitan championship but also an absolute as no Nacional League was played))

== Finals ==
=== Metropolitan League ===
Season	Champion	Result	Runner-up
1994	Olimpia Asunción		
2001	Deportivo San José		
2006 Apertura	Deportivo San José	3-0	Libertad
2006 Clausura	Deportivo San José		
2007 Apertura	Club Sol de América		
2007 Clausura	Deportivo San José		
2008	Libertad	3-0	Club Sol de América
2009	Libertad	3-1	Club Sol de América
2010	Libertad		Olimpia Asunción
2011	Club Sol de América		Libertad
2012	Cerro Porteño	3-2	Libertad
2013	Libertad	3-0	Club Sol de América
2014	Cerro Porteño	3-0	Felix Perez Cardozo
2015	Libertad	3-1	Club Sol de América
2016 Apertura	Libertad	2-1	Sportivo Luqueno
2016 Clausura	Olimpia Kings	2-0	Libertad
2017 Apertura	Olimpia Kings	2-1	Libertad
2017 Clausura	Olimpia Kings	2-0	Deportivo San José
2018 Apertura	Olimpia Kings	3-1	Deportivo San José
2018 Clausura	Deportivo San José	3-2	Olimpia Asunción
2019 Apertura	Olimpia Asunción	3-1	Deportivo San José
2019 Clausura	Deportivo San José	3-1	Olimpia Kings

=== National League ===
Season	Champion	Result	Runner-up
1994	Club Sol de América		
2003	América de Pilar	2-1	Sacachispas de Encarnación
2004	Deportivo San José		
2005	Libertad		
2008	Libertad	4-3	Club Sol de América
2009	Libertad	4-0	Club Sol de América
2010	Club Sol de América		Olimpia Asunción
2011	Libertad	3-2	Club Sol de América
2012	Cerro Porteño	3-1	Club Sol de América
2013	Libertad	3-1	Club Sol de América

=== Champions Cup (2006-2016) ===
A Series etween the Metrpolitano and National champions for the absolute champion of the year. A Super Cup trophy with a ticket for the South American Club Championship. Finals started in 2007.

Year	Champion	Result	Runner-up
2006	Deportivo San José	no final	-
2007	Club Sol de América		
2008	Libertad	no final	-
2009	Libertad	no final	-
2010	Club Sol de América	3-2	Libertad
2011	Club Sol de América	3-0	Libertad
2012	Cerro Porteño	no final	-
2013	Libertad	no final	-
2015	Libertad	no final	-
2016	Olimpia Asunción		Libertad

- 2006: Deportivo San José won it automatically as winners of both Apertura and Clausura
- 2008, 2009, 2013: Libertad won it automatically as winners of both Metropolitan and National leagues.
- 2012: Cerro Porteño won it automatically as winners of both Metropolitan and National leagues.

=== LNB (2021-present) ===
Season	Champion	Result	Runner-up
2021	Deportivo San José	2-1	Libertad
2022 Apertura	Deportivo San José	3-0	Olimpia Kings
2022 Clausura	Deportivo San José	3-0	Olimpia Kings
2023 Apertura	Deportivo San José	3-1	Colonias Gold
2023 Clausura	Deportivo San José	3-2	Olimpia Kings
2024 Apertura	Deportivo San José	3-2	Olimpia Kings
2024 Clausura	Deportivo San José	3-1	Colonias Gold
2025 Apertura	Olimpia Kings	3-1	Deportivo San José
2025 Clausura	Olimpia Kings	3-2	Colonias Gold
2026 Apertura	Deportivo San José	3-0	Olimpia Kings

== Awards ==
=== MVP ===
Metropolitano

Season	Player	Team
2010	(Paraguay) Guillermo Araújo	Olimpia Asuncion
2012	(Paraguay) Víctor Ricardo "Richard" Ozuna (United States) James Penny	Cerro Porteno; Cerro Porteno
2013	(Paraguay) Alejandro Peralta	Libertad
2019 Clausura	(Paraguay) Gabriel Peralta	Libertad

LNB

Season	Player	Team
2021	(Paraguay) Ramon Sanchez	Deportivo San Jose
2022 Apertura	(Argentina) Juan Corbalan	Colonias Gold
2022 Clausura	(Argentina) Juan Corbalan	Colonias Gold

=== Finals MVP ===
Metropolitano

Season	Player	Team
2010	(Paraguay) Guillermo Araújo	Olimpia Asuncion
2012	(Paraguay) Víctor Ricardo "Richard" Ozuna	Cerro Porteno
2015	(Paraguay) Junior Peralta	Libertad
2018 Apertura	(United States) Walter Baxley	Olimpia Asuncion
2019 Clausura	(United States) Scott Rogers	Deportivo San Jose

LNB

Season	Player	Team
2021	(Paraguay) Javier Martinez	Libertad
2022 Apertura	(Paraguay) Ramon Sanchez	Deportivo San Jose
2022 Clausura	(Paraguay) Ramon Sanchez	Deportivo San Jose

== Topscorers ==
Metropolitano

Season	Player	Team	Points
2012	(Paraguay) Bruno Zanotti	Libertad	
2013	(Paraguay) Jose Fabio	Solde America	302
2016 Apertura	(Paraguay) Ramón Sanchez	Sportivo Luqueño	251
2016 Clausura	(Paraguay) Edgar "Titi" Riveros	Libertad	404
2018 Apertura	(Paraguay) Javier Martínez	Olimpia Asuncion	
2019 Clausura	(Paraguay) Gabriel Peralta	Libertad	20.6 (PPG)

LNB

Season	Player	Team	Points
2022 Apertura	(Argentina) Juan Corbalan	Colonias Gold	20.3 (PPG)
2022 Clausura	(Paraguay) Daniel Perez	Deportivo Campo Alto Asuncion	22.5 (PPG)

== Statistical leaders ==
=== Assists ===
Metropolitano

Season	Player	Team	Assists
2012	(Paraguay) Daniel Pérez	Libertad	
2013	(Paraguay) Carlos Valejos	Libertad	57
2019 Clausura	(Paraguay) Manuel Aponte	Libertad	4.1 (APG)

LNB

Season	Player	Team	Assists
2022 Apertura	(Paraguay) Javier Martínez	Olimpia Asuncion	4.6(APG)
2022 Clausura	(Argentina) Juan Corbalan	Colonias Gold	5.0 (APG)

=== Rebounds ===
Metropolitano

Season	Player	Team	Rebounds
2012	(Paraguay) José Fabio	Cerro Porteno	
2013	(Paraguay) Edison Ortiz	Libertad	62
2019 Clausura	(United States) Roquez Johnson	Olimpia	9.2 (RPG)

LNB

Season	Player	Team	Assists
2022 Apertura	(Paraguay) Victor Ramires	Mariscal Estigarribia	9.4(APG)
2022 Clausura	(Paraguay) Cristian de Leon	Ciudad Nueva	10.0 (RPG)

=== Steals ===
Metropolitano

Season	Player	Team	Steals
2012	(Paraguay) Daniel Pérez	Libertad	
2013	(Paraguay) Luis Ljubetic	Sol de America	31
2019 Clausura	(Paraguay) Carlos Luis Vallejos	Deportivo San Jose	2.1 (SPG)

LNB

Season	Player	Team	Assists
2022 Apertura	(Paraguay) Edgar Alvarenga	Mariscal Estigarribia	2.1(SPG)
2022 Clausura	(Paraguay) Daniel Perez	Deportivo Campo Alto Asuncion	1.9(SPG)

=== Blocks ===
Metropolitano

Season	Player	Team	Blocks
2012	(United States) Jamaal Levy	Libertad	
2019 Clausura	(United States) Roquez Johnson	Olimpia	0.8 (BPG)

LNB

Season	Player	Team	Assists
2022 Apertura	(Paraguay) Maxsuel Roque	Felix Perez	1.5 (BPG)
2022 Clausura	(Paraguay) Bruno Zanotti	Deportivo San Jose	0.8 (BPG)

== See also ==
- Liga Nacional de Básquetbol Femenino
- Paraguayan Basketball Federation

== Sources ==
- All champions
- Paraguayan Champions 1937-2003
