= Fletcher Srygley =

- Born: Fletcher Douglas Srygley; December 22, 1856; Northern Alabama, U.S.
- Died: August 2, 1900 (aged 43); Donelson, Tennessee, U.S.
- Resting place: Mount Olivet Cemetery; Nashville, Tennessee, U.S.
- Education: Mars Hill Academy
- Occupations: Preacher, writer, and controversialist in the American Restoration Movement

Fletcher Douglas Srygley (1856–1900) was a preacher, writer, and controversialist in the American Restoration Movement.

== Personal life ==
Srygley was born December 22, 1856, in northern Alabama to James H. and Sarah J. Srygley. He received very little education as a child, with the exception of his time at T. B. Larimore's Mars Hill Academy. The time studying under Larimore cemented a lifelong friendship which involved constant companionship, mutual public praise, and lengthy personal correspondence. Larimore, who preached at Srygley's funeral, wrote of him, "As a friend, neither Damon nor Pythias, David nor Jonathan, was ever truer than he." It was while under Larimore's tuteledge in 1874 that Srygley was baptized.

From Mars' Hill, Srygley began a career of itinerant preaching as was common among preachers in the Restoration Movement. His preaching style appealed primarily to poor, agrarian audiences, and because of this he often worked for little or no pay. Srygley continued in this work, reasoning that it was those who could least afford it who most direly needed good preaching.

Srygley died on August 2, 1900, at his home in Donelson, TN. He is buried in the Mount Olivet Cemetery in Nashville, Tennessee.

== Writer and Editor ==
Srygley's greatest contributions to the Restoration Movement were not his sermons but his editorials for various restorationist papers. After his death, it was commented that "powerful, because honest earnest, intellectual, sincere, scriptural, and logical, in the pulpit, he was more and most potential in wielding the pen. He was a clear, concise, convincing writer. To say he was peerless in his specific sphere is to speak the simple truth in disparagement of none." Srygley was noted in his writings for his wry wit and controversial, often aggressive nature. While his writings touched on the full scope of the issues facing the movement in the late 19th century, his main focus was on the constitution of the New Testament Church.

Srygley wrote for a time for the Old Path Guide, a religious paper owned and edited by F. G. Allen. The Kentucky paper was founded in order to occupy a moderate ground between the extreme liberal and conservative papers which dominated in the North and South following the Civil War. Thus, when the controversial issue of missionary societies erupted in the church, Srygley wrote on the side of moderation and refused to condemn the societies.

Poor health eventually required Srygley to move from Kentucky to Tennessee where in 1889 he became a front page editor for the Gospel Advocate. The Gospel Advocate, under the editorship of David Lipscomb, was the leading paper in the conservative wing of the southern movement which would eventually become known as the Churches of Christ. Thus, Srygley found his views about missionary societies espoused while he wrote for the Old Path Guide challenged. Srygley refused, when asked, to write against missionaries societies, promising only to investigate the matter biblically and then speak his conscience. In the end, he concluded that missionary societies were wrong and spent the rest of his career opposing them.

In addition to his work in the Restoration papers, Syrgley worked to write or compile a number of religious books. His hope had been to write a work on the New Testament church, but his untimely death prevented this.

== Works ==
- Biographies and Sermons: A Collection of Original Sermons by Different Men, With a Biographical Sketch of Each Man
- Larimore and His Boys a.k.a. Smiles and Tears
- Letters and Sermons of T. B. Larimore
- Seventy Years in Dixie: Recollections and Sayings of T. W. Caskey and Others
