= 2024 Paraguayan National Basketball League season =

2024 National Basketball League season
- League: Liga Nacional de Básquetbol
- Season: 2024
- Duration: April 15, 2024 –
- Teams: 7

Records
- Biggest home win: Olimpia Kings 102-45 Sol de América (April 22, 2024)
- Biggest away win: Sol de América 56-105 Colonias Gold (April 20, 2024)

Seasons
- ← 2023 2025 →
- All statistics correct as of 25 April 2024.

The 2024 Paraguayan National Basketball League season will consist of two tournaments: the Apertura and the Clausura. The Apertura tournament began on April 15, 2024, with a round-robin format.

== Competition system ==
Like the previous season, the 7 teams will play all against all in two rounds, the 4 best positioned teams advance to the Final Four where they will compete against each other again, then the 2 best positioned teams will advance to the Finals.

== Teams ==
Club	Stadium	Location
Ciudad Nueva	Polideportivo Luis Fernández	Asunción
Colonias Gold	Estadio Municipal Ka'a Poty	(Itapúa Department) Obligado
Deportivo San José	Polideportivo León Condou	Asunción
Féliz Pérez Cardozo	Polideportivo Efigenio Gonzalez	Asunción
Libertad	Polideportivo Tigo La Huertita	Asunción
Olimpia Kings	Polideportivo ODD	Asunción
Sol de América	Polideportivo Luis Oscar Giagni	Asunción

== Apertura tournament ==
This tournament, officially the Torneo Apertura homenaje a Osvaldo Dominguez Dibb (Apertura Tournament tribute to Osvaldo Dominguez Dibb) in honor of the leader of Club Olimpia who died in February 2024, started on April 15 with 7 participating teams who will play all against all in two rounds:

=== Regular round ===
==== Standings ====
Pos	Team	Pld	W	L	PF	PA	PD	Pts	Qualification or relegation
1	Deportivo San José	4	4	0	388	298	+90	8	Semifinals
2	Colonias Gold	4	2	2	329	295	+34	6	Semifinals
3	Féliz Pérez Cardozo	3	2	1	225	202	+23	5	Semifinals
4	Libertad	4	1	3	279	321	−42	5	Semifinals
5	Olimpia Kings	3	2	1	265	202	+63	5	
6	Sol de América	3	1	2	182	287	−105	4	
7	Ciudad Nueva	3	0	3	211	274	−63	3	

Updated to match(es) played on 25 April 2024. Source: www.cpb.com.py
