= Liga Nacional de Básquetbol Femenino =

- Organising body: Paraguayan Basketball Confederation
- Country: Paraguay
- Confederation: FIBA Americas
- Number of clubs: 6
- Level on pyramid: 1

The Liga Nacional de Básquetbol Femenino (LNBF) (English: Women's National Basketball League), is the top-tier level women's professional basketball league in Paraguay. Its tournaments have been held annually since 1949 (with only 11 interruptions), and it is organized by the Paraguayan Basketball Confederation.

In some years the absolute champion was defined in a final between the winners of the Apertura and Clausura tournaments, in the event that the same club had not managed to win both tournaments, in which case it automatically won the absolute title. In previous years, the absolute title was obtained by the winner of the Copa de Campeones, which was contested between the champions of the Top Profesional Metropolitano and the Liga Nacional.

Since 2017, it was established that each championship (Apertura and Clausura) will be considered an absolute title and there will be two champions per year. After the COVID-19 pandemic, it was played annually again.

== Teams ==
=== 2024 Season ===
6 teams participate in the 2024 LNBF season.

- Ciudad Nueva
- Colonias Gold
- Deportivo San José
- Félix Pérez Cardozo
- Olimpia Queens
- Sol de América

== Winners list ==
From its inception until the 2016 season there was only one absolute champion per year. Since the 2017 season, each title (Apertura/Clausura) is considered an absolute title, so there are two champions per year.

First Division
Edition	Year	Champion
1	1949	Libertad
2	1950	Libertad
3	1951	Libertad
4	1952	Guaraní
5	1953	Ciudad Nueva
6	1954	Ciudad Nueva
7	1955	Ciudad Nueva
8	1956	Ciudad Nueva
9	1957	Ciudad Nueva
10	1958	Olimpia
11	1959	Ciudad Nueva
12	1960	Olimpia
13	1961	Ciudad Nueva
14	1962	Cerro Porteño
15	1963	Cerro Porteño
16	1964	Cerro Porteño
17	1965	Cerro Porteño
18	1966	Cerro Porteño
19	1967	Cerro Porteño
20	1968	Guaraní
21	1969	Guaraní
22	1970	Guaraní
#	1971	Not held
23	1972	Olimpia
24	1973	Guaraní
25	1974	Guaraní
26	1975	Guaraní
27	1976	Félix Pérez Cardozo
28	1977	Félix Pérez Cardozo
29	1978	Félix Pérez Cardozo
30	1979	Félix Pérez Cardozo
31	1980	Félix Pérez Cardozo
32	1981	Félix Pérez Cardozo
33	1982	Félix Pérez Cardozo
#	1983 - 1990	Not held
34	1991	Olimpia
#	1992	Not held
35	1993	Olimpia
#	1994	Not held
36	1995	Olimpia
#	1996 - 1997	Not held
37	1998	Olimpia
#	1999	Not held
38	2000	Club Área 4
39	2001	Universidad Autónoma de Asunción
40	2002	Olimpia
41	2003	Deportivo San José
42	2004	Olimpia
43	2005	Olimpia
44	2006	Sol de América
45	2007	Olimpia
46	2008	Sol de América
47	2009	Olimpia
48	2010	Olimpia
49	2011	Olimpia
50	2012	Libertad
51	2013	Sol de América
52	2014	Libertad
53	2015	Sol de América
54	2016	Sol de América
55	2017-Apertura	Olimpia
56	2017-Clausura	Sol de América
57	2018-Apertura	Sol de América
58	2018-Clausura	Sol de América
59	2019-Apertura	Sol de América
60	2019-Clausura	Sol de América
#	2020	Not held
61	2021	Félix Pérez Cardozo
#	2022	Not held
62	2023	Félix Pérez Cardozo

Short tournaments
Year	Tournament	Champion
2007	Apertura	Olimpia
2007	Clausura	Sol de América
2011	Top Profesional	Olimpia
2011	Liga Nacional	Olimpia
2012	Top Profesional	Libertad
2012	Liga Nacional	Libertad
2015	Apertura	Sol de América
2015	Clausura	Sol de América
2016	Apertura	Sol de América
2016	Clausura	Sol de América

== Titles by club ==
Club	Tiles	Year
Olimpia	15	1958, 1960, 1972, 1991, 1993, 1995, 1998, 2002, 2004, 2005, 2007, 2009, 2010, 2011, A2017
Sol de América	10	2006, 2008, 2013, 2015, 2016, C2017, A2018, C2018, A2019, C2019
Félix Pérez Cardozo	10	1976, 1977, 1978, 1979, 1980, 1981, 1982, 1983, 2021, 2023
Guaraní	7	1952, 1968, 1969, 1970, 1973, 1974, 1975
Ciudad Nueva	7	1953, 1954, 1955, 1956, 1957, 1959, 1961
Cerro Porteño	6	1962, 1963, 1964, 1965, 1966, 1967
Libertad	5	1949, 1950, 1951, 2012, 2014
Deportivo San José	1	2003
Universidad Autónoma de Asunción	1	2001
Club Área 4	1	2000

== See also ==
- Liga Nacional de Básquetbol (Men)
- FIBA Americas
