= Paraguayan Basketball Confederation =

Paraguayan Basketball Confederation Confederación Paraguaya de Básquetbol
- Sport: Basketball
- Jurisdiction: Paraguay
- Abbreviation: CPB
- Founded: 1947; 79 years ago
- Affiliation: FIBA
- Affiliation date: FIBA: 1947; 79 years ago FIBA Americas: 1947; 79 years ago
- Regional affiliation: FIBA Americas
- Headquarters: Luque
- Location: Parque Olímpico, Bloque J
- President: Santiago Occhipinti

Official website
- www.cpb.com.py
- (Paraguay)

The Paraguayan Basketball Confederation (in Spanish: Confederación Paraguaya de Básquetbol) is the governing body of basketball in Paraguay. The PBF organizes the Liga Nacional de Básquetbol (LNB) and Liga Nacional de Básquetbol Femenino (LNBF), and runs Paraguay's men's national basketball team as well as the women's national basketball team.

== History ==
In 1936, no governing body of basketball existed in Paraguay, so basketball was part of the Paraguayan Sports Association until 1947, the year in which the Paraguayan Basketball Federation was founded. That same year, it joined the International Basketball Federation (FIBA).
