= Mars Hill Bible School =

Private Christian day school in Alabama, US

Coordinates: 34°50′48″N 87°39′34″W

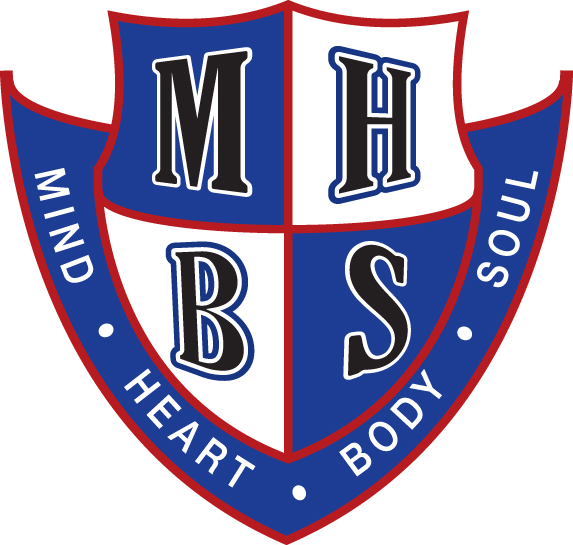

Location
- 698 Cox Creek Parkway; Florence, Alabama 35630; United States

Information
- Type: Private
- Established: 1871 (155 years ago)
- Founder: T. B. Larimore
- CEEB code: 011130
- NCES School ID: 00000973
- President: Dr. Laws Rushing II
- Teaching staff: 37.5 (FTE)
- Grades: PK-12
- Enrollment: 650
- Student to teacher ratio: 11.2
- Campus: 50 acres (200,000 m^{2})
- Colors: Blue and white
- Mascot: Panthers
- Accreditation: Cognia/NCSA
- Website: www.mhbs.org

Mars Hill Bible School is a private, college preparatory Christian day school for boys and girls located in Florence, Alabama. The school begins at pre-kindergarten and continues through the twelfth grade. The school also operates a pre-school.

== History ==
Mars Hill Academy, the predecessor of today's school was opened by Theophilus Brown Larimore in 1871. He drew the name "Mars Hill" from the New Testament book of Acts (17:22) Then Paul stood in the midst of Mars' hill... He later changed the name to Mars Hill College. The academy and college operated for 16 years teaching hundreds of young men and women. Larimore offered a diverse curriculum of classes including business writing, rhetoric and Latin as well as advanced studies in the Bible. Many of his students became preachers that established numerous congregations around the area. The college was closed in 1887 in order for Larimore to spend more time preaching. F.D. Srygley wrote a biography on Larimore and the school titled, "Smiles and Tears, Larimore and His Boys", which details the life of the school and early preaching of Larimore.

Mars Hill Bible School in 1947, a group of Christians in the Shoals area agreed on the need to re-establish a Christian school to provide an education grounded in the eternal truths of Scripture. T.B. Larimore's son, Virgil, agreed to sell a portion of the property for the realization of this dream, and plans began in earnest. A local physician, W.W. Alexander purchased and donated the land. M.S. Killen and Charlie Morris provided the school's equipment and fleet of buses. Irven Lee served as the school's first president.

The doors of Mars Hill Bible School opened to students on September 15, 1947. This first new class included 13 seniors, 18 juniors, 25 sophomores, 24 freshmen, 35 eighth graders, 42 sixth graders, 30 fourth graders, 25 second graders, and 50 first graders, for a total of almost 400 students in its inaugural year.

The Alabama State Department of Education accredited the school in its initial year. The year also brought the school's first play, “Lavender and Old Lace"; its first chorus program, conducted with over 50 members; first church presentation, held at the Poplar Street Church of Christ (now Wood Avenue); and first yearbook, The Mizpah.

Mars Hill Bible School has continued to build on the legacy established in these formative years. Though over 750 students currently attend Mars Hill for preschool through grade 12, the mission of Mars Hill Bible School remains unchanged. Over 140 years later, The school still abides by the powerful words once spoken by T.B. Larimore: “We loved one another, and love ruled the school.”

== Academics ==
MHBS has been awarded the "Excellence in Education Award" on 3 occasions. In 2016 the school received an overall score of 306.15 from Cognia which is a national school accreditation agency. Their score was above the agency's network average of 278.34 The Honors Diploma, one of 4 offered diplomas, requires 28 credits that include Bible, English, Social Studies, Humanities, Science, Mathematics, Computer Science, Foreign Language, Health and Physical Education. To receive this diploma, students must maintain a 90.0 or higher cumulative average.

The Dual-Enrollment program in partnership with Northwest–Shoals Community College allows students to take college classes on the MHBS campus. This is possible because MHBS offers a block schedule that mimics college schedules and allows time for juniors and seniors to take college classes while still in high school. MHBS also offers the Early-Scholar Program which allows students to take courses at the University of North Alabama during the day. The timing of the block schedule and the close proximity to the UNA campus allows students the time to commute. The school also conducts ACT preparation for their high school students.

A strong spiritual emphasis is placed on academics with daily Bible class being part of the mandatory course load for all students. Daily chapel attendance is also required to begin each day where the students sing worship songs, read scripture and hear short devotional talks. The schools seeks to give students a Biblical worldview which is described on the website as "a comprehensive educational paradigm that reflects the truth of God, predicament of mankind, and hopeful destiny in Christ."

== Arts and Sciences ==
Mars Hill features multiple arts and sciences programs including multiple band programs, chorus, VEX Robotics, and show choir. The band program is currently directed by Cameron Hall. The program was started in 1988, with Steve Howard as the director. In 2020, Mars Hill began their Rhythm in Blue Marching Band program under Joey Krieger. The school also features a Jazz Band. Mars Hill’s VEX robotics program is headed by Morgan Snodgrass, and the school hosts an annual competition titled “Bots on the Hill”. The high school chorus program is directed by Gary Russell, and J.J. Davenport is in charge of elementary music, show choir, and drama. The school also has a yearly show choir performance for grades 9-12, and both band and chorus students can participate. Both the band and chorus programs are for students in grades 5th-12th, however, elementary students do take a music class to set foundations in learning about music from an early age. Students in grades 5-7 take an art class once a week during their band or chorus periods, and in 8th grade, they can choose to take art full-time. The art program is headed by Jamie Banks.

== Athletics ==
Mars Hill competes in the Alabama High School Athletic Association in the 2A classification. Their nickname is the "Panthers". The school has won 21 Alabama High School Athletic Association championships, with five in baseball (including 1977, 1978, 2010, 2012 and 2019), one in boys’ basketball, seven in girls' basketball, one in boys' golf, one in boys’ cross country, two in girls' track and field, one in girls' softball, and three in football. The Panthers' Football program began in 2009 and was built into a Varsity program over the period of a couple of years. On August 21, 2014, Mars Hill played their first varsity football game against the Sheffield Bulldogs. After making their way into the 2A Playoffs in the 2017-18 season, the Panthers defeated the Linden Patriots at Jordan-Hare Stadium to claim its first state championship in Football. In 2020, they defeated Abbeville for their second championship, and in December 2024, the Panthers played against the Houston Academy Raiders at Protective Stadium to claim their third football state championship title.

- Men's sports
  - Football
  - Baseball
  - Basketball
  - Cross country
  - Forensics Squad
  - Fishing
  - Golf
  - Soccer
  - Track and field
- Women's sports
  - Basketball
  - Cross country
  - Forensics Squad
  - Golf
  - Soccer
  - Softball
  - Tennis
  - Track and field
  - Volleyball

== Notable alumni ==
Name	Class year	Notability	Reference(s)
Thomas Burrows	2013	Professional baseball player currently in the Atlanta Braves organization.	
Fletcher Srygley	c. 1870	Preacher, writer, and controversialist in the American Restoration Movement.	
Drew Stutts	2007	College basketball coach	
Josh Willingham	1997	Professional baseball player.	
