= Deportivo San José =

- League: Men: Liga Nacional de Básquetbol; Women: Liga Nacional de Básquetbol Femenino
- Arena: Polideportivo León Coundou
- Capacity: 3,200
- Location: Asunción, Paraguay
- Team colors: Light blue and white.

Deportivo San José is a Paraguayan basketball club based in Asunción. The men's team plays in the Liga Nacional de Básquetbol while the women's one plays in the Liga Nacional de Básquetbol Femenino, both of them are the premier basketball league in the country. San José has won the men's league eighteen times, its last title being the Clausura 2023. San José trails only Olimpia Kings in league titles, as the team has won a record 32.

== History ==
The club was founded for students of the Colegio San José. In 1965, San José won its first title when they won the Paraguayan 6th-level league. In 1966, they entered the main league and never left the top flight again. In 1968, a basketball court was opened.

== Honours ==
Liga Nacional de Básquetbol

- Champions (18): 1991, 1993, 1997, 2000, 2001, 2002, 2003, 2004, 2016, 2018 C, 2019 C, 2021, 2022 A, 2022 C, 2023 A, 2023 C, 2024 A, 2024 C.

Liga Nacional de Básquetbol Femenino

- Champions (1): 2003.

== Players ==
=== 2023 roster ===
Note: Flags indicate national team eligibility at FIBA-sanctioned events. Players may hold other non-FIBA nationalities not displayed.

Deportivo San José roster
Players
Coaches

Pos.	No.	Nat.	Name	Ht.	Wt.	Age
C	1	(Paraguay)	Benitez, Franco	2.00 m (6 ft 7 in)		31 – 12 November 1994
F	3	(Paraguay)	Ochipinti, Vincenzo	1.85 m (6 ft 1 in)		26 – 13 October 1999
PG	4	(Argentina)	Paletta, Nicolas	1.81 m (5 ft 11 in)		38 – 14 November 1987
SG	7	(Dominican Republic)	Morillo Lajara, Nehemias	1.96 m (6 ft 5 in)		33 – 21 August 1992
SF	8	(Paraguay)	Riveros, Edgar	1.84 m (6 ft 0 in)		34 – 2 April 1991
F	9	(Paraguay)	Gomez, Mariano	1.95 m (6 ft 5 in)		30 – 16 December 1995
F	10	(Paraguay)	Peralta, Alejandro	1.95 m (6 ft 5 in)		34 – 17 April 1991
SF	12	(Paraguay)	Dose, Fernando	2.00 m (6 ft 7 in)		31 – 16 July 1994
C	13	(Argentina)	Hure, Daniel	2.01 m (6 ft 7 in)		41 – 8 January 1985
C	14	(Paraguay)	Juarez, Alen	2.01 m (6 ft 7 in)		25 – 16 October 2000
PF	16	(Paraguay)	Sanchez, Ramon	1.90 m (6 ft 3 in)		35 – 10 January 1991
C	30	(United States)	Wood, Jeremiah	2.02 m (6 ft 8 in)		41 – 25 January 1985

Head coach

- Alberto Cano

Legend

- (C) Team captain
- Injured

- Roster
Updated: 1 August 2023
