= Charlotte Fall Fanning =

British-American educator

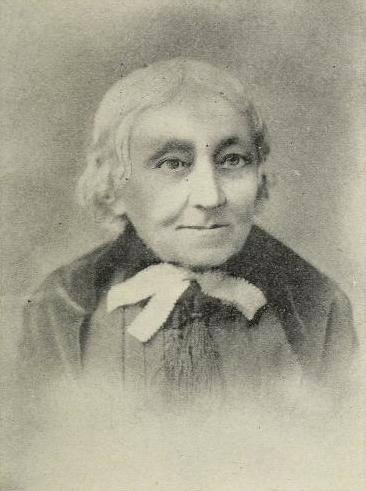
- Born: Charlotte Fall; April 10, 1809; London, England
- Died: August 15, 1896 (aged 87); Nashville, Tennessee
- Occupation: Educator
- Years active: Tolbert Fanning (1836-1874; his death)

Charlotte Fall Fanning (April 10, 1809 – August 15, 1896) worked with her husband Tolbert Fanning to organize and run a series of schools. Ten years after Tolbert's death she opened the Fanning Orphan School.

Charlotte Fall was born near London, England. Her family moved to the United States when she was nine years old. After their parents died, her older brother took charge of the family, including their academic and religious education. Fall began her teaching career at the Nashville Female Academy.

Fall married Tolbert Fanning, a widower, on December 25, 1836. They moved to Franklin, Tennessee, where they ran a school for three years, from 1837 to 1839. Next they opened a school at Elm Craig near Nashville which they operated for two years. Then Charlotte and Tolbert went on an evangelism tour through the South.

They returned to Franklin and in 1845 opened Franklin College, operated by Tolbert, and an associated female school operated by Charlotte. Although technically separate schools, the men and women took part in some common sessions. The schools were closed during the American Civil War from 1861 to 1865. Shortly after reopening, a fire destroyed several buildings. The Fannings purchased nearby Minerva College and renamed it Hope Institute. They ran this school until Tolbert's death in 1874.

In 1884, she opened the Fanning Orphan School, something she and Tolbert had always planned to do. After selecting a board of trustees, Charlotte deeded the school to them in 1884. Charlotte Fanning led classes there until a short time before she died on August 15, 1896, aged 87.
