= 2024 NAIA men's basketball tournament =

- Teams: 64
- Finals site: Municipal Auditorium, Kansas City, Missouri
- Champions: Freed–Hardeman (1st title, 1st title game, 5th Fab Four)
- Runner-up: Langston (1st title game)
- Semifinalists: College of Idaho Yotes; Grace Lancers
- Coach of the year: Drew Stutts (Freed–Hardeman)
- Player of the year: Elijah Malone (Grace)
- Charles Stevenson Hustle Award: J.J. Wheat (Freed–Hardeman)
- Chuck Taylor MVP: Hunter Scurlock (Freed–Hardeman)

The 2024 NAIA men's basketball tournament was a tournament held by the NAIA to determine the national champion of men's college basketball among its member programs in the United States and Canada, culminating the 2023–24 NAIA men's basketball season.

The tournament finals were played at the Municipal Auditorium in Kansas City, Missouri.

Freed–Hardeman won the title, the Lions' first NAIA national overall.

== Qualification ==
For the second year, the tournament field consisted of 64 teams.

Furthermore, the championship continued to utilize a simple single-elimination format.

The first two preliminary rounds were played on one of sixteen regional campus sites while the four final rounds, including the national championship, were played at the NAIA's long-time final tournament site in Kansas City, Missouri.

== See also ==
- 2024 NAIA women's basketball tournament
- 2024 NCAA Division I men's basketball tournament
- 2024 NCAA Division II men's basketball tournament
- 2024 NCAA Division III men's basketball tournament
