= Larimore House =

Historic building

- U.S. National Register of Historic Places
- Location within Alabama Location within the United States
- Location: Mars Hill Road, Florence, Alabama, U.S.
- Coordinates: 34°50′49″N 87°39′36″W
- Area: 1 acre (0.40 ha)
- Built: 1870
- Built by: Theophilus Brown Larimore
- Architectural style: Victorian
- NRHP reference No.: 74000416
- Added to NRHP: November 21, 1974

The Larimore House was a historic residence and school in Florence, Alabama that was home to Theophilus Brown Larimore (died March 18, 1929), an influential Christian evangelist in the United States. The house was listed on the National Register of Historic Places in 1974.

== History ==
The house was built as a residence for Theophilus Brown Larimore, and served as the center of a school, known as Mars Hill College. The school operated from 1871 until 1887, and Larimore lived in the house until his first wife's death in 1907. His son, Virgil, lived in the house until 1946, when it was acquired by the Lauderdale County Bible School, which opened in the house in 1947. The school's name changed to Mars Hill Bible School in 1951. In the following years, new buildings were built to house the school. The Larimore Home continued to be a fixture and symbol of the school, which hosted special events and weddings. On the night of July 19, 2018, the Larimore Home was intentionally set on fire by an arsonist. Only a few items of T.B. Larimore's were saved, and only a burned structure was left. In the following months, Restoration Experts determined the home could not be restored. In February 2019, the home was torn down. Only a historical marker remains where it once stood.

== Architecture and fittings ==
The house featured Victorian influences, and had a nearly full-width, double-height veranda across the façade, supported by six square columns. The front entrance was flanked by pairs of four-over-four sash windows with Gothic-influenced arched tops; the windows were repeated on each side of the house. The upper floor has single six-over-six sashes. The house had a center-hall plan with two rooms on either side of a central hall on each floor. Two interior chimneys lead to six fireplaces with hand-carved mantels.

== See also ==
- National Register of Historic Places listings in Lauderdale County, Alabama
