= 2024 NCAA Division II women's basketball tournament =

- Teams: 64
- Finals site: St. Joseph Civic Arena, St. Joseph, Missouri
- Champions: Minnesota State Mavericks (2nd title)
- Runner-up: Texas Woman's Pioneers (1st title game)
- Semifinalists: Cal State San Marcos Cougars (1st Final Four); Ferris State Bulldogs (1st Final Four)
- Winning coach: Emily Thiesse (1st title)
- MOP: Natalie Bremer (Minnesota State)

The 2024 NCAA Division II women's basketball tournament was the single-elimination tournament to determine the national champion of women's NCAA Division II college basketball in the United States, culminating the 2023–24 NCAA Division II women's basketball season. The tournament featured 64 teams.

The national quarterfinals (Elite Eight), semifinals, and finals were played from March 25–29, 2024, at the St. Joseph Civic Arena in St. Joseph, Missouri.

Minnesota State defeated Texas Woman's in the final, 89–73, to claim the Mavericks' second national title and first since 2009.

== Tournament schedule and venues ==
2024 NCAA Division II Women's Tournament sites

=== Regionals ===
First, second, and third-round games (the latter of which serves as a regional championship) were held at campus sites from March 15–18, 2024. The top-seeded team in each regional served as host.

=== Elite Eight ===
The national quarterfinals, semifinals, and finals were held at a predetermined site, the St. Joseph Civic Arena in St. Joseph, Missouri.

== Qualification ==
A total of 64 bids were available for the tournament: Twenty-three automatic bids (awarded to the champions of each Division II conference) and 41 at-large bids.

The bids are allocated evenly among the eight NCAA-designated regions (Atlantic, Central, East, Midwest, South, South Central, Southeast, and West), each of which contains either two or three of the twenty-three Division II conferences that sponsor men's basketball. Each region consists of two or three automatic qualifiers (the teams who won their respective conference tournaments) and either five or six at-large bids, awarded regardless of conference affiliation.

== Bracket ==
=== Atlantic regional ===
- Site: Erie, Pennsylvania (Gannon) and Fairmont, West Virginia (Fairmont State)

First round March 15
1	Gannon	73
8	West Virginia State	53
5	California (PA)	60
4	Lock Haven	74
3	Fayetteville State	72
6	Indiana (PA)	63
7	West Chester	68
2	Fairmont State	72

Regional semifinals March 16
1	Gannon	91
4	Lock Haven	72
3	Fayetteville State	70
2	Fairmont State	62

Regional Finals; March 19
1	Gannon	72
3	Fayetteville State	47

=== Central regional ===
- Site: Bethany, Oklahoma (Southern Nazarene)

First round March 15
1	Southern Nazarene	70
8	Henderson State	61
5	Harding	82*
4	Pittsburg State	74
3	Fort Hays State	62
6	NW Missouri State	47
7	Minnesota State	78
2	Missouri Western	58

Regional semifinals March 16
1	Southern Nazarene	72
5	Harding	62
3	Fort Hays State	66
7	Minnesota State	78

Regional Finals; March 18
1	Southern Nazarene	48
7	Minnesota State	80

* – Denotes overtime period

=== East regional ===
- Site: Waltham, Massachusetts (Bentley)

First round March 15
1	Bentley	63
8	Mercy	50
5	SNHU	89
4	Jefferson	91*
3	Saint Rose	47
6	Daemen	52
7	Franklin Pierce	43
2	Assumption	58

Regional semifinals March 16
1	Bentley	50
4	Jefferson	68
6	Daemen	68
2	Assumption	58

Regional Finals; March 18
4	Jefferson	62
6	Daemen	69

* – Denotes overtime period

=== Midwest regional ===
- Site: Allendale, Michigan (Grand Valley State)

First round March 15
1	Grand Valley State	63
8	Trevecca Nazarene	35
5	Kentucky Wesleyan	56
4	Northern Michigan	69
3	Ferris State	75
6	Lewis	53
7	Drury	65
2	Ashland	102

Regional semifinals March 16
1	Grand Valley State	72
4	Northern Michigan	44
3	Ferris State	64
2	Ashland	59

Regional Finals; March 18
1	Grand Valley State	46
3	Ferris State	49

=== South regional ===
- Site: Valdosta, Georgia (Valdosta State)

First round March 15
1	Valdosta State	66
8	Miles	55
5	Lee	61
4	Nova Southeastern	71
3	Tampa	76
6	Embry–Riddle (FL)	70
7	Eckerd	84
2	Union (TN)	70

Regional semifinals March 16
1	Valdosta State	58
4	Nova Southeastern	69
3	Tampa	69*
7	Eckerd	68

Regional Finals; March 18
4	Nova Southeastern	56
3	Tampa	63

* – Denotes overtime period

=== South Central regional ===
- Site: Denton, Texas (Texas Woman's)

First round March 15
1	Texas Woman's	81
8	Colorado Mines	72
5	Adams State	96
4	UT Permian Basin	83
3	Regis (CO)	54
6	Texas–Tyler	74
7	Lubbock Christian	61
2	Colorado Mesa	68

Regional semifinals March 16
1	Texas Woman's	74
5	Adams State	63
6	Texas–Tyler	68
2	Colorado Mesa	56

Regional Finals; March 18
1	Texas Woman's	65
6	Texas–Tyler	51

=== Southeast regional ===
- Site: Salisbury, North Carolina (Catawba)

First round March 15
1	Catawba	58
8	UNC Pembroke	48
5	Georgia Southwestern	62
4	Lenoir–Rhyne	59
3	Wingate	55
6	Anderson (SC)	74
7	Augusta	55
2	Carson–Newman	61

Regional semifinals March 16
1	Catawba	63
5	Georgia Southwestern	88
6	Anderson (SC)	54
2	Carson–Newman	74

Regional Finals; March 18
5	Georgia Southwestern	79
2	Carson–Newman	62

=== West regional ===
- Site: Azusa, California (Azusa Pacific)

First round March 15
1	Azusa Pacific	66
8	Cal State Los Angeles	60
5	Chico State	55
4	Montana State Billings	86
3	Western Washington	66
6	Cal Poly Pomona	61
7	Point Loma	61
2	Cal State San Marcos	82

Regional semifinals March 16
1	Azusa Pacific	56
4	Montana State Billings	66
3	Western Washington	56
2	Cal State San Marcos	62

Regional Finals; March 18
4	Montana State Billings	71
2	Cal State San Marcos	73

=== Elite Eight ===
- Site: St. Joseph Civic Arena, St. Joseph, Missouri

Elite Eight; March 25
1	Gannon	80
8	Cal State San Marcos	85*
5	Minnesota State	93
4	Georgia Southwestern	88
6	Tampa	60
3	Ferris State	63
7	Daemen	44
2	Texas Woman's	76

Final Four; March 27
8	Cal State San Marcos	68
5	Minnesota State	70
3	Ferris State	52
2	Texas Woman's	68

National Championship; March 29
5	Minnesota State	89
2	Texas Woman's	73

== See also ==
- 2024 NCAA Division I women's basketball tournament
- 2024 NCAA Division III women's basketball tournament
- 2024 NAIA women's basketball tournament
- 2024 NCAA Division II men's basketball tournament
