= 2024 NAIA women's basketball tournament =

- Teams: 64
- Finals site: Tyson Events Center, Sioux City, Iowa
- Champions: Dordt Defenders (1st title, 1st title game, 2nd Fab Four)
- Runner-up: Providence Argonauts (1st title game, 1st Fab Four)
- Semifinalists: Carroll Fighting Saints (1st Fab Four); Cumberlands Patriots (1st Fab Four)

The 2024 NAIA women's basketball tournament was the annual tournament held by the NAIA to determine the national champion of women's college basketball among its member programs in the United States and Canada, culminating the 2023–24 NAIA women's basketball season.

The tournament final were played at the Tyson Events Center in Sioux City, Iowa from March 21–26, 2024.

== Qualification ==
The tournament again featured sixty-four teams in a simple single-elimination format. The first two preliminary rounds were played on regional campus sites on March 15–16, and all subsequent rounds were played from March 21–26 at the predetermined final tournament site in Sioux City.

== See also ==
- 2024 NAIA men's basketball tournament
- 2024 NCAA Division I women's basketball tournament
- 2024 NCAA Division II women's basketball tournament
- 2024 NCAA Division III women's basketball tournament
