= Ayumi Hamasaki videography =

Ayumi Hamasaki video discography
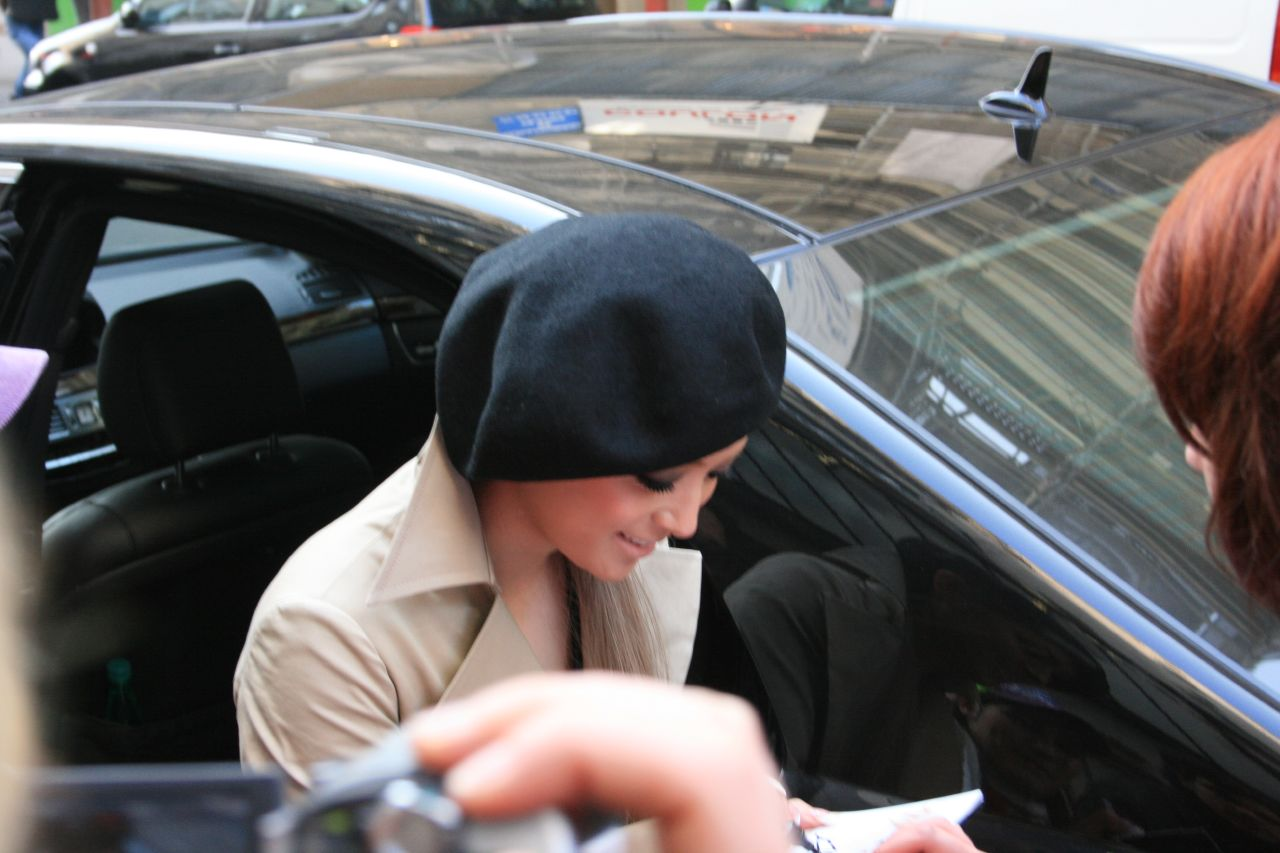
- Hamasaki in Paris in 2008
- Video albums: 37
- Music videos: 130

Japanese musician Ayumi Hamasaki has released more than 100 music videos since her debut in 1998, creating works for songs she has released as singles, as well as songs found exclusively on albums. Hamasaki has released 37 video albums, including 27 concert footage releases. Many of these have been successful, debuting at number one in Japan or Taiwan, while several have been certified gold by the RIAJ: Complete Live Box A (2003), A Museum: 30th Single Collection Live (2004), Arena Tour 2005 A: My Story (2005) and Arena Tour 2006 A: (Miss)understood (2006). Most of these concerts feature footage from her arena tours in Japan, or from her annual Countdown Live New Year's events. Her Tour of Secret video album featured footage from her concerts in Japan, Taiwan, Hong Kong and Shanghai in 2007, while her Ayumi Hamasaki Asia Tour 2008: 10th Anniversary concert recording was filmed exclusively in Taipei, Taiwan.

== Music videos ==
List of music videos, showing year released and director
Year	Title	Director(s)
1998	"Poker Face"	Wataru Takeishi
1998	"You"	Wataru Takeishi
1998	"Trust"	Wataru Takeishi
1998	"For My Dear..."	Hiromitsu Odagami
1998	"Depend On You"	Masashi Muto
1999	"Whatever"	Wataru Takeishi
1999	"Love (Destiny)"	Wataru Takeishi
1999	"To Be"	Wataru Takeishi
1999	"Boys & Girls"	Wataru Takeishi
1999	"Appears"	Wataru Takeishi
2000	"Kanariya"	Wataru Takeishi
2000	"Fly High"	Wataru Takeishi
2000	"Vogue"/"Far Away"/"Seasons"	Wataru Takeishi
2000	"Surreal"	Wataru Takeishi
2000	"M"	Wataru Takeishi
2001	"Evolution"	Wataru Takeishi
2001	"Never Ever" (Note: Released as a 1-minute promotional clip.)	Wataru Takeishi
2001	"Endless Sorrow"	Wataru Takeishi
2001	"Unite!"	Takahide Ishii
2001	"Dearest" (Note: This video had two versions: the Original and an Acoustic Piano version.)	Wataru Takeishi
2001	"M" (Above and Beyond remix)	Masato Okazaki
2002	"Connected"	Studio 4 °C Connected Project
2002	"Daybreak"	Wataru Takeishi
2002	"Free & Easy"	Wataru Takeishi
2002	"Voyage"	Isao Yukisada
2002	"Real Me"	Ukon Kamimura
2003	"Rainbow"	Wataru Takeishi
2003	"Ourselves"	Kouki Tange
2003	"Greatful Days"	Hideaki Sunaga
2003	"Hanabi (Episode II)"	Shuichi Tan
2003	"Forgiveness"	Yoshiya Okoyama + D.B.D
2003	"No Way to Say"	Ukon Kamimura
2003	"Angel's Song"	Hideaki Sunaga
2003	"Because of You"	Hideaki Sunaga
2004	"Moments"	Tetsuo Inoue
2004	"Inspire"	Tetsuo Inoue
2004	"Game"	Hideaki Sunaga
2004	"Carols"	Kiyoshi Utsumi
2004	"About You"	Hideaki Sunaga
2004	"Humming 7/4"	Wataru Takeishi
2004	"Walking Proud"	Ken Sueda
2005	"Step You"	Tetsuo Inoue
2005	"Is This Love?"	Masashi Muto
2005	"My Name's Women"	Wataru Takeishi
2005	"Fairyland"	Wataru Takeishi
2005	"Alterna"	Kouki Tange
2005	"Heaven"	Wataru Takeishi
2005	"Bold & Delicious"	Luis Hernandez
2005	"Pride"	Luis Hernandez
2006	"Bold & Delicious" (Side Story version)	Luis Hernandez
2006	"Ladies Night"	Masashi Muto
2006	"Rainy Day"	Tetsuo Inoue
2006	"Startin'"	Takahide Ishii
2006	"Born to Be..."	Takahide Ishii
2006	"Blue Bird"	Takahide Ishii
2006	"Beautiful Fighters"	Takahide Ishii, Luis Hernandez
2006	"1 Love"	Hideaki Sunaga
2006	"Jewel"	Wataru Takeishi
2006	"Momentum"	Takahide Ishii
2007	"Part of Me"	Takahide Ishii
2007	"Glitter"	Wong Hoi
2007	"Fated"	Wong Hoi
2007	"Talkin' 2 Myself"	Takahide Ishii
2007	"Decision"	Wataru Takeishi
2008	"(Don't) Leave me alone"	Takahide Ishii
2008	"Marionette"	Takahide Ishii
2008	"Mirrorcle World"	Kazuyoshi Shimomura
2008	"Days"	Takahide Ishii
2008	"Green"	Kazuyoshi Shimomura
2009	"Rule"	Takahide Ishii
2009	"Sparkle"	Kazuyoshi Shimomura
2009	"Next Level"	Stanly Izumi Kim, Luis Hernandez
2009	"Curtain Call"	Stanly Izumi Kim, Luis Hernandez
2009	"Sunrise (Love is All)"	Wataru Takeishi
2009	"Sunset (Love is All)"	Wataru Takeishi
2009	"You Were..."	Masashi Muto
2009	"Ballad"	Takahide Ishii
2010	"Sexy Little Things"	Masashi Muto
2010	"Microphone"	Masashi Muto
2010	"Don't Look Back"	Hideaki Sunaga
2010	"Lady Dynamite"	Kazuyoshi Shimomura
2010	"Moon"	Hideaki Sunaga
2010	"Crossroad"	Masashi Muto
2010	"Blossom"	Takahide Ishii
2010	"Virgin Road"	Masashi Muto
2010	"Sweet Season"	Luis Hernandez
2010	"Last Angel"	Masashi Muto
2010	"Love Song"	Masashi Muto
2010	"Do It Again"	Masashi Muto
2011	"Progress"	Masashi Muto
2011	"Another Song" (feat. Naoya Urata)	Masashi Muto
2011	"Why..." (feat. Juno)	Masashi Muto
2011	"Beloved"	Leslie Kee
2011	"Brillante"	Leslie Kee
2012	"NaNaNa"	Masashi Muto
2012	"Shake It"	Masashi Muto
2012	"Return Road"	Masashi Muto
2012	"How Beautiful You Are"	Masashi Muto
2012	"You & Me"	Masashi Muto
2012	"Song 4 U"	Masashi Muto
2012	"Missing"	Masashi Muto
2012	"Wake Me Up"	Masashi Muto
2012	"Snowy Kiss"	Masashi Muto
2012	"Sweet Scar"	Wataru Takeishi
2013	"Melody"	Masashi Muto
2013	"Feel the Love"	Yusuke Azumaya
2013	"Merry-go-round"	Luis Hernandez
2014	"Feel the Love" ("Ayupan × Bloody Bunny" ver.)	Riff Studio
2014	"Merry-go-round" (Appearance by Verbal ver.)	Satoru Yokoyama
2014	"XOXO"	A Crew
2014	"Angel"	A Crew
2014	"Lelio"	A Crew
2014	"Zutto..."	Masashi Muto
2015	"Last Minute"	Masashi Muto
2015	"The Gift" (feat. JJ Lin)	Hideaki Sunaga
2015	"Warning"	A Crew
2015	"Step by Step"	Hideaki Sunaga
2015	"Summer Diary"	Hideaki Sunaga
2015	"Sayonara" (feat. SpeXial)	Daisuke Ninomiya
2015	"Winter Diary"	Masashi Muto
2016	"Flower"	Masashi Muto
2016	"Mad World"	Masashi Muto
2020	"Ohia no Ki"	Kazuyoshi Shimomura
2020	"Dreamed a Dream"	Masashi Muto
2021	"Haru yo, Koi"	Kazuyoshi Shimomura
2021	"23rd Monster"	Hideaki Sunaga
2022	"Nonfiction"	Hideaki Sunaga
2022	"Summer Again"	Hideaki Sunaga
2022	"Mask"	Hideaki Sunaga
2024	"Bye-Bye"	Hideaki Sunaga
2024	"Aurora"	Hideaki Sunaga
2025	"Mimosa"	Masashi Muto

=== As a featured artist ===
List of music videos, showing year released and director
Year	Title	Director(s)
2010	"Dream On" (Naoya Urata feat. Ayumi Hamasaki)	Masashi Muto

== Video albums ==
=== Music video albums ===
List of media, with selected chart positions
Title	Album details	Peak positions			Sales (Oricon)
Title	Album details	JPN DVD	JPN Blu-ray	TWN DVD (Note: Week references for G-Music: Arena Tour 2005 A: My Story 2005 week 36, Countdown Live 2005-2006 A 2006 week 14, Arena Tour 2006 A: (Miss)understood 2006 week 45, Asia Tour 2007 A: Tour of Secret 2008 week 12, Countdown Live 2007-2008 Anniversary 2008 week 26, Asia Tour 2008: 10th Anniversary 2009 week 8, Premium Countdown Live 2008–2009 A 2009 week 21, Arena Tour 2009 A: Next Level 2010 week 17, Countdown Live 2009-2010 A: Future Classics 2010 week 30, Rock 'n' Roll Circus Tour Final: 7 Days Special 2011 week 19, A 50 Singles: Live Selection 2011 week 19, Countdown Live 2010-2011 A: Do It Again 2011 week 37, A Clip Box 1998-2011 2012 week 1, Power of Music 2011 A 2012 week 15, Arena Tour 2012 A: Hotel Love Songs 2013 week 11, Countdown Live 2012-2013 A: Wake Up 2013 week 16, A Best Live 2013 week 52, Countdown Live A 2013-2014 2014 week 20, Feel the Love 2014 week 47.)	Sales (Oricon)
A Film for ××	Released: September 15, 1999; Label: Avex; Formats: VHS, VCD	—	—	—	N/A
A Clips	Released: February 23, 2000; Label: Avex; Formats: VHS, VCD	—	—	—	N/A
Hamasaki Ayumi	Released: February 29, 2000; Label: Avex; Formats: DVD, VCD	2	—	—	104,000
Vogue Far Away Seasons	Video single; Released: July 12, 2000; Label: Avex; Formats: DVD, VHS	1	—	—	82,000
Surreal	Video single; Released: December 13, 2000; Label: Avex; Formats: DVD, VHS	3	—	—	93,000
M	Video single; Released: February 7, 2001; Label: Avex; Formats: DVD, VHS	1	—	—	91,000
Evolution	Video single; Released: June 13, 2001; Label: Avex; Formats: DVD, VHS	1	—	—	N/A
A Clips Vol. 2	Released: March 13, 2002; Label: Avex; Formats: DVD, VHS, VCD	2	—	—	90,000
Complete Clip Box A	Released: February 25, 2004; Label: Avex; Formats: DVD, VCD	5	—	—	64,000
Five	Released: November 9, 2011; Label: Avex; Formats: Blu-ray, CD+DVD, CD	—	17	—	687
A Clip Box 1998–2011	Released: January 1, 2012; Label: Avex; Formats: DVD, Blu-ray	14	3	2	15,000
"—" denotes items which were released before the creation of the Oricon DVD chart or the G-Music Chart.

== Live concert films ==
List of media, with selected chart positions
Title	Album details	Peak positions			Certifications
Title	Album details	JPN DVD	JPN Blu-ray	TWN DVD	Certifications
Concert Tour 2000 Vol. 1	Released: September 27, 2000; Label: Avex; Formats: DVD, VHS, VCD	1	—	—	
Concert Tour 2000 Vol. 2	Released: September 27, 2000; Label: Avex; Formats: DVD, VHS, VCD	2	—	—	
Countdown Live 2000–2001 A	Released: June 20, 2001; Label: Avex; Formats: DVD, VHS, VCD	3	—	—	
Dome Tour 2001 A	Released: December 12, 2001; Label: Avex; Formats: DVD, VHS, VCD	2	—	—	
Complete Live Box A	Released: January 29, 2003; Label: Avex; Formats: DVD	2	—	—	RIAJ: Gold
Arena Tour 2002 A	Released: January 29, 2003; Label: Avex; Formats: DVD, VHS, VCD	22	—	—	
Stadium Tour 2002 A	Released: January 29, 2003; Label: Avex; Formats: DVD, VHS, VCD	13	—	—	
A Museum: 30th Single Collection Live	Released: February 25, 2004; Label: Avex; Formats: DVD, VCD	3	—	—	RIAJ: Gold
Arena Tour 2003–2004 A	Released: September 29, 2004; Label: Avex; Formats: DVD, VCD	6	—	—	
Countdown Live 2004–2005 A	Released: March 2, 2005; Label: Avex; Formats: DVD, VCD	3	—	—	
Arena Tour 2005 A: My Story	Released: August 24, 2005; Label: Avex; Formats: DVD, VCD	5	—	1	RIAJ: Gold
Countdown Live 2005–2006 A	Released: March 23, 2006; Label: Avex; Formats: DVD, VCD	3	—	3	
Arena Tour 2006 A: (Miss)understood	Released: November 1, 2006; Label: Avex; Formats: DVD, VCD, Blu-ray	2	63	1	RIAJ: Gold
Asia Tour 2007 A: Tour of Secret	Released: March 12, 2008; Label: Avex; Formats: DVD, VCD	3	—	1	
Countdown Live 2007–2008 Anniversary	Released: June 18, 2008; Label: Avex; Formats: DVD, VCD, Blu-ray	2	82	1	
Asia Tour 2008: 10th Anniversary	Released: January 28, 2009; Label: Avex; Formats: DVD, VCD, Blu-ray	4	64	1	
Premium Countdown Live 2008–2009 A	Released: May 13, 2009; Label: Avex; Formats: DVD, VCD, Blu-ray	1	61	2	
Arena Tour 2009 A: Next Level	Released: April 14, 2010; Label: Avex; Formats: DVD, Blu-ray	2	—	1	
Countdown Live 2009–2010 A: Future Classics	Released: July 14, 2010; Label: Avex; Formats: DVD, Blu-ray	2	76	2	
Rock 'n' Roll Circus Tour Final: 7 Days Special	Released: April 20, 2011; Label: Avex; Formats: DVD, Blu-ray	3	—	1	
A 50 Singles: Live Selection	Released: April 20, 2011; Label: Avex; Formats: DVD, Blu-ray	4	—	2	
Countdown Live 2010–2011 A: Do It Again	Released: August 24, 2011; Label: Avex; Formats: DVD, Blu-ray	1	10	1	
Power of Music 2011 A	Released: March 21, 2012; Label: Avex; Formats: DVD, Blu-ray	8	19	2	
Arena Tour 2012 A: Hotel Love Songs	Released: March 8, 2013; Label: Avex; Formats: DVD, Blu-ray	6	3	3	
Countdown Live 2012–2013 A: Wake Up	Released: April 8, 2013; Label: Avex; Formats: DVD, Blu-ray	2	5	3	
15th Anniversary Tour: A Best Live	Released: October 30, 2013; Label: Avex; Formats: DVD, Blu-ray	3	3	4	
Countdown Live A 2013–2014	Released: April 30, 2014; Label: Avex; Formats: DVD, Blu-ray	2	6	1	
Premium Showcase: Feel the Love	Released: October 22, 2014; Label: Avex; Formats: DVD, Blu-ray	3	11	1	
Countdown Live 2014–2015 A: Cirque de Minuit	Released: April 8, 2015; Label: Avex; Formats: DVD, Blu-ray	1	8	–	
Arena Tour 2015 A: Cirque de Minuit – The Final	Released: October 28, 2015; Label: Avex; Formats: DVD, Blu-ray	1	11	—	
Arena Tour 2016 A: Made in Japan	Released: December 21, 2016; Label: Avex; Formats: DVD, Blu-ray	5	30	—	
21st Anniversary: Power of A^3	Released: September 4, 2019; Label: Avex; Formats: DVD, Blu-ray	2	7	—	
Countdown Live 2019–2020: Promised Land A	Released: August 26, 2020; Label: Avex; Formats: DVD, Blu-ray	6	9	—	
Best Live Box A	Released: December 25, 2020; Label: Avex; Formats: DVD, Blu-ray	—	—	—	n/a
Trouble Tour 2020 A: Saigo no Trouble – Final	Released: January 27, 2021; Label: Avex; Formats: DVD, Blu-ray	4	15	—	
Music for Life: Return	Released: September 8, 2021; Label: Avex; Formats: DVD, Blu-ray	—	—	—	
Asia Tour: 24th Anniversary Special	Released: August 17, 2022; Label: Avex; Formats: DVD, Blu-ray	1	7	—	
25th Anniversary Live	Released: July 1, 2023; Label: Avex; Formats: DVD, Blu-ray	4	8	2	
Unreleased Live Box	Released: March 13, 2024; Label: Avex; Formats: DVD, Blu-ray	—	—	—	n/a
Countdown Live 2023–2024 A: Complete 25	Released: October 2, 2024; Label: Avex; Formats: DVD, Blu-ray	5	11	—	
25th Anniversary Live Tour	Released: October 2, 2024; Label: Avex; Formats: DVD, Blu-ray	—	—	—	n/a
"—" denotes items which were released before the creation of the G-Music Chart.

== Other video albums ==
List of media, with selected chart positions
Title	Album details	Peak positions
Title	Album details	JPN
A Exercise	Exercise videos set to Hamasaki's music; Released: July 12, 2014; Label: Avex; Formats: 3DVD	8
