= Ayumi Hamasaki Arena Tour 2006 A =

Video by Ayumi Hamasaki
- Released: November 1, 2006
- Genre: J-pop

Ayumi Hamasaki chronology
Ayumi Hamasaki Countdown Live 2005-2006 A (2006)	Ayumi Hamasaki Arena Tour 2006 A (2006)	Ayumi Hamasaki Best of Countdown Live 2006-2007 A (2007)

Ayumi Hamasaki's Arena Tour 2006 A: (Miss)understood is a Japanese nationwide tour which took place in early 2006. The DVD of the final show in Tokyo was released November 1, 2006.

Ayumi performed most of her songs from (Miss)understood, along with some of her most popular songs such as Evolution, Unite!, and Boys & Girls.

The third disc contains behind-the-scenes footage plus other special feature material.

This DVD has sold over 100,000 physical copies - the first one to do so since "Ayumi Hamasaki A Museum: 30th Single Collection Live" that was released on February 25, 2004.

== Track listing ==
=== Disc 1 (Live) ===
1. Are You Wake Up?
2. Born to Be...
3. Audience
4. Evolution
5. Step you
6. Ladies Night
7. Alterna
8. Is This Love?
9. (Miss)understood
10. Tasking
11. Pride
12. Rainy Day
13. Startin'
14. Unite!
15. Bold & Delicious

=== Disc 2 (Encore) ===
1. Heaven
2. Teens
3. Blue Bird
4. Humming 7/4
5. Boys & Girls
6. Beautiful Day

=== Disc 3 (Special Side) ===
1. MC
2. Off-stage shots collection
