= Ayumi Hamasaki Countdown Live 2010–2011 A: Do It Again =

Video by Ayumi Hamasaki
- Released: August 24, 2011
- Genre: J-pop
- Label: Avex

Ayumi Hamasaki chronology
Ayumi Hamasaki Rock 'n' Roll Circus Tour Final: 7 Days Special (2011)	Ayumi Hamasaki Countdown Live 2010–2011 A: Do It Again (2011)	Ayumi Hamasaki Power of Music 2011 A (2012)

Ayumi Hamasaki Countdown Live 2010–2011 A: Do It Again is Japanese pop singer Ayumi Hamasaki's 10th Countdown concert DVD .

== Track list ==
1. Snowfield
2. Last Angel
3. Duty
4. Is This Love?
5. Marionette -prelude-
6. Marionette
7. Free & Easy
8. Endless Sorrow
9. Dearest ~ Heaven ~ Carols ~ Together When...
10. Aria
11. Humming 7/4
12. Bold & Delicious
13. Mirrorcle World
14. Seven Days WAR
15. Evolution
16. Boys & Girls
17. Dream On

== Encore ==
1. Love Song
2. Virgin Road
3. Moon
4. Trauma ~ Audience ~ Fly high
5. Flower Garden
6. Thank U
7. Do It Again

== Total reported sales ==
31,844

== Oricon week ranks ==
1st week: #1, 2nd week: #1, 3rd week: #5
