= Lists of most expensive items by category =

An index of lists of most expensive things.

== Artwork ==
- List of most expensive paintings
- List of most expensive sculptures
- List of most expensive artworks by living artists

== Collectibles ==
- List of most expensive cards from collectible card games
- List of most expensive coins
- List of most expensive philatelic items
- List of most expensive sports cards

== Locations ==
- List of most expensive cities for expatriate employees
- List of most expensive streets by city

== Luxury ==
- List of most expensive watches sold at auction

== Media ==
- List of most expensive books and manuscripts
- List of most expensive celebrity photographs
- List of most expensive domain names
- List of most expensive films
- List of most expensive music videos
- List of most expensive non-fungible tokens
- List of most expensive photographs
- List of most expensive albums
- List of most expensive music deals
- List of most expensive television series
- List of most expensive video games to develop
- List of most valuable celebrity memorabilia
- List of most valuable records

== Projects ==
- List of most expensive U.S. public works projects

== Properties ==
- List of most expensive buildings

== Social ==
- List of most expensive divorces

== Sports ==
- List of most expensive association football transfers
- List of most expensive basketball transfers
- List of most expensive stadiums

== Transport ==
- List of world's most expensive transport infrastructure
- List of most expensive cars sold in auction
