= (Miss)understood =

- CD only cover

Studio album by Ayumi Hamasaki
- Released: January 1, 2006
- Recorded: 2005
- Studios: Prime Sound Studio Form (Tokyo); Sony Music Studios (New York City); Avex Studio Azabu (Tokyo); Bunkamura Studio (Tokyo); Hitokuchizaka Studio (Tokyo); Crescente Studio (Tokyo); Westside Studio (Tokyo); Aobadai Studio (Tokyo); Sound City (Tokyo); Victor Studio (Tokyo)
- Genres: J-pop; dance-pop; pop rock; alternative rock; R&B
- Length: 66:31
- Label: Avex Trax
- Producer: Max Matsuura

Ayumi Hamasaki chronology
My Story (2004)	(Miss)understood (2006)	Secret (2006)

Alternative cover
- CD/DVD cover

Singles from (Miss)understood
- 1. "Step You/Is This Love?" Released: April 20, 2005; 2. "Fairyland" Released: August 3, 2005; 3. "Heaven" Released: September 14, 2005; 4. "Bold & Delicious/Pride" Released: November 30, 2005

(Miss)understood is the seventh studio album by Japanese singer-songwriter Ayumi Hamasaki. It was released on New Year's Day 2006, by Avex Trax. Hamasaki acted as the album's sole lyricist, as she had on all of her preceding albums. (Miss)understood marked new musical directions for Hamasaki: she explored new influences such as funk and used gospel choruses in some of the songs, foreign to her previous works. This was the result of her having heard compositions by Geo from the German-based pop music project Sweetbox and asking him for his works. Subsequently, Hamasaki rewrote the lyrics entirely to fit (Miss)understood.

Lyrically, the album was a departure from her previous work, My Story, which had been primarily autobiographical. Where My Story had contained "musings about her past", Hamasaki wanted the lyricism on (Miss)understood to send a strong message to all women—to be a kind of "girls' talk" to give "moral support", while at the same time reminding women that there were times when they would feel weak and low. These themes, along with the album's funk influences, are epitomized on songs such as "Bold & Delicious" and "Ladies Night."

Upon its release, (Miss)understood received generally favorable reviews from music critics, who directed most of the acclaim towards its sonic quality and named it one of the best albums in Hamasaki's career. (Miss)understood was a commercial success, opening at number one in Japan (her seventh consecutive studio album to do so) with first-week sales of over 653,000 copies. It went on to receive a Million certification from the Recording Industry Association of Japan (RIAJ) and became the eighth best-selling album of 2006 in Japan. It is, to date, her last Million-certified album. According to Avex, it is also her first album to fail to hit over a million sales in Japan.

To promote the album, Hamasaki released four singles. "Step You" and "Is This Love?" were packaged together as a double A-side single and as the album's lead single on April 20, 2005; it was a commercial success, peaking at number one on the Oricon Singles Chart and was certified platinum by the RIAJ. The album's second single, "Fairyland," was a commercial success; also peaking at number one on the Oricon Singles Chart and being certified platinum. The third single, "Heaven", experienced similar success: it reached number one, and was certified platinum. "Bold & Delicious" and "Pride" were packaged together as the album's second and last double A-side single and was not as successful. Despite reaching number one, it became her poorest-selling single at the time since 1998's "Depend on You." Hamasaki promoted (Miss)understood by embarking on the Ayumi Hamasaki Arena Tour 2006 A arena tour.

== Background and production ==
"This 'miss' is not the iss of mistake, but the same miss as in Mr. or Mrs. So, you can take the word 'missunderstood' as a single word meaning 'misunderstanding' or 'someone who understands'."

— Hamasaki explaining the title (Miss)understood.

In 2005, after hearing demo tracks from band Sweetbox's then-upcoming album Addicted, Hamasaki "fell in love" with the songs and consequently asked Sweetbox's composer GEO if she could use some of the songs for her album. GEO agreed and gave Hamasaki permission to use "Bold & Delicious," "Pride," "Ladies Night," "In the Corner," "Every Step," and "Beautiful Girl." Hamasaki then set to work rewriting the lyrics and rearranging parts of songs. On October 24, 2005, it was confirmed that Hamasaki would be releasing a new album on January 1, 2006, with its title being undecided at the time. On December 13, 2005, it was reported that the recording for the new album was completed. Hamasaki and Avex Trax enlisted a long-term collaborator, Japanese businessman and producer Max Matsuura, to produce the album; this marked Hamasaki's seventh consecutive album to be fully produced by Matsuura.

While My Story (2004), Hamasaki's preceding album, contained mostly "autobiographical" lyrics and "musings about [her] past," (Miss)understood was a "strong message to send to all women": it was a kind of "girl's talk" to give "moral support" while at the same time reminding women that there would be times when they would "feel weak and low". "Bold & Delicious" "scolded indecisive men", "Pride" expressed Hamasaki's appreciation of "women who do not give up easily", and "Ladies Night" was about female camaraderie. Other themes appeared as well: "Is This Love?" and "Heaven" were about love, and "Fairyland" was about "childhood memories". In each song on (Miss)understood, Hamasaki sprinkled all kinds of mysteries and questions throughout–so her own message isn't necessarily in the songs.

Around the time of the release date for Addicted, Jade Valerie commented on Hamasaki's song adaptations: "I had the opportunity to listen to her self-covers this time, and I love how she have a completely different taste from my songs, but they really show off her strengths. I think it's a great album. I hope that people will listen to both my album and her album and enjoy both works."

== Composition ==
"Bold & Delicious" (2005)
Hamasaki took new directions on (miss)understood, as epitomized by the single "Bold & Delicious," a funk-influenced song that used a gospel-style chorus.

(Miss)understood is more musically diverse than My Story; Hamasaki incorporated a variety of musical styles including rock, dance-pop and funk. She didn't decide on a particular theme when she wrote the album's songs, but once she put them all together she noticed that content was quite dark and that the lyrics could be interpreted in more than one way.

The album opens with "Bold & Delicious," a funk-infused up-tempo track that utilizes a gospel choir in the harmony. An organ Hamasaki heard while visiting a church in New York City inspired her to include the gospel choir in "Bold & Delicious." "Step You" is an electronic rock song that sings about an "unrequited love". "Ladies Night" is an 80s-inspired dance pop number with robotic breakbeats and disco blips. "Is This Love?" is a passionate rock song about unrequited love. The album's titular song is a rock number stripped down to its simplest form. "Alterna" is a rock song with lyrics which seem to tell oneself to "just be as it is" without fear of change or being pointed out. "In The Corner" is a dramatic R&B song that has been compared to Mary J. Blige's 2001 hit song "Family Affair." "Tasking" is an interlude-like instrumental that connects "In The Corner" and "Criminal."

"While I was in New York City, I went around by myself to various places, and when I visited a church, the sound of the vibe organ there sounded like something you can only hear in New York. At that moment, I thought, "Ah, gospel." I wanted a funky chorus that sounded like someone was clapping and singing. Of course, I felt that my vocals recorded in a studio in New York were different from usual, but I began to feel a strong desire to reflect more of that unique New York feel in "Bold & Delicious."

— Hamasaki commenting on the developmental process of "Bold & Delicious."

"Criminal" is a solemn song which talks about how to deal with the "sense of guilt" felt in life. "Pride" is a ballad song that "sounded like it could be from a musical". Hamasaki gathered a lot of people from elementary school students to people in their 50s and had them sing together as the song's backup singers. The musical The Phantom of the Opera influenced her arrangement of "Pride." "Will" is a song that has a noble aura of "sparkling" light and "fluttering" dance. "Heaven" is an "ethereal" piano-driven ballad.

"Are You Wake Up?" is an instrumental track with a sharp and clear electric guitar. "Fairyland" is a dance pop song that sings about childhood nostalgia. "Beautiful Day" is a soulful song with a gospel choir in the chorus. The album's closing track, "Rainy Day," is sung in a quiet whisper, accompanied by sounds that sound like dripping rain or the ticking of a clock. As with "Bold & Delicious" and "Pride," other songs composed by GEO were rearranged.

== Release and packaging ==
(Miss)understood was released by Avex Trax on January 1, 2006, and was her first original album in a year and a month since her previous album, My Story (2004). (Miss)understood became Hamasaki's second two-album set alongside Secret (2006) to be released in a single year. Hamasaki's first two album set to do this were A Song for ×× and Loveppears in 1999. The initial pressings of (Miss)understood included two photobooks—one for the CD version (entitled "Off My Day"), and another for the CD+DVD version (entitled "On My Way"). The DVD version included all music videos that were made for her 2005 releases (excluding "My Name's Women")—"Step You," "Is This Love?," "Fairyland," "Alterna," "Heaven," "Bold & Delicious" and "Pride," as well as an alternative video for "Bold & Delicious" (called the "Side Story"). Two new music videos were also included—"Ladies Night" and "Rainy Day" made their debut on the disc. Behind-the-scenes clips for "Step You," "Is This Love?," "Fairyland," "Alterna," "Heaven" and "Pride" are featured as well.

== Promotion ==
=== Singles and other songs ===
"Step You/Is This Love?" was released as the lead single from (Miss)understood on April 20, 2005. "Step You" was used as the Panasonic "D-snap Audio" commercial song, while "Is This Love?" was used as the commercial song for Morinaga & Company's "BAKE." The double A-side was a commercial success, reaching number one in Japan, receiving a platinum certification for shipments of over 250,000 units, and selling 345,340 copies in its chart run. "Step You" was certified triple platinum individually by the Recording Industry Association of Japan (RIAJ) for ringtone sales of 750,000 units, and gold for selling 100,000 downloads.

Second single "Fairyland" was released August 3, 2005. "Fairyland" was used as the commercial song for Miki Corporation's Camelia Diamond, the August opening theme for Nippon Television's Music Fighter, Nippon Television's Sports Urugusu image song, and as the theme song for Nissan Motors' "X-TRAIL CUP." The single's B-side "Alterna" was used as the commercial song for the Panasonic digital camera "Lumix FX8." The single "Fairyland" debuted at number one in Japan, sold 316,663 copies, and received a platinum certification for shipments of over 250,000 units. "Fairyland" also sold well digitally, receiving a triple platinum certification for ringtone sales of over 750,000 units, and a gold certification for selling more than 100,000 cellphone downloads.

The third single, "Heaven," released on September 14, 2005, and was used as the theme song for the 2005 romantic drama film Shinobi: Heart Under Blade. The B-side song "Will" was used as the Panasonic LUMIX FX-9 commercial song. Akin to its predecessors, "Heaven" also experienced commercial success: it reached number one, and was certified platinum, selling a total of 327,111 copies. It also was certified million for selling about one million ringtones, and gold for selling 100,000 downloads.

"Bold & Delicious/Pride" was released on November 30, 2005, as the album's final single. "Bold & Delicious" was also used as the Panasonic SD audio "D-snap Audio" and mini component "D-dock" commercial song. Despite reaching number one, "Bold & Delicious/Pride" became her poorest-selling single at the time since 1998's "Depend on You," selling only 132,993 copies. The song "Rainy Day" was used as the ending theme for the game Onimusha: Dawn of Dreams.

=== Music videos ===
The music video for "Step You" was directed by Tetsuo Inoue, and the video featured Hamasaki wearing different styles of outfits (signifying different parts of her image and personality). A man walks up to a music box-like contraption and as he activates the levers (shown as I, II, III, and IV) different miniature versions of Hamasaki appear. As he activates the last lever, the contraption begins to short-circuit, and the four Hamasakis turn into one.

The music video for "Is This Love?" was directed by Masashi Muto. The music video features Hamasaki singing emotionally in a hotel suite. As she passes by, objects begin to explode (i.e. a bowl of fruit, a fish tank, walls, etc.). The video ends as Hamasaki looks at the hotel, in one piece with no sort chaos that happened earlier.

The music video of "Fairyland" was shot in Hawaii and is one of the most expensive music videos in the world, as well as being Japan's most expensive music video in terms of production costs. The music video cost 240 million Yen (2 million in U.S. dollars). The video was directed by Wataru Takeishi, and it depicts Hamasaki with her companions (dance team) on a lush tropical island, with some scenes showing a timber house with a deck. Eventually, a fallen oil lamp causes the entire structure to burn. Images from earlier sequences showing the group having fun are interspersed through the burning of the house. The video ends with the camera moving away from Hamasaki singing solemnly as she watches the house burn.

The music video of "Alterna" was directed by Koki Tange, and it depicts Hamasaki as an up-coming star who is chased by clowns. The video also depicts her as a singing machine; this aspect of the music video (as well as the lyrics of "alterna") may be Hamasaki's response to either tabloid articles or to her record label's oppressive treatment of her at the time.

The music video for "Heaven" features Hamasaki singing alone in a subway station. As she does, ghosts frequently pass by her. Near the end of the video, the spirits leave Hamasaki and board on a train (implying their departure to heaven). The video is done entirely in one shot and in black-and-white.

The music videos of "Bold & Delicious" and "Pride" were both filmed in New York and were both directed by Luis Hernandez.

In the video for "Bold & Delicious," Hamasaki is featured with long wavy black hair, and wears a faux fur jacket with a light pink dress. She is seen standing on the back of a moving truck driving through areas of New York City, evoking the iconic 1993 Björk music video for her single "Big Time Sensuality." Some shots feature "behind the scenes" material, showing footage of the truck driving around the city and film crew members.

The video for "Pride" features several long takes of Hamasaki in a black dress being prepared by assistants and make-up artists, and then walking through an on-location set prepared under a New York City bridge and in the rain.

The music video for "Ladies Night" features Hamasaki wearing a pink and blue mini dress, and long blue leg muffs as she walks down a hotel hallway, trying to go into some of the rooms, and occasionally singing into a payphone. Scenes of different things happening in the rooms can be seen. In one room, a maid is mounted on a man and is whipping him. In another room, a woman dressed in a white 18th century dress and white powdered wig is seen walking around her room, which is all white and has a large collection of butterflies. In the third room, a strange woman in a bulky black dress with a long braided black wig and face painted all in black (later revealed to be Hamasaki herself) is seen dominating and whipping mannequins. The hotel room scenes have been compared by many to the 1995 indie film Four Rooms. In between the hotel room scenes there are other scenes of Hamasaki dressed in a dictator's outfit and addressing an army of bald and pale women in an outdoor arena that resembles the Colosseum. The women all appear to have the same face and march along to Hamasaki's singing during the song's middle eight.

The music video of "Rainy Day" features Hamasaki with short-black hair singing in a house looking in and out of the window. The scene then cuts to her sitting at a bus stop, wearing a white-powered wig. A dog appears out of an alleyway. The dog and Hamasaki stare at each other. During the mid-eight, rain has started to fall and the dog is no longer in the scene. Images of people passing the bus stop with umbrellas are shown. An Hansom cab then arrives and picks up Hamasaki. She sees the lone dog again and looks back with a regretful face. The house scenes featuring shows Hamasaki collapsing onto the floor and crying.

=== Live appearances and concert tours ===
Hamasaki embarked on the Ayumi Hamasaki Arena Tour 2006 A tour to promote (Miss)understood. The tour featured 30 shows and covered 12 different cities, lasting from March 11 to June 11, 2006, and attracted about 260,000 people in 30 performances. Hamasaki performed most of her songs from (Miss)understood, along with some of her most popular songs such as "Evolution," "Unite!" and "Boys & Girls." Avex Trax released the tour on DVD on November 1, 2006, and on Blu-ray on August 1, 2011. Commercially, the DVD release was a success in Japan, peaking at number two on the Oricon DVD Chart, and lasted 18 weeks in total. The live release was certified gold by the Recording Industry Association of Japan (RIAJ) for exceeding 100,000 unit shipments.

== Reception ==
Professional ratings
Review scores
Source	Rating
AllMusic	4/5 stars
CD Journal	(positive)

(Miss)understood received positive reviews from music critics. Neil Z. Yeung’s gave the album a strongly positive review, highlighting (Miss)understood as a bold, genre‑blending standout in Hamasaki’s early catalog. He praised its unexpected funk, gospel, and R&B‑pop influences and singles out multiple tracks as invigorating high points. Overall, he frames the album as one of her best and most underrated, making the tone clearly enthusiastic and appreciative.

CDJournal noted in their review that Hamasaki was in a transitional phase but still delivered a very catchy album built mostly from strong singles. Eikaku Kenta of VIBE gave the album a very positive review, praising Hamasaki’s consistent million‑selling success and presenting the album as a major, hit‑filled release with impressive visual production; framing the project as a special New Year’s gift to fans, emphasizing her creativity and ambition.

A commercial success, (Miss)understood sold 653,830 copies in its first week of release, and debuted at number one on the Oricon Albums Chart. This marks Hamasaki's seventh consecutive chart-topping studio album, starting with her first album A Song for ×× in January 1999. On its second week, the album dropped to number two on the chart with sales of 82,371 copies. (Miss)understood fell to number three on its third week on the charts with sales of 38,861 copies. The album charted at number eight on its fourth charting week with sales of 25,885 copies, before dropping out of the top ten entirely the following week. It charted in the top 300 for 32 weeks. Since the album sold 877,433 copies in 2006, it became the eighth best-selling album of the year in Japan and was also the year's second best-selling original studio album by a female artist behind Hikaru Utada's Ultra Blue. The album was certified million by the Recording Industry Association of Japan (RIAJ) for shipping over one million copies in the country, becoming Hamasaki's final album to do so. Aside from its success at home, (Miss)understood also found success overseas; in Taiwan the album topped the G-Music Combo Chart and J-Pop Chart.

== Track listing ==
All lyrics are written by Ayumi Hamasaki.

CD
No.	Title	Music	Arranger(s)	Length
1.	"Bold & Delicious"	Geo of Sweetbox	CMJK	4:43
2.	"Step You"	Kazuhiro Hara	CMJK	4:28
3.	"Ladies Night"	Geo of Sweetbox	CMJK	4:32
4.	"Is This Love?"	Miki Watanabe	HΛL	4:53
5.	"(Miss)understood"	Tetsuya Yukumi	Tasuku	4:04
6.	"Alterna"	Shintaro Hagiwara, Sousaku Sasaki	CMJK	5:30
7.	"In the Corner"	Geo of Sweetbox	Tasuku	3:24
8.	"Tasking" (instrumental)	Tasuku	Tasuku	1:28
9.	"Criminal"	Kazuhiro Hara	Kazuhiro Hara	5:13
10.	"Pride"	Geo of Sweetbox	CMJK	4:10
11.	"Will"	Crea, D.A.I (Note: Crea is the pseudonym of Ayumi Hamasaki.)	tasuku	4:09
12.	"Heaven"	Kazuhito Kikuchi	Yuta Nakano, KZB	4:21
13.	"Are You Wake Up?" (instrumental)	CMJK	CMJK	2:07
14.	"Fairyland"	tasuku	Hal	5:19
15.	"Beautiful Day"	Geo of Sweetbox	tasuku	4:36
16.	"Rainy Day"	Geo of Sweetbox	Yuta Nakano	4:02
Total length:				66:59

DVD
No.	Title	Length
1.	"Step You (Video Clip)"	4:52
2.	"Is This Love? (Video Clip)"	4:55
3.	"Fairyland (Video Clip)"	5:30
4.	"Alterna (Video Clip)"	5:42
5.	"Heaven (Video Clip)"	4:31
6.	"Bold & Delicious (Video Clip)"	5:09
7.	"Pride (Video Clip)"	4:32
8.	"Rainy Day (Video Clip)"	4:14
9.	"Ladies Night (Video Clip)"	4:31
10.	"Bold & Delicious: Side Story (Album Version)"
11.	"Step You (Making Clip)"	4:22
12.	"Is This Love? (Making Clip)"	5:03
13.	"Fairyland (Making Clip)"	5:19
14.	"Alterna (Making Clip)"
15.	"Heaven (Making Clip)"
16.	"Pride (Making Clip)"	4:38

== Charts ==
=== Weekly chart ===
Chart (2006)	Peak position
Japanese Albums (Oricon)	1
Taiwanese Albums (G-Music)	1
Taiwanese J-pop Albums (G-Music)	1

=== Monthly charts ===
Chart (2006)	Peak position
Japanese Albums (Oricon)	1

=== Yearly chart ===
Chart (2006)	Position
Japanese Albums (Oricon)	8

== Certification and sales ==
Region	Certification	Certified units/sales
Japan (RIAJ)	Million	930,000

== Release history ==
Region	Date	Format	Catalogue number
Japan	January 1, 2006	CD+DVD: Initial pressing limited edition: Special Photobook On My Way (80P)	AVCD-17837/B
Japan	January 1, 2006	CD: Initial pressing limited edition: Special Photobook Off My Day (80P)	AVCD-17838
Hong Kong	January 2006	CD+DVD	AVTCD-95881
Hong Kong	January 2006	CD	AVTCD-95876

== See also ==
- List of most expensive music videos (For the music video of "Fairyland")
