= List of most expensive music videos =

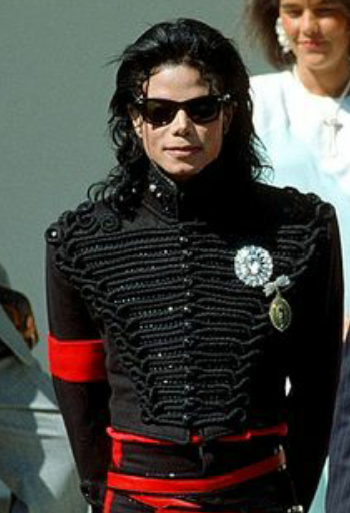
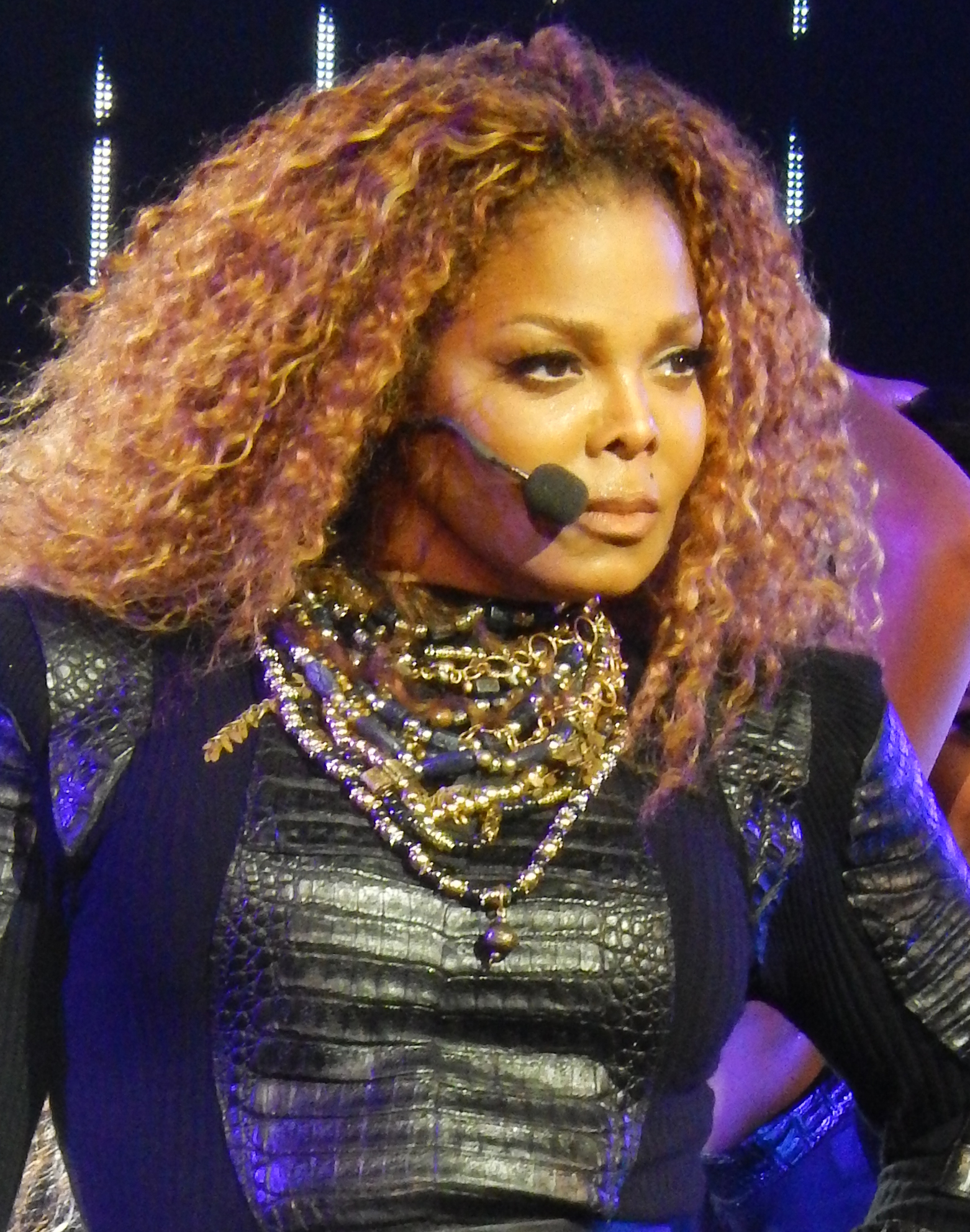
The music video for "Scream" by Michael Jackson (left) and Janet Jackson (right) has the highest-ever disclosed budget for a music video—both nominally and adjusted for inflation.

This article lists the most expensive music videos ever made, with costs of $500,000 or more, from those whose budgets have been disclosed.

David Bowie's video for the 1980 single "Ashes to Ashes" was the first music video to exceed this sum. Janet Jackson and Britney Spears have six videos each on the list, while Michael Jackson and Ayumi Hamasaki have five each. Madonna has made three appearances in the top five, and five total, making her the artist with the most expensive videos of all time combined. TLC, Mariah Carey, Kanye West, Busta Rhymes, Guns N' Roses, Mylène Farmer and MC Hammer appear on the list twice.

Joseph Kahn has directed seven, Paul Hunter has directed four, while Hype Williams, Cha Eun Taek and Wataru Takeishi have directed three. Nigel Dick, Mark Romanek and John Landis appear twice, the latter with videos both for Michael Jackson. This list only includes music videos with an announced or reported budget.

The only pre-1980s video on the list is "Pyar Kiya To Darna Kya" (1960) by Naushad, Shakeel Badayuni and Lata Mangeshkar. Sophie Muller's 2016 video for "Make Me Like You" by Gwen Stefani is both the most expensive music video directed by a woman and the most expensive music video of the 2010s, while "Feelslikeimfallinginlove" by British band Coldplay (2024) is both the most expensive music video by a non-American artist and the most expensive music video of the 2020s. Hamasaki's videos for the Japanese-language songs "My Name's Women" and "Fairyland" are tied as the most expensive non-English-language music videos. Madonna's videos for "Express Yourself" (1989) and "Die Another Day" (2002) are respectively the most expensive videos of the 1980s and the 21st century.

Romanek, who made Michael and Janet Jackson's "Scream", which was claimed the most expensive music video ever made, has since denied this claim, saying that there were two other music videos from the same era which cost "millions more" than "Scream". In a 2017 interview, Mick Garris, a writer for Michael Jackson's Ghosts stated that after several years of production development for the Ghosts short film: "It became the most expensive music video ever made...it ended up coming in at about $15 million, all of it out of Michael's pocket."

== Most expensive music videos ==
Indicates the title was the most expensive of all time at the time of production
Indicates non-English-language music videos

Most expensive music videos
Rank	Title	Artist(s)	Director	Year	Cost (est.)		Ref
Rank	Title	Artist(s)	Director	Year	Nominal	Adjusted	Ref
1	"Scream"	Michael Jackson & Janet Jackson	Mark Romanek	1995	$7,000,000	$14,790,347	
2	"Die Another Day"	Madonna	Traktor	2002	$6,100,000	$10,919,056	
3	"Express Yourself"	Madonna	David Fincher	1989	$5,000,000	$12,986,577	
3	"Bedtime Story"	Madonna	Mark Romanek	1995	$5,000,000	$10,564,534	
5	"Estranged"	Guns N' Roses	Andy Morahan	1993	$5,000,000	$11,143,746	
6	"Black or White"	Michael Jackson	John Landis	1991	$4,000,000	$9,455,167	
6	"You Rock My World"	Michael Jackson	Paul Hunter	2001	$4,000,000	$7,273,069	
6	"Make Me Like You"	Gwen Stefani	Sophie Muller	2016	$4,000,000	$5,366,057	
9	"Feelslikeimfallinginlove"	Coldplay	Ben Mor	2024	$3,386,005	$3,386,005	
10	"Rollin' (Air Raid Vehicle)"	Limp Bizkit	Fred Durst	2000	$3,000,000	$5,608,696	
11	"Victory"	Puff Daddy (featuring The Notorious B.I.G. & Busta Rhymes)	Marcus Nispel	1998	$2,700,000	$5,333,299	
12	"2 Legit 2 Quit"	MC Hammer	Rupert Wainwright	1991	$2,500,000	$5,909,480	
12	"Heartbreaker"	Mariah Carey (featuring Jay-Z)	Brett Ratner	1999	$2,500,000	$4,831,702	
12	"Doesn't Really Matter"	Janet Jackson	Joseph Kahn	2000	$2,500,000	$4,831,702	
15	"What's It Gonna Be?!"	Busta Rhymes (featuring Janet Jackson)	Hype Williams	1999	$2,400,000	$4,638,434	
16	"It's All Coming Back to Me Now"	Celine Dion	Nigel Dick	1996	$2,300,000	$4,721,515	
17	"Bad"	Michael Jackson	Martin Scorsese	1987	$2,200,000	$6,234,622	
18	"Larger Than Life"	Backstreet Boys	Joseph Kahn	1999	$2,100,000	$4,058,630	
19	"Remember the Time"	Michael Jackson	John Singleton	1992	$2,000,000	$4,588,570	
19	"Honey"	Mariah Carey	Paul Hunter	1997	$2,000,000	$4,011,194	
19	"Freeek!"	George Michael	Joseph Kahn	2002	$2,000,000	$3,580,019	
19	"My Name's Women"	Ayumi Hamasaki	Wataru Takeishi	2005	$2,000,000	$3,296,984	
19	"Fairyland"	Ayumi Hamasaki	Wataru Takeishi	2005	$2,000,000	$3,296,984	
26	"Me Against the Music"	Britney Spears (featuring Madonna)	Paul Hunter	2003	$1,750,000	$3,062,817	
27	"Green"	Ayumi Hamasaki	Kazuyoshi Shimomura	2008	$1,600,000	$2,967,286	
27	"Unpretty"	TLC	Paul Hunter	1999	$1,600,000	$3,092,289	
29	"November Rain"	Guns N' Roses	Andy Morahan	1992	$1,500,000	$3,441,428	
29	"Girlfriend/Boyfriend"	Blackstreet & Janet Jackson (featuring Eve & Ja Rule)	Joseph Kahn	1999	$1,500,000	$2,899,021	
29	"Give Me All Your Luvin'"	Madonna (featuring Nicki Minaj & M.I.A.)	Megaforce	2012	$1,500,000	$2,103,566	
32	"Here Comes the Hammer"	MC Hammer	MC Hammer	1990	$1,000,000	$2,464,340	
34	"Work Bitch" (Note: Industry insiders from Planet Hollywood reported that the music video's total production and editing costs amounted to $6.5 million, as stipulated by the contract Spears signed in her residency requirements, making it the second most expensive music video of all time. Later, the director disclaimed the costs; they were not nearly to $6.5 million at all.)	Britney Spears	Ben Mor	2013	$1,200,000	$1,658,571	
34	"Stronger"	Kanye West	Hype Williams	2007	$1,200,000	$1,863,264	
36	"I'm Not Perfect (But I'm Perfect for You)"	Grace Jones	Grace Jones	1986	$1,200,000	$3,524,590	
36	"Gerua"	Arijit Singh & Antara Mitra	Rohit Shetty	2015	$1,090,000	$1,480,521	
38	"Party All Night"	Yo Yo Honey Singh & Meet Bros	Anthony D'Souza	2013	$1,025,000	$1,655,352	
38	"Don't Say Goodbye"	Paulina Rubio	The Brothers Strause	2002	$1,000,000	$1,790,009	
38	"Toxic"	Britney Spears	Joseph Kahn	2004	$1,000,000	$1,704,545	
38	"Touch the Sky"	Kanye West (featuring Lupe Fiasco)	Chris Milk	2006	$1,000,000	$1,597,062	
38	"Call on Me"	Janet Jackson & Nelly	Hype Williams	2006	$1,000,000	$1,597,062	
38	"Cry Cry/Lovey Dovey"	T-ara	Cha Eun Taek	2011	$1,000,000	$1,431,213	
38	"The Ghost of You"	My Chemical Romance	Marc Webb	2005	$1,000,000	$1,431,213	
38	"City Walls"	Twenty One Pilots	Jensen Noen	2025	$1,000,000	$1,000,000	
56	"God's Plan"	Drake	Karena Evans	2018	$996,632	$1,277,818	
57	"One Shot"	B.A.P	Kang Ji Won & Kim Ki-bum	2013	$915,000	$1,264,661	
59	"Destiny"	Infinite	Hong Won-ki	2013	$890,000	$1,230,107	
60	"Kilimanjaro"	A. R. Rahman, Javed Ali, & Chinmayi	S. Shankar	2010	$875,000	$1,291,870	
61	"Malang"	Pritam (featuring Siddharth Mahadevan & Shilpa Rao)	Vijay Krishna Acharya	2013	$850,000	$1,655,352	
62	"Super Lady"	(G)I-dle	Son Seung-hee	2024	$820,000	$866,481	
63	"Heartbeat of Love"	Pia Zadora	Dominic Sena	1989	$800,000	$2,077,852	
63	"Saturnz Barz"	Gorillaz	Jamie Hewlett	2017	$800,000	$1,050,774	
63	"Triumph"	Wu-Tang Clan	Brett Ratner	1997	$800,000	$1,604,478	
63	"Ava Adore"	The Smashing Pumpkins	Dom and Nic	1998	$800,000	$1,580,237	
66	"California"	Mylène Farmer	Abel Ferrara	1996	$788,000	$1,617,632	
67	"Applause"	Lady Gaga	Vinoodh Matadin	2013	$767,000	$1,060,104	
68	"Push It"	Garbage	Andrea Giacobbe	1998	$750,000	$1,481,472	
68	"Oops!... I Did It Again"	Britney Spears	Nigel Dick	2000	$750,000	$1,402,174	
70	"Sad Promise"	Speed	Cha Eun Taek	2012	$706,000	$990,078	
71	"Pillow Talking"	Lil' Dicky	Tony Yacenda	2017	$700,000	$919,427	
72	"Tunak Tunak Tun"	Daler Mehndi	Daler Mehndi	1998	$610,000	$1,272,365	
73	"Ashes to Ashes"	David Bowie	David Bowie and David Mallet	1980	$581,000	$2,270,265	
74	"Azeem-O-Shaan Shahenshah"	A.R. Rahman & Javed Akhtar (featuring Mohammed Aslam & Bonnie Chakraborty)	Ashutosh Gowariker	2008	$575,000	$1,637,564	
75	"The Centre of the Heart"	Roxette	Jonas Akerlund	2001	$575,000	$2,338,636	
76	"Dola Re Dola"	Ismail Darbar, Shreya Ghoshal, & KK	Sanjay Leela Bhansali	2002	$514,300	$2,371,356	
77	"Thriller"	Michael Jackson	John Landis	1983	$500,000	$1,616,271	
78	"Livin' la Vida Loca"	Ricky Martin	Wayne Isham	1999	$500,000	$966,340	
79	"Piece of Me"	Britney Spears	Wayne Isham	2007	$500,000	$776,360	
80	"Hold It Against Me"	Britney Spears	Jonas Åkerlund	2011	$500,000	$715,607	
81	"Come Back Home"	2NE1	Dee Shin	2014	$470,000	$639,197	
82	"Pyar Kiya To Darna Kya"	Naushad, Shakeel Badayuni, Lata Mangeshkar	K. Asif	1960	$320,000	$3,482,565	

== Most expensive of all time at the time of production ==
Timeline of most expensive music videos
Year	Title	Artist(s)	Director	Cost (est.)		Ref
Year	Title	Artist(s)	Director	Nominal	Adjusted	Ref
1960	"Pyar Kiya To Darna Kya"	Naushad, Shakeel Badayuni, Lata Mangeshkar	K. Asif	$320,000	$3,482,565	
1980	"Ashes to Ashes"	David Bowie	David Bowie and David Mallet	$582,000	$2,274,172	
1984	"The Wild Boys"	Duran Duran	Russell Mulcahy	$1,000,000	$3,098,975	
1986	"I'm Not Perfect (But I'm Perfect for You)"	Grace Jones	Grace Jones	$1,200,000	$3,524,590	
1987	"Bad"	Michael Jackson	Martin Scorsese	$2,200,000	$6,234,622	
1989	"Express Yourself"	Madonna	David Fincher	$5,000,000	$12,986,577	
1995	"Bedtime Story"	Madonna	Mark Romanek	$5,000,000	$10,564,534	
1995	"Scream"	Michael Jackson and Janet Jackson	Mark Romanek	$7,000,000	$14,790,347	

== See also ==
- Vevo Certified Award
- Lists of most expensive items by category
  - List of most expensive albums
  - List of largest music deals
  - List of most valuable records

== Bibliography ==
- Royer, Hugues (2008). Mylène, biographie (in French). Spain: Flammarion. ISBN 9782352871392.
- Cachin, Benoît (2006). Le Dictionnaire des Chansons de Mylène Farmer (in French). Tournon. ISBN 2351440005.
- Chuberre, Erwan (2008). Mylène Farmer, phénoménale (in French). City. ISBN 9782352881766.
- Khairallah, Sophie (2007). Mylène Farmer, le culte - L'envers du décor (in French). Why Not. ISBN 9782916611259.
- Marks, Craig (2011). I Want My MTV: The Uncensored Story of the Music Video Revolution. E. P. Dutton. ISBN 9781101526415.
- Rees, Dafydd; Crampton, Luke (1999). Rock Stars Encyclopedia. DK. ISBN 0789446138.
