= Fairyland (song) =

- One of artwork variants

Single by Ayumi Hamasaki

from the album (Miss)understood
- B-side: "Alterna"
- Released: August 3, 2005
- Genre: J-pop, electronic
- Length: 31:21
- Label: Avex Trax
- Songwriters: Ayumi Hamasaki (lyrics) tasuku (music); Shintarou Hagiwara + Sousaku Sasaki (music)
- Producer: Max Matsuura

Ayumi Hamasaki singles chronology
"Step You/Is This Love?" (2005)	"Fairyland" (2005)	"Heaven" (2005)

Official Music Video
- "Fairyland" on YouTube

Official Music Video
- "Alterna" on YouTube

"Fairyland" is the 36th single released by Ayumi Hamasaki. It was released on August 3, 2005. It instantly shot to #1 on the Oricon charts where it stayed for the entire week. After one week of sales, "Fairyland" sold over 172,000 copies, the most any of Hamasaki's singles sold in one week in 2005. "Fairyland" is also Hamasaki's first single that featured different covers for both the CD and the CD+DVD.

== Music videos ==
The PV of Fairyland was shot in Hawaii and is one of the most expensive music videos in the world, as well as being Japan's most expensive music video in terms of production costs. The PV cost 240 million Yen (2 million in U.S. dollars), making it the most expensive music video for a non-English language song. It depicts Hamasaki with her companions (dance team) on a lush tropical island, with some scenes showing a timber house with a deck. Eventually, a fallen oil lamp causes the entire structure to burn. Images from earlier sequences showing the group having fun are interspersed through the burning of the house. The video ends with the camera moving away from Hamasaki singing solemnly as she watches the house burn.

The PV of Alterna depicts Ayumi as an up-and-coming star who is chased by clowns. The video also depicts her as a singing machine; this aspect of the music video (as well as the lyrics of "alterna") may be Hamasaki's response to either tabloid articles or to her record label's oppressive treatment of her at the time.

== Track listing ==
1. "Fairyland" – 5:17
2. "Alterna" – 5:28
3. "Step You" (DJ Taki-Shit More Step Up Remix) – 4:16
4. "Fairyland" (Bright Field Remix) – 5:30
5. "Fairyland" (Instrumental) – 5:17
6. "Alterna" (Instrumental) – 5:28

== DVD track listing ==
1. "Fairyland" (PV)
2. "Alterna" (PV)
3. "Fairyland" ("making of" photo gallery)

== Live performances ==
- June 27, 2005 – Hey! Hey! Hey! Music Champ
- July 15, 2005 – Music Station
- July 30, 2005 – CDTV
- August 1, 2005 – Hey! Hey! Hey! Music Champ
- August 5, 2005 – Music Station
- August 5, 2005 – Music Fighter
- December 31, 2005 – 56th Kouhaku Utagassen

== Charts ==
Oricon Sales Chart (Japan)

Release	Chart	Peak position	First week sales	Sales total	Chart run
August 3, 2005	Oricon Daily Singles Chart	1			
August 3, 2005	Oricon Weekly Singles Chart	1	172,221	370,000	13 weeks
August 3, 2005	Oricon Monthly Singles Chart	4			
August 3, 2005	Oricon Yearly Singles Chart	25			

- Total Sales : 370,000 (Japan)
- Total Sales : 388,000 (Avex)
- RIAJ certification: Platinum

== See also ==
- List of most expensive music videos
