= List of most expensive albums =

Music albums which were expensive to record, produce, and promote

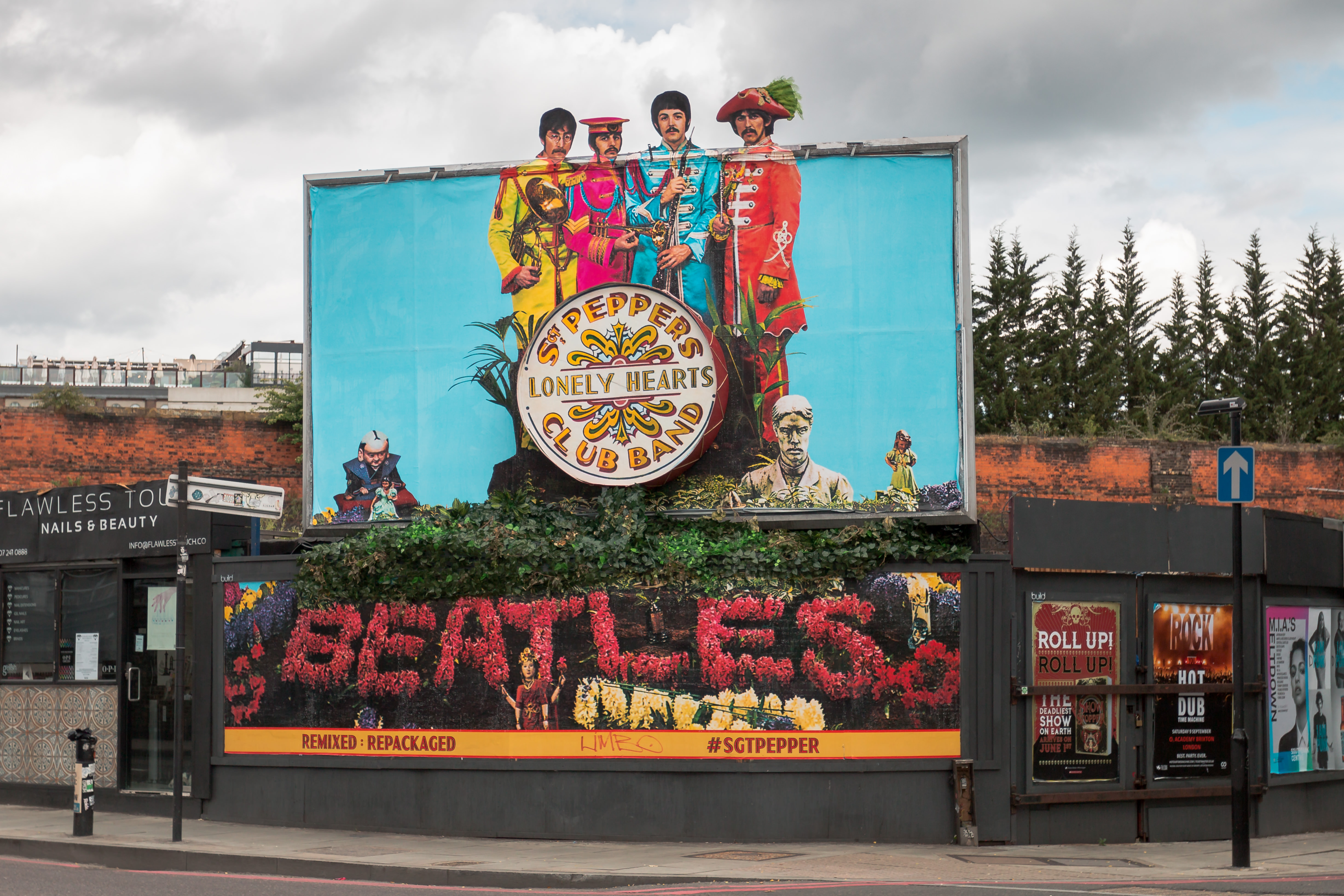
A Billboard for the 50th anniversary of Sgt. Pepper's Lonely Hearts Club Band (1967), an early example of an expensive album

Invincible (2001) by Michael Jackson is the most expensive album ever made, costing around $30–40 million USD to make.

The following is a list of the most expensive albums made with a recorded sum of over $1 million, as well as the most money spent on promotional campaigns and album covers.

The recording process traditionally requires an investment in studio time and skilled record production labor, and the process can be very costly. In the late 1950s, the cost of producing pop albums ran from $3,000 to $7,000. The average cost of producing an album climbed to $15,000 in the 1960s. Early examples of record-breaking expensive albums include Sgt. Pepper's Lonely Hearts Club Band (1967) with a reported sum of £25,000, (Note: Also cited with a cost at $100,000.) alongside Tommy (1969) and Pet Sounds (1966) each with a cost of $70,000, as well as unfinished album Smile whose single "Good Vibrations" (1966) alone had a budget between $50,000 and $75,000, (Note: Also cited with a cost at $25,000.) more than most entire albums cost at the time. Multiple albums were budgeted with a cost between $350,000 and $500,000 by late 1970s, whereas popular rock albums had an average of $100,000 and as high as $500,000 by the midpoint of the decade. (Note: By this point, Queen's A Night at the Opera (1975) began to be advertised as "the most expensive album ever made", although the estimated cost was only £40,000 and such a label was later denied by the band.) Some albums were produced on a $1 million budget by 1981. Accountant John McClain gave an estimated cost of $2.5 million for a Michael Jackson record in 1987. According to Joel Waldfogel citing record industry association the IFPI in Digital Renaissance (2020), the production budget of a popular album is now typically at least $200,000, and if much studio time is used, costs can comfortably exceed $350,000. Some artist's sponsorships covered the cost of producing the album, most notoriously Mariah Carey between the Bahamas Board of Tourism with her album Memoirs of an Imperfect Angel (2009).

Chinese Democracy (2008) by Guns N' Roses, once included as the most expensive record in the Guinness World Records, probably cost over $1 million per year during its recording sessions from 1998 to 2006. With a cost between $30 and $40 million, Michael Jackson's Invincible (2001) remains the most expensive album ever produced. Both Michael Jackson and Kanye West have multiple appearances on this list, with at least four each.

== List of albums by recorded costs ==
Released	Album	Artist(s)	Recorded	Approx cost	Adjusted cost (in 2025 prices)	Ref.
2001	Invincible	Michael Jackson	1997–2001	$30–40 million (Note: Other sources give a total cost of $65 million. Most likely divided in the reported budget of $30–40 million and $25 million for promotional purposes.)	$54,548,017–$72,730,690	
2008	Chinese Democracy	Guns N' Roses	1998–2007	$13 million	$19,439,722	
1995	HIStory: Past, Present and Future, Book I	Michael Jackson	1979–1995	$10 million	$21,129,067	
1991	Dangerous	Michael Jackson	1989–1991	$8–10 million	$18,910,335–$23,637,918	
2001	Victoria Beckham	Victoria Beckham	1999–2001	£5 million	£9,386,455	
1987	Hysteria	Def Leppard	1984–1987	$4.5–5 million	$14,169,596–$12,752,636	
1999	Garth Brooks in... the Life of Chris Gaines	Garth Brooks	1999	$5 million (Note: Overall cost was $20 million, which included promotion and recording.)	$9,663,404	
2009	Memoirs of an Imperfect Angel	Mariah Carey	2009	£4 million	£6,382,708	
2002	Untouchables	Korn	2001	$4 million (Note: Recording the album alone only cost $700,000.)	$7,160,037	
1988	Non Stop	Julio Iglesias	—N/a	$3 million	$8,166,854	
2010	My Beautiful Dark Twisted Fantasy	Kanye West	2009–2010	$3 million	$4,429,269	
2015	Once Upon a Time in Shaolin	Wu-Tang Clan	2007–2013	$3 million	$4,074,828	
2003	Deftones	Deftones	2002	$2.5 million	$4,375,452	
1987	Bad	Michael Jackson	1985–1987	$2 million	$5,667,838	
2005	Late Registration	Kanye West	2004–2005	$2 million	$3,296,984	
2010	Superficial	Heidi Montag	2007–2009	$2 million	$2,952,846	
1982	Rock in a Hard Place	Aerosmith	1981–1982	$1.5 million	$5,004,310	
1990	Charmed Life	Billy Idol	1989–1990	$1.5 million	$3,696,510	
1993	Aries	Luis Miguel	1992–1993	$1.5 million	$3,343,124	
2011	Watch the Throne	Kanye West and Jay-Z	2010–2011	$1.5 million	$2,146,820	
2013	Yeezus	Kanye West	2012–2013	$1.5 million	$2,073,214	
1979	Tusk	Fleetwood Mac	1978–1979	$1.4 million	$6,210,454	
2012	Cruel Summer	GOOD Music	2010	$1.3 million	$1,823,090	
1979	The Long Run	Eagles	1978–1979	$1 million	$4,436,039	
1981	For Those About to Rock We Salute You	AC/DC	1981	$1 million	$3,541,362	
1982	Donna Summer	Donna Summer	1981–1982	$1 million	$3,336,207	
1988	Brian Wilson	Brian Wilson	1987–1988	$1 million (Note: Another sum cited has been $800,000.)	$2,722,285	
1989	The Seeds of Love	Tears for Fears	1986–1989	$1 million	$2,597,315	
1991	Metallica	Metallica	1990–1991	$1 million	$2,363,792	
1995	The Woman in Me	Shania Twain	1994–1995	$1 million (Note: Another sum cited has been $750,000. Then most expensive country album ever made.)	$2,112,907	
1998	He Got Game	Public Enemy	1997–1998	$1 million	$2,722,285	
1999	Ricky Martin	Ricky Martin	1998–1999	$1 million	$1,932,681	
2002	One by One	Foo Fighters	2002	$1 million	$1,790,009	
2001	Karma	Tarkan	2000–2001	$1 million	$1,750,181	
2005	One Way Ticket to Hell... and Back	The Darkness	2005	$1 million	$1,648,492	

== List of albums by promotional budget/campaign cost ==
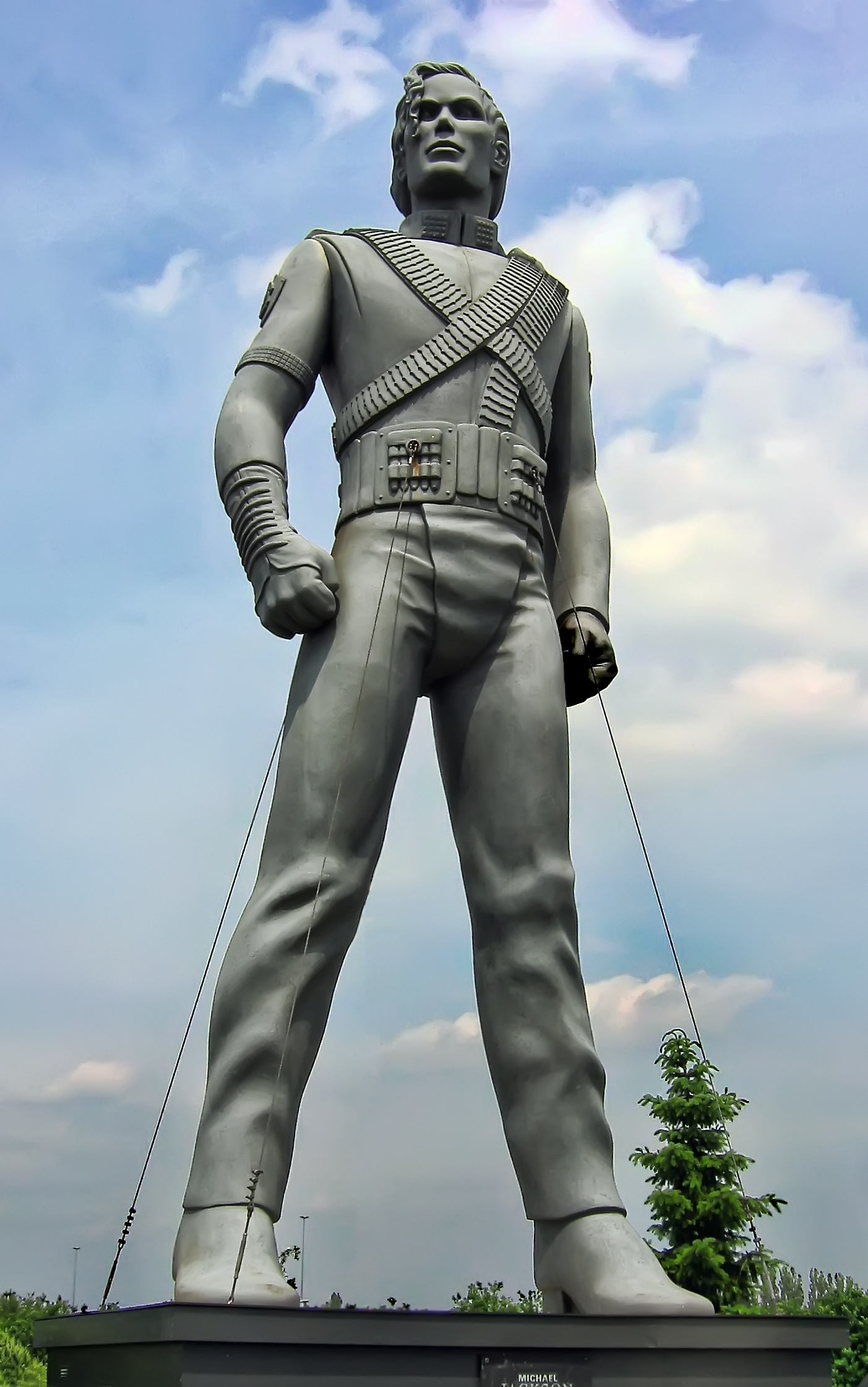
One of several 30-foot statues placed around Europe to promote the HIStory World Tour—the accompanying tour for Michael Jackson's HIStory (1995)

Released	Album	Artist (s)	Record label	Budget, expenditure	Adjusted cost (in 2025 dollars)	Ref.
1995	HIStory: Past, Present and Future, Book I	Michael Jackson	Sony / Epic Records	$30,000,000	$63,387,202	
2001	Invincible	Michael Jackson	Sony / Epic Records	$25,000,000	$45,456,681	
2013	Artpop	Lady Gaga	Interscope Records	$25,000,000	$34,553,571	
1999	Brand New Day	Sting	A&M Records	$18,900,000	$36,527,667	
1999	The Life of Chris Gaines	Garth Brooks	Capitol Records	$15,000,000	$28,990,212	
2000	1	The Beatles	Apple Records / EMI	$15,068,493	$28,171,530	
2002	ELV1S: 30 No. 1 Hits	Elvis Presley	RCA Records	$10,000,000	$17,900,093	

=== Overview ===
Michael Jackson's HIStory (1995) has the most extensive marketing campaign in popular music history, spent by a record label. Up to that point, a label might spent an average of $2 million in promotional campaigns for artists such as the Rolling Stones, Aerosmith and Madonna, per release. The lattermost, had the biggest Warner Records promotional campaign for an album up to the release of Like a Prayer (1989) with $2 million. In contrast, according to Hank Bordowitz in Dirty Little Secrets of the Record Business (2007), mounting a successful promotional campaign for radio stations can cost between $250,000 and $1 million per song.

Examples of associated campaigns outside record label's efforts include Born This Way (2011) by Lady Gaga, with a reported sum of $3 million provided by Amazon, and Rihanna's sponsorship with Samsung for $25 million which covered the release of her album Anti (2016) and its tour.

== List of album covers/packaging by cost ==
This is a list of record-breaking historical expensive album covers or CD packaging.

- Elvis Presley (1956) – reportedly was the most expensive album cover ever up to that point.
- Sgt. Pepper's Lonely Hearts Club Band (1967) – the cover, costing £25,000, was reportedly the most expensive cover design up to this time. (Note: Also cited with a cost at £3,000.) Most covers up to that point had a cost of about £50.
- Aladdin Sane (1973) – reportedly was the most expensive album cover ever up to that point.

== See also ==
- Hollywood accounting
- Lists of most expensive items by category
  - List of most expensive music videos
  - List of largest music deals
- List of most expensive films

== Book sources ==
- Dillon, Mark (2012). Fifty Sides of the Beach Boys: The Songs That Tell Their Story. ECW Press. ISBN 978-1-77090-198-8.
- Love, Mike (2016). Good Vibrations: My Life as a Beach Boy. Penguin Publishing Group. ISBN 978-0-698-40886-9.
- McCulley, Jerry (1997). Abbott, Kingsley (ed.). Back to the Beach: A Brian Wilson and the Beach Boys Reader. Helter Skelter. ISBN 978-1-900924-02-3.
