= List of largest music deals =

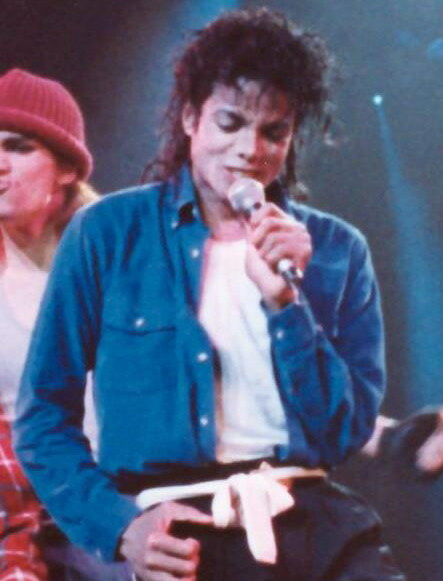
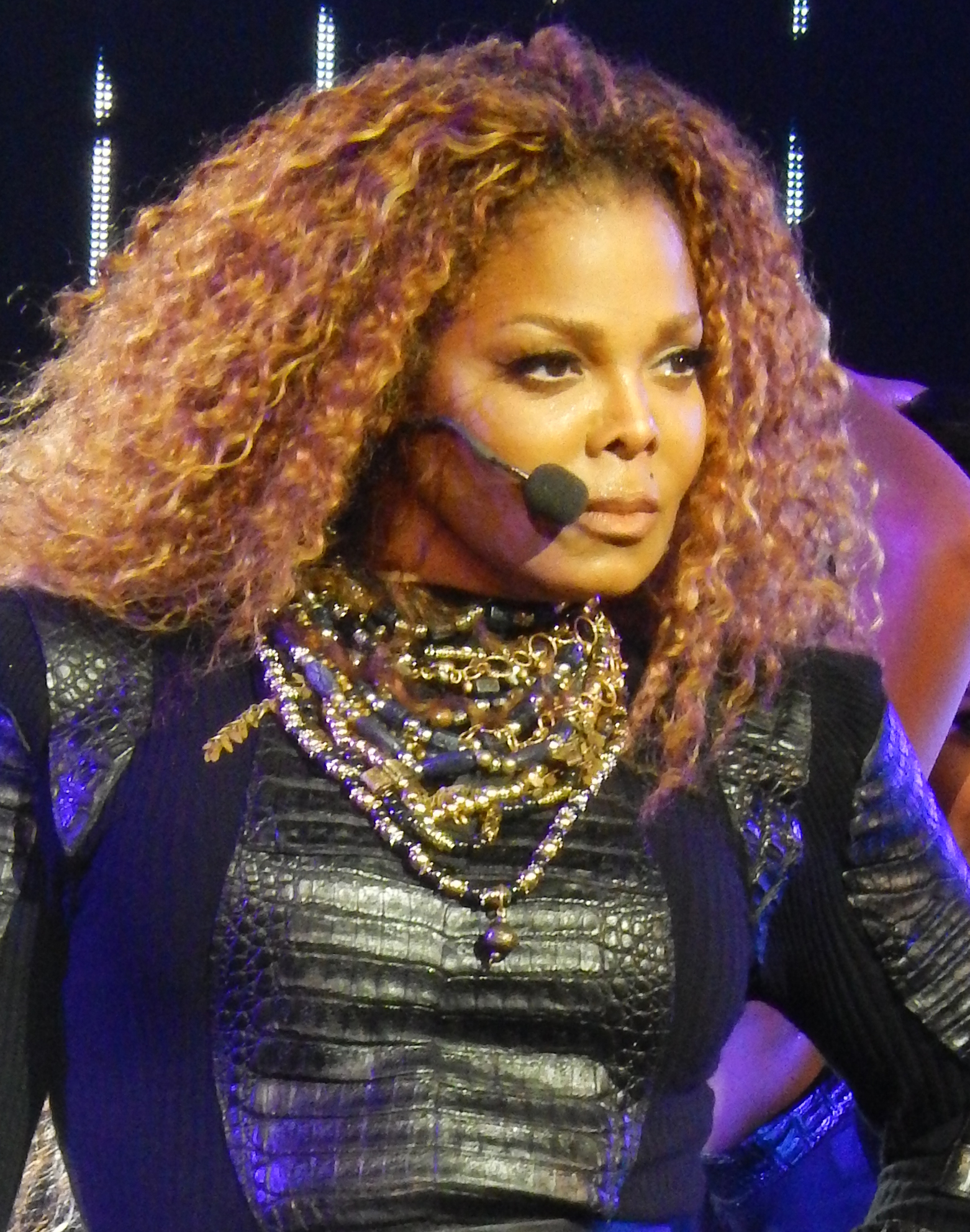
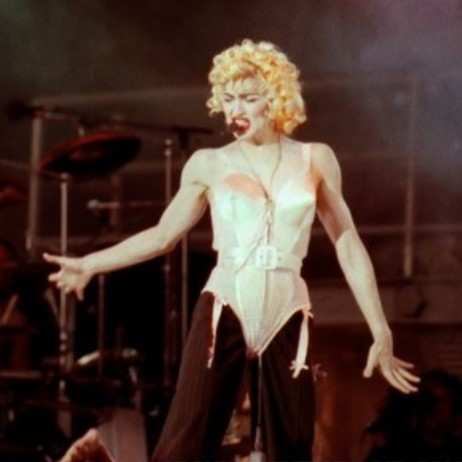
Michael Jackson (left), Janet Jackson (center), and Madonna (right) are the only artists to appear twice, with Michael's estate further making multiple multi-million-sized posthumous deals.

The following is a list of the largest music deals in history signed by artists, including recording contracts and multi-rights agreements with over US$50 million, as well as catalog acquisitions with a reported sum of over US$150 million. (Note: The list excludes sponsorship deals, broadcasting rights, assets, or other business ventures made by recording artists with enterprises outside of the industry) Some figures might not be entirely accurate, as some multi-million-dollar contracts were reportedly misrepresented or exaggerated, while others were based on media estimates. Therefore, no rankings are given.

In 1960, The Everly Brothers signed a 10-year contract with Warner Brothers Records for a deal which was reputed to be the first million-dollar contract in music history, although later accounts have reported a lower actual value. The Rolling Stones' 1971 deal with Atlantic Records represented "a new benchmark in industry contracts", according to a Billboard article, becoming the largest contract ever made by that point. The 1970s saw a rise in million-dollar recording contracts: Neil Diamond signed a $4–5 million deal with Columbia Records in 1972, which was superseded in 1974 by Paul McCartney's Capitol Records and Elton John's MCA Records each valued at $8 million, as well as Stevie Wonder's 1975 deal with Motown, valued at $13 million, (Note: Also reported for an amount of $37 million.) setting a new peak for the industry. The 1980s saw more contracts of eight figures, including record-breaking Diana Ross' $20 million contract with RCA Records in 1980, or the Rolling Stones with CBS Records for $28 million in 1983. An increase of blockbuster deals began in the 1990s, with top-signing artists such as Janet Jackson, Michael Jackson, Madonna and Prince each exceeding the $40–60 million marks, making multiple appearances in the Guinness World Records. Up until 2016, only a few recording and multi-rights contracts outpaced the $100 million mark.

The largest music deals belong to catalog acquisitions which include songwriting and publishing rights, with an increase in the late 2010s and early 2020s. The Estate of Michael Jackson made the largest recording deal, for a $250 million contract starting in 2010, and renewed in 2018 for the same amount, while Sony Music acquired the Queen catalog and a number of other rights, excluding touring revenue, for $1.27 billion, the largest sum ever paid for an artist's body of work.

Several multi-million-sized dollar music deals attracted scrutiny, criticism or became the subject of contractual disputes, (Note: Examples:) including Prince's 1992 agreement with Warner Bros., which later became the subject of a contractual dispute. In 1992, an editor of the Telegraph Herald criticized the large recording contracts offered to mainstream artists, commenting, "the goal wasn't to improve the music, it was to generate the most hype". A contributor from Forbes described Mariah Carey's 2001 agreement with Virgin Records as "the best-known and most-cited example" that did not proceed as initially intended. The New York Times reported that it marked "the first time that a major music corporation decided to cut its losses on a superstar agreement".

== Legend ==
Color
| Posthumous deal |

== List of largest recording contracts and multi-right deals ==
| Year | Artist | Music company | Approx deal | Notes | Ref. |
|---|---|---|---|---|---|
| 2022 | Drake | Universal Music Group | $400 million | Described as a "LeBron-sized" deal, the contract covered recordings, publishing, merchandise, and visual media. | |
| 2017 | Michael Jackson (Estate) | Sony | $250 million | The Estate of Michael Jackson extended the 2010 deal for an additional 7 years, effective January 2018 onwards. | |
| 2010 | Michael Jackson (Estate) | Sony | $250 million | Reportedly the largest recording deal; The Estate of Michael Jackson signed a $250 million contract with Sony Music, spanning 2010-2017. | |
| 1993 | U2 | Island Records | $200–100 million | Undisclosed price and likely exaggerated. Included worldwide rights to six albums. | |
| 2008 | Jay-Z | Live Nation | $150 million | Included seed funding for Roc Nation. | |
| 2012 | Lil Wayne | Cash Money Records | $150 million | Contract extension for four albums. | |
| 2016 | Adele | Columbia Records | $130 million | Originally reported by British tabloid The Sun. Undisclosed amount according to others. | |
| 2002 | Robbie Williams | EMI Records | $125 million | Labeled as the largest British record deal in history. | |
| 2007 | Madonna | Live Nation | $120 million | Labeled as the largest contract deal in history by a female artist. | |
| 1992 | Prince | Warner Bros | $100 million | Undisclosed price. | |
| 1995 | Michael Jackson | Sony Music | $100 Million | Formed Sony Music Publishing. | |
| 2001 | Whitney Houston | Arista Records | $100 million | Considered the largest contract in music at that point. | |
| 2001 | Mariah Carey | Virgin Records | $100–80 million | Considered the largest contract in music at that point. | |
| 2008 | Shakira | Live Nation | $100–70 million | 10-year, 360 deal. | |
| 1996 | R.E.M. | Warner Records | $80 million | Considered the largest contract made by a band and in music industry at that time. | |
| 1996 | Janet Jackson | Virgin Records | $80–70 million | Considered the largest contract in music at that point. | |
| 2016 | Harry Styles | Columbia Records | $80 million | Sum not confirmed. | |
| 2008 | Nickelback | Live Nation | $70–50 million | 360 deal. | |
| 1991 | Michael Jackson | Sony Music | $65–60–50 million (Note: Michael Jackson's 1991 deal with Sony was valued differently in contemporary reports. Figures ranged from $50 million to $60 million, with some sources reporting $65 million. Reports also cited a potential value of up to $1 billion, based on Sony's projections of the revenue the agreement could generate.) | Considered the largest contract in music at that point. | |
| 1991 | Paul McCartney | Capitol Records | $65 million | Considered the largest contract in music at that point. | |
| 1992 | Madonna | Warner Records | $60–50 million | Considered the largest contract in music for a female pop entertainer at that time. | |
| 1992 | Barbra Streisand | Columbia Records | $60–40 million | | |
| 1995 | Metallica | Elektra Records | $60 million | | |
| 1999 | Backstreet Boys | Jive Records | $60 million | | |
| 2022 | YoungBoy Never Broke Again | Motown | $60 million | | |
| 1998 | U2 | PolyGram | $50 million | | |
| 1991 | Janet Jackson | Virgin Records | $50–40–32 million | Considered the largest contract in music at that point. | |

== List of largest music catalog acquisitions ==
| Year | Artist | Purchaser company | Approx deal | Notes | Ref. |
|---|---|---|---|---|---|
| 2024 | Queen | Sony Music Publishing | $1.27 billion | The deal comprises Queen's recorded music catalog and additional rights, including royalties from the film Bohemian Rhapsody, valued at US$1.27 billion, the largest sum ever paid for an artist's body of work, excluding touring revenue. | |
| 2016 | Michael Jackson (Estate) | Sony Music Publishing | $750 million | Michael Jackson's estate has sold his 50% stake in Sony/ATV Music Publishing, which includes the music catalogues of several artists, notably the Beatles. | |
| 2024 | Michael Jackson (Estate) | Sony Music | $600 million | 50% acquisition. Considered the biggest transaction ever struck for half of a single artist's body of work. This puts total value of rights at $1.2 billion. | |
| 2021 | Bruce Springsteen | Sony Music | $550–500 million | Included more than 300 songs, 20 studio albums, 23 live LPs, 7 EPs, and more. | |
| 2020 | Pink Floyd | Sony Music | $400 million | The deal includes Pink Floyd's recorded music catalog, as well as their name, image, and likeness rights, but excludes music publishing assets | |
| 2020 | Bob Dylan | Universal Music Group | $400–300 million | Undisclosed price. It is a songwriting catalog agreement. | |
| 2022 | Phil Collins; Genesis | Concord Music Group | $300 million | | |
| 2021 | Sting | Universal Music Publishing Group | $300 million | | |
| 2018 | Michael Jackson (Estate) | Sony | $287 million | Michael Jackson's estate sold its 10% stake in EMI Music Publishing to Sony. | |
| 2021 | Paul Simon | Sony Music Publishing | $250 million | | |
| 2022 | David Bowie | Warner Chappell Music | $250 million | | |
| 2023 | Katy Perry | Litmus Music | $225 million | | |
| 2023 | Justin Bieber | Recognition Music Group | $200 million | | |
| 2026 | Sia | Pophouse Entertainment | $180 million | Sia sold a 50% stake in her music catalog for $180 million. The deal includes both her publishing and master recording rights, placing an implied value of $360 million on her full catalog. | |
| 2021 | Neil Young | Recognition Music Group | $150 million | | |
| 2022 | Bob Dylan | Sony Music | $150 million | | |

== See also ==
- Hollywood accounting
- Lists of most expensive items by category
  - List of most expensive albums
  - List of most expensive celebrity photographs
  - List of most valuable records
- Forbes list of highest-earning musicians

Cases

- Panayiotou v Sony Music Entertainment (UK) Ltd.
- Taylor Swift masters dispute
