= A 50 Singles: Live Selection =

Ayumi Hamasaki A 50 Singles: Live Selection

Video by Ayumi Hamasaki
- Released: April 20, 2011
- Genre: J-Pop
- Label: Avex

Ayumi Hamasaki chronology
Rock'n'Roll Circus Tour Final: 7days Special (2011)	Ayumi Hamasaki A 50 Singles: Live Selection (2011)	Ayumi Hamasaki Countdown Live 2010–2011 A: Do It Again

Ayumi Hamasaki A 50 Singles: Live Selection is 27th live DVD by Ayumi Hamasaki, released on April 20, 2011. It is the compilation of her 50 best live performances selected from each of her singles, from her 1st single, Poker Face, to her 50th single, L. It was released on the same day with Ayumi Hamasaki Rock 'n' Roll Circus Tour Final: 7 Days Special. It was originally scheduled to be released at March 30, but was pushed back till April 20 due to the 2011 Tohoku earthquake and tsunami. It charted strongly at #2 while Ayumi Hamasaki Rock 'n' Roll Circus Tour Final: 7 Days Special charted at #1, making her the first artist to hold #1 and #2 positions on the Oricon DVD Weekly Chart. The sales of this 2 DVD make her the female artist with the highest DVD sales of 2,313,000 units sold, behind Arashi. As her song, Kanariya, had not been performed live before, it was replaced as a video clip.

== Track list ==
Disc 1 and 2:

1. Poker Face (Ayumi Hamasaki A Museum: 30th Single Collection Live)
2. You (Ayumi Hamasaki A Museum: 30th Single Collection Live)
3. Trust (Ayumi Hamasaki Concert Tour 2000 A (Vol.1))
4. For My Dear... (Ayumi Hamasaki Premium Countdown Live 2008-2009 A)
5. Depend On You (Ayumi Hamasaki Asia Tour 2008: 10th Anniversary)
6. Whatever (Ayumi Hamasaki Countdown Live 2004-2005)
7. Love: Destiny (Ayumi Hamasaki Concert Tour 2000 A (Vol.2))
8. To Be (Ayumi Hamasaki Concert Tour 2000 A (Vol.1))
9. Boys & Girls (Ayumi Hamasaki Arena Tour 2005: My Story)
10. Trauma (Ayumi Hamasaki Arena Tour 2000 A (Vol.1))
11. Appears ((Ayumi Hamasaki Arena Tour 2007 A: Tour of Secret)
12. Kanariya (Video Clip)
13. Fly High (Ayumi Hamasaki Countdown Live 2000-2001 A)
14. Vogue (Ayumi Hamasaki Dome Tour 2001 A)
15. Far away (Ayumi Hamasaki Concert Tour 2000 A (Vol.1))
16. Seasons (Ayumi Hamasaki Concert Tour 2000 A (Vol.2))
17. Surreal (Ayumi Hamasaki Stadium Tour 2002 A)
18. Audience (Ayumi Hamasaki Stadium Tour 2002 A)
19. M (Ayumi Hamasaki A Museum: 30th Single Collection Live)
20. Evolution (Ayumi Hamasaki Dome Tour 2001 A)
21. Never Ever (Ayumi Hamasaki Best of Countdown Live 2006-2007 A)
22. Endless Sorrow (Ayumi Hamasaki Countdown Live 2005-2006 A)
23. Unite! (Ayumi Hamasaki Dome Tour 2001 A)
24. Dearest (Ayumi Hamasaki Countdown Live 2001-2002 A)
25. Daybreak (Ayumi Hamasaki Arena Tour 2002 A)
26. Free & Easy (Ayumi Hamasaki Best of Countdown Live 2006-2007 A)
27. Independent (Ayumi Hamasaki Stadium Tour 2002 A)
28. Voyage (Ayumi Hamasaki Asia Tour 2008: 10th Anniversary)
29. Ourselves (Ayumi Hamasaki Arena Tour 2003-2004 A)
30. Forgiveness (Ayumi Hamasaki A Museum: 30th Single Collection Live)
31. No Way To Say (Ayumi Hamasaki Arena Tour 2003-2004 A)
32. Moments (Ayumi Hamasaki Arena Tour 2005 A: My Story)
33. Inspire (Ayumi Hamasaki Arena Tour 2005 A: My Story)
34. Carols (Ayumi Hamasaki Arena Tour 2005 A: My Story)
35. Step You (Ayumi Hamasaki Arena Tour 2006 A: (Miss)Understood)
36. Fairyland (Ayumi Hamasaki Countdown Live 2005-2006 A)
37. Heaven (Ayumi Hamasaki Countdown Live 2005-2006 A)
38. Bold & Delicious (Ayumi Hamasaki Arena Tour 2006 A: (Miss)Understood)
39. Startin' (Ayumi Hamasaki Countdown Live 2009-2010 A: Future Classics)
40. Blue Bird (Ayumi Hamasaki Best of Countdown Live 2006-2007)
41. glitter (Ayumi Hamasaki Countdown Live 2007-2008 Anniversary)
42. Talkin' 2 Myself (Ayumi Hamasaki Asia Tour 2008: 10th Anniversary)
43. Mirrorcle World (Ayumi Hamasaki Asia Tour 2008: 10th Anniversary)
44. Days (Ayumi Hamasaki Arena Tour 2009 A: Next Level)
45. Rule (Ayumi Hamasaki Arena Tour 2009 A: Next Level)
46. Sunrise: Love is all Ayumi Hamasaki Arena Tour 2009 A: Next Level)
47. You Were... (Ayumi Hamasaki Countdown Live 2009-2010 A: Future Classics)
48. Moon (Ayumi Hamasaki Rock 'n' Roll Circus Tour Final: 7 Days Special)
49. Crossroad (A-Nation'10)
50. Virgin Road (Ayumi Hamasaki Rock 'n' Roll Circus Tour Final: 7 Days Special)

== Charts ==
Oricon DVD Chart (Japan)

Release	Chart	Peak position	Debut sales	Sales total
April 20, 2011	Oricon Daily Charts	1		
April 20, 2011	Oricon Weekly Charts	2	33,874	66,239

G-Music DVD Chart (Taiwan)

Release	Chart	Peak position	Percentage sales
May 6, 2011	G-Music DVD Chart	2	3.97%
