= Pyar Kiya To Darna Kya =

Song by Naushad, Shakeel Badayuni and Lata Mangeshkar
- Language: Hindustani
- Released: 5 August 1960
- Recorded: 1960
- Genre: Bollywood film song
- Length: 6:21
- Composer: Naushad
- Lyricist: Shakeel Badayuni

Music video
- "Pyar Kiya To Darna Kya" on YouTube

"Pyar Kiya To Darna Kya" (transl. Why fear when in love?) is a song from the 1960 Hindi film Mughal-e-Azam, directed by K. Asif. The song is composed by Naushad, written by Shakeel Badayuni, and sung by Lata Mangeshkar with a chorus. It is picturised on Madhubala, who plays the role of the beautiful courtesan Anarkali in the film. It is shot in technicolour.

== Development ==
The composition of "Pyar Kiya To Darna Kya" was especially time-consuming – on the day of the song's recording, Naushad rejected two sets of lyrics made by Shakeel Badayuni. Subsequently, a "brainstorming session" was held on Naushad's terrace, beginning in the early part of the evening and lasting until next day. Late in the night, Naushad remembered a folk song from eastern Uttar Pradesh with the lyrics going as "Prem kiya, kya chori kari hai..." ("I have loved, does it mean that I have stolen?"). The song was converted into a ghazal and subsequently recorded. It was also one of Lata's Urdu songs, which she had sung after taking Urdu lessons to [sic] improve her diction.

== Form and meaning ==
The song starts with a vocal rendition in the classical style by noted classical singer of the time, Bade Ghulam Ali. His part in the song is meant to represent the voice of Tansen, one of Akbar's Nine Jewels, considered to have had the ability to bring rain from the sky and light candles in the dark with his singing. This rendition is followed by a solo by Lata Mangeshkar, composed as an ode by the lead character in the film, Anarkali, to the Prince for whom she declares her love. She does this in front of the King and the whole court, knowing well enough that the king is opposed to their love and such an open declaration might be considered as rebellion.

In many lines of the song, the courtesan taunts the great emperor by repeatedly declaring her refusal to hide her true feelings even in the face of likely death. The song ends with a chorus singing the refrain (the titular "Pyar Kiya Toh Darna Kya").

== Filming ==
The song "Pyar Kiya To Darna Kya" was filmed in a set inspired by the Sheesh Mahal of the Lahore Fort, in the Mohan Studios. The particular set was noted for its size, which measured 150 feet in length, 80 feet in breadth and 35 feet in height. A heavily discussed aspect of the set was the presence of numerous small mirrors made of Belgian glass, which were crafted and designed by workers from Firozabad. The set took two years to build and cost more than ₹1.5 million ($320,000), equivalent to $3 million (₹220 million) adjusted for inflation.

The sequence cost more than ₹1 million to execute, a price higher than the budget of an entire film at that time. The high cost increased fears that the financiers of the film would face bankruptcy. It was the most expensive Indian music video up until then, and remained the most expensive for around two decades.
