= List of most expensive U.S. public works projects =

Below is a list of so-called megaprojects that are among the most expensive in U.S. history.

== Highways ==
The following list includes projects to build new highways or improve existing ones, including roadways, bridges, and tunnels. It includes only projects that are underway or completed. Additionally, projects with multiple independent segments (e.g., I-69 Indiana-Texas Extension, Trans-Texas Corridor) are not included, though individual segments may or may not make the list. Costs shown below exclude financing costs.

Date	Price (nominal)	Reference Year	Price (ref. year)	Price (2025 Inflation)	Project
1956–present	$425 billion	2006	$425 billion	$679 billion	Interstate Highway System
1992–2006	$14.6 billion	1982	$8.08 billion	$27 billion	Big Dig, Boston, Massachusetts
2000–2022	$1.4 billion	2022			I-5 - SR 16 Tacoma/Pierce County HOV Program, Tacoma, Washington (Interstate 5 in Washington)
2002–2013	$6.5 billion			$8.98 billion	San Francisco–Oakland Bay Bridge East Span Replacement, San Francisco/Oakland, California
1988–2002	$5.0 billion				Mon–Fayette Expressway, southwest Pennsylvania and northern West Virginia
2012–2019	$4.25 billion				Alaskan Way Viaduct replacement tunnel, Seattle, Washington
2005–2020 (est.)	$4.1 billion (est.)				Ohio River Bridges Project, Louisville, Kentucky, and southern Indiana
2020-2025 (est.)	$3.9 billion (est.)				Hampton Roads Bridge–Tunnel, Hampton Roads, Virginia
2001–2007	$3.6 billion				Central Texas Turnpike, area around Austin, Texas
2003–2008	$1.5 billion	2001	$2.8 billion (2008)	$3.1 billion	I-10 Katy Freeway Expansion (Interstate 10 in Texas)
2007–2011	$2.57 billion				Intercounty Connector, Montgomery County, Maryland
1997–2029	$1.66 billion	2009	$2.2 billion	$3.35 billion	North Spokane Corridor, Spokane County, Washington
1999–2008	$2.5 billion				Woodrow Wilson Bridge Replacement, Washington, D.C., Northern Virginia, and southern Maryland
1959–1964	$320 million	1964		$2.44 billion	Verrazzano–Narrows Bridge
2015–2022	$2.3 billion (est.)				I-4 Ultimate corridor reconstruction, Orlando, Florida
2008–2018	$1.8 billion (est.)				Interstate 69 Extension SIU #3, Evansville to Indianapolis, Indiana
2010–2024	$1.6 billion (est.)				Wekiva Parkway, Orlando, Florida
2001–2016	$1.4 billion (est.)				I-95 New Haven Harbor Corridor Reconstruction, New Haven, Connecticut
1991–2003	$1.2 billion				E-470, Denver, Colorado
1933–2007	$37 million	1937	$37 million	$829 million	Golden Gate Bridge

== Rail ==
Date	Price (nominal)	Reference Year	Price (ref. year)	Price (2025 Inflation)	Project	Length
2015–2029	$64.2 billion (est.)	2018	$64.2 billion (est.)	$88.7 billion (est.)	California High-Speed Rail (Phase 1)	520 miles (837 km)
2006–2025	$4 billion (est.)	2006	$12.4 billion (est.)	$11.2 billion (est.)	Skyline	20 miles (32 km)
1964–1976	$1.588 billion	1976	$1.586 billion	$8.97 billion	Bay Area Rapid Transit (Initial System)	109 miles (175 km)
1863–1869	$124,548,691	1873	$124,548,691	$3.35 billion	First transcontinental railroad	1,868 miles (3,006 km)

== See also ==
- Megaproject
