= Ayumi Hamasaki Countdown Live 2009–2010 A: Future Classics =

Video by Ayumi Hamasaki
- Released: July 14, 2010
- Genre: J-pop
- Label: Avex

Ayumi Hamasaki chronology
Ayumi Hamasaki Arena Tour 2009 A: Next Level (2010)	Ayumi Hamasaki Countdown Live 2009–2010 A: Future Classics (2010)	Ayumi Hamasaki Rock 'n' Roll Circus Tour Final: 7 Days Special (2011)

Ayumi Hamasaki Countdown Live 2009–2010 A: Future Classics is Japanese pop singer Ayumi Hamasaki's 9th Countdown concert DVD.

== Track list ==
1. I am...
2. Moments
3. Step you
4. Energize
5. About You
6. momentum
7. You were...
8. Pride
9. Inspire
10. Because of You
11. 1 Love
12. until that Day...
13. Humming 7/4
14. evolution
15. Startin'

=== Encore ===
1. Teddy Bear
2. Sunrise ~Love Is All~
3. Boys & Girls
4. Red Line ~for TA~

== Total reported sales ==
56,544

== Oricon week ranks ==
1st Week: #2
