= Ayumi Hamasaki Countdown Live 2005–2006 A =

Ayumi Hamasaki Countdown Live 2005-2006 A

Video by Ayumi Hamasaki
- Released: March 23, 2006
- Genre: J-pop

Ayumi Hamasaki chronology
Ayumi Hamasaki Arena Tour 2005 A (2005)	Ayumi Hamasaki Countdown Live 2005-2006 A (2006)	Ayumi Hamasaki Arena Tour 2006 A (2006)

Ayumi Hamasaki Countdown Live 2005–2006 A is a DVD issued by a Japanese singer Ayumi Hamasaki. It was released on 23 March 2006. It is well-known for its performance of Boys & Girls in which Hamasaki forgets the lyrics.

== Track listing ==
1. Opening
2. STEP you
3. SURREAL
4. UNITE!
5. fairyland
6. Endless sorrow
7. Because of You
8. theme of a-nation '03
9. evolution
10. flower garden
11. Humming 7/4
12. Boys & Girls
13. Bold & Delicious

=== Encore ===
1. rainy day
2. LOVE 〜Destiny〜
3. HEAVEN
4. Startin'
5. Trauma
6. winding road
