= Rock'n'Roll Circus Tour Final: 7days Special =

2010 concert tour by Ayumi Hamasaki

Ayumi Hamasaki Rock'n'Roll Circus Tour
- Domestic tour by Ayumi Hamasaki
- Location: Japan
- Associated album: Rock 'n' Roll Circus
- Start date: April 10, 2010
- End date: October 11, 2010
- Legs: 2
- No. of shows: 41

Ayumi Hamasaki concert chronology
- Ayumi Hamasaki Arena Tour 2009 A: Next Level (2009); Ayumi Hamasaki Rock'n'Roll Circus Tour (2010); Ayumi Hamasaki Power of Music 2011 A (2011)

Ayumi Hamasaki Rock 'n' Roll Circus Tour is the thirteenth concert tour by Japanese recording artist Ayumi Hamasaki, held in support of her eleventh studio album, Rock 'n' Roll Circus (2010). The concert tour, which began at the Saitama Super Arena on April 10, 2010, spanned 41 performances throughout Japan. It concluded at the Yoyogi National Gymnasium on October 11, 2010, drawing an audience of approximately 400,000 people.

== Concert dates ==
Date (2010)	City	Venue	Attendance
April 10	Saitama	Saitama Super Arena	400,000
April 11	Saitama	Saitama Super Arena	400,000
April 17	Nagoya	Nippon Gaishi Hall	400,000
April 18	Nagoya	Nippon Gaishi Hall	400,000
April 22	Osaka	Osaka-jō Hall	400,000
April 24	Osaka	Osaka-jō Hall	400,000
April 25	Osaka	Osaka-jō Hall	400,000
April 29	Niigata	Toki Messe Niigata	400,000
May 3	Nagano	Big Hat	400,000
May 4	Nagano	Big Hat	400,000
May 8	Fukuoka	Marine Messe Fukuoka	400,000
May 9	Fukuoka	Marine Messe Fukuoka	400,000
May 15	Saitama	Saitama Super Arena	400,000
May 16	Saitama	Saitama Super Arena	400,000
May 22	Osaka	Osaka-jō Hall	400,000
May 23	Osaka	Osaka-jō Hall	400,000
May 29	Nagoya	Nippon Gaishi Hall	400,000
May 30	Nagoya	Nippon Gaishi Hall	400,000
June 5	Enchizen	Fukui Sandomu	400,000
June 6	Enchizen	Fukui Sandomu	400,000
June 12	Shizuoka	Shizuoka Ekopaarina	400,000
June 13	Shizuoka	Shizuoka Ekopaarina	400,000
June 19	Hiroshima	Hiroshima Green Arena	400,000
June 20	Hiroshima	Hiroshima Green Arena	400,000
June 26	Nagoya	Nippon Gaishi Hall	400,000
June 27	Nagoya	Nippon Gaishi Hall	400,000
July 3	Fukuoka	Marine Messe Fukuoka	400,000
July 4	Fukuoka	Marine Messe Fukuoka	400,000
July 10	Miyagi	Sekisui Heim Super Arena	400,000
July 11	Miyagi	Sekisui Heim Super Arena	400,000
July 17	Kobe	World Memorial Hall	400,000
July 18	Kobe	World Memorial Hall	400,000
July 24	Tokyo	Yoyogi National Gymnasium	400,000
July 25	Tokyo	Yoyogi National Gymnasium	400,000
October 2	Tokyo	Yoyogi National Gymnasium	400,000
October 3	Tokyo	Yoyogi National Gymnasium	400,000
October 5	Tokyo	Yoyogi National Gymnasium	400,000
October 6	Tokyo	Yoyogi National Gymnasium	400,000
October 9	Tokyo	Yoyogi National Gymnasium	400,000
October 10	Tokyo	Yoyogi National Gymnasium	400,000
October 11	Tokyo	Yoyogi National Gymnasium	400,000

== Concert DVD ==
Ayumi Hamasaki Rock 'n' Roll Circus Tour Final: 7 Days Special

Video by Ayumi Hamasaki
- Released: April 20, 2011
- Genre: J-Pop/J-Rock
- Label: Avex

Ayumi Hamasaki chronology
Ayumi Hamasaki Countdown Live 2009-2010 A: Future Classics (2010)	Ayumi Hamasaki Rock 'n' Roll Circus Tour Final: 7 Days Special (2011)	Ayumi Hamasaki A 50 Singles: Live Selection (2011)

Ayumi Hamasaki Rock 'n' Roll Circus Tour Final: 7 Days Special is the thirteenth Concert DVD by Ayumi Hamasaki. It was released on April 20, 2011 the same day of the release of Ayumi Hamasaki A 50 Singles: Live Selection. This DVD was also release as a Blu-ray Disc. It was originally scheduled to be released at March 30, but was pushed back till April 20 due to the 2011 Tohoku earthquake and tsunami. It charted strong at #1 while Ayumi Hamasaki A 50 Singles: Live Selection charted behind, at #2, making her the first artist to hold #1 and #2 positions on the Oricon DVD Weekly Chart. The sales of these 2 DVDs made her the artist with the second highest DVD sales in Japan with 2,313,000 units sold, behind Arashi.

=== Track list ===
Disc 1:

1. Circus
2. The Introduction
3. Microphone
4. Last Angel
5. About You
6. Solitude
7. Rainy Day
8. Ballad
9. Moon
10. Rimbaud
11. Count Down
12. Memorial Address
13. Virgin Road
14. Memories
15. Don't Look back
16. Inspire
17. Because of You
18. The Carabet
19. Sexy Little Things
20. Step You
21. Jump!
22. Lady Dynamite
23. Until That Day...
24. Surreal ～Evolution～ Surreal

Disc 2:

1. Humming 7/4
2. Boys & Girls
3. Sweet Season
4. Seven Days War

Disc 3:

- MC compilation of whole concert
- Behind-the-scenes footage

== Charts ==
Oricon DVD Chart (Japan)

Release	Chart	Peak position	Debut sales	Sales total	Chart run
April 20, 2011	Oricon Daily Charts	1			
April 20, 2011	Oricon Weekly Charts	1	38,319	53,249	11 weeks
April 20, 2011	Oricon Yearly Charts				

G-Music DVD Chart (Taiwan)

Release	Chart	Peak position	Percentage Sales	Chart run
May 6, 2011	G-Music DVD Chart	1	6.74%	6 Weeks
