= List of most expensive celebrity photographs =

This is a list of the most expensive celebrity photographs as determined by the fees paid to the subjects, or often their parents, for permission to publish them.

Type	Person(s)	Publication(s)	Publication date	Reported price	Ref
Baby photos	Knox Leon and Vivienne Marcheline Jolie-Pitt	People & Hello!	August 2008	$15,000,000	
Baby photos	Oskar Jacob Muñiz and Maximilian David	People	March 2008	$6,000,000	
Baby photos	Shiloh Nouvel Jolie-Pitt	People	June 2006	$4,100,000	
Wedding photos	Demi Moore and Ashton Kutcher	OK!	October 2005	$3,000,000	
Baby photos	Levi Alves McConaughey	OK!	August 2008	$3,000,000	
Baby photos	Prince Jackson	National Enquirer	March 1997	$2,000,000	
Baby photos	Sabrina Sakaë Mottola	¡Hola!	November 2007	$2,000,000	
Post-adoption photos	Pax Thien Jolie-Pitt	People	March 2007	$2,000,000	
Post-paternity case photos	Larry and Dannielynn Birkhead	OK!	April 2007	$2,000,000	
Wedding photos	Eva Longoria and Tony Parker	OK!	July 2007	$2,000,000	
Baby photos	Max Liron Bratman	People	February 2008	$1,500,000	
Wedding photos	David Beckham and Victoria Beckham	OK!	July 1999	£1,000,000	
Baby photos	Honor Marie Warren	OK!	July 2008	$1,500,000	
Wedding photos	Elizabeth Taylor and Larry Fortensky	People	October 1991	$1,000,000	
Wedding photos	Anna Nicole Smith and Howard K. Stern	People	September 2006	$1,000,000	
Baby photos	Maddie Briann Aldridge	OK!	July 2008	$1,000,000	
Baby photos	Harlow Winter Kate Madden	People	February 2008	$1,000,000	
Baby photos	Kingston James McGregor Rossdale	OK!	June 2006	$575,000	
Couple photos	Angelina Jolie and Brad Pitt	Us Weekly	April 2005	$500,000	
Baby photos	Sean Preston Federline	People	November 2005	$500,000	
Visibly pregnant photos	Angelina Jolie	People	January 2006	$500,000	
Last photo	Daniel Smith	In Touch	September 2006	$400,000	
Baby photos	Matthew Alejandro Mottola	¡Hola!	September 2011	$300,000	

== See also ==
- Lists of most expensive items by category
  - List of most valuable celebrity memorabilia
