= Step You/Is This Love? =

Single by Ayumi Hamasaki

from the album (Miss)understood
- Released: April 20, 2005
- Length: 18:27
- Label: Avex Trax
- Composers: Kazuhiro Hara; Miki Watanabe
- Lyricist: Ayumi Hamasaki
- Producer: Max Matsuura

Ayumi Hamasaki singles chronology
"Carols" (2004)	"Step You/Is This Love?" (2005)	"Fairyland" (2005)

Official music video
- "Step You" on YouTube

Official music video
- "Is This Love?" on YouTube

Official music video
- "My Name's Women" on YouTube

"Step You"/"Is This Love?" is the 35th single released by Ayumi Hamasaki. It was a double a-side single released on April 20, 2005. "Step You"/"Is This Love?" was the first single released by Ayumi Hamasaki in 2005. "Step you"/"is this Love?" was the best-selling solo single of 2005 by a female artist until September 2005, when Mika Nakashima's "Glamorous Sky" outsold it. The DVD featured 3 PVs, including one for "Step You", "Is This Love?", and also for "My Name's Women" from Hamasaki's 2004 album, My Story. Chiharu and Etsu from TRF were featured alongside Ayu in the PV. The "My Name's Women" PV is currently the second most expensive music video by a Japanese artist, behind Hamasaki's "Fairyland" PV. To date, the single has sold over 345,000 copies, making it her best-selling single of 2005.

== Music videos ==
The PV for Step You begins with a man walking up to a music box-like contraption. As he activates the levers (shown as I, II, III, and IV) four miniature versions of Ayumi appear. Each of the four wears a different colour and displays a different personality. The blue sings in a cute manner, the black cold, the white shy and the red seductive. As the man activates the last lever, the contraption begins to short-circuit, and the four Ayumis turn into one who sings in the rain wearing yellow.

The PV for Is This Love? features Ayumi singing emotionally in an apartment. It is implied that she possesses some sort of psychokinetic power and can destroy objects around her and restore them back to the original state at will. As she passes by, objects begin to explode (i.e. a mirror, a bowl of fruit, a fish tank, walls, lights etc.). But later these objects appear to be completely intact again. As she looks down the window, she sees a child about to be hit by a car. She comes to his rescue by blowing up the car. As the child is out of danger, the car is seen unscathed and drives off the scene. In the end Ayumi looks back at the apartment and in one piece it looks as if no destruction has ever happened.

== Track listing ==
=== CD ===
1. "Step You" – 4:24
2. "Is This Love?" – 4:51
3. "Step You" (Instrumental) – 4:24
4. "Is This Love?" (Instrumental) – 4:51

=== DVD ===
1. "Step You" (PV)
2. "Is This Love?" (PV)
3. "My Name's Women" (PV)

== Live performances ==
- April 13, 2005 – Minna no Terebi – "Step You"
- April 16, 2005 – CDTV – "Step You"
- April 22, 2005 – Music Fighter – "Step You"
- April 29, 2005 – Music Station – "Step you"
- May 6, 2005 – Music Station – "Step you" and "Is This Love?"
- December 31, 2005 – CDTV Special 2005-2006 – "Step You" and "Bold & Delicious"

== Charts ==
Oricon Sales Chart (Japan)

Release	Chart	Peak position	First week sales	Sales total	Chart run	Ref
April 20, 2005	Oricon Daily Singles Chart	1				
April 20, 2005	Oricon Weekly Singles Chart	1	164,008	385,000	19	
April 20, 2005	Oricon Monthly Singles Chart	1				
April 20, 2005	Oricon Yearly Singles Chart	19				

- Total Sales : 385,000 (Japan)
- Total Sales : 403,000 (Avex)
- RIAJ certification: Platinum

== See also ==
- List of most expensive music videos
