= Heaven (Ayumi Hamasaki song) =

Single by Ayumi Hamasaki

from the album (Miss)understood
- B-side: "Will"
- Released: September 14, 2005
- Genre: J-pop, pop
- Length: 27:35
- Label: Avex Trax
- Songwriters: Ayumi Hamasaki (lyrics); Kazuhito Kikuchi (music)
- Producer: Max Matsuura

Ayumi Hamasaki singles chronology
"Fairyland" (2005)	"Heaven" (2005)	"Bold & Delicious/Pride" (2005)

Official Music Video
- "Heaven" on YouTube

Alternative Cover
- CD+DVD

"Heaven" is the thirty-seventh single released by Ayumi Hamasaki, released on September 14, 2005. "Heaven" ended up selling over 325,000 copies, making it Hamasaki's second highest-selling single of 2005 as well as her last single to date that has sold over 300,000 physical copies. "Heaven" was used as the theme of the Japanese film Shinobi Heart Under Blade, while "Will" was used in a television commercial for Panasonic.

== Music video ==
The music video for "Heaven" features Ayumi singing alone in a subway. As she does, ghosts frequently pass by her. Near the end of the video, the spirits leave Ayumi and board on a train (implying their departure to heaven). The video is done entirely in one shot and in black and white.

== Track listing ==
CD

1. "Heaven" – 4:18
2. "Will" – 4:07
3. "Alterna" (orchestra version)
4. "Heaven" (piano version) – 4:18
5. "Heaven" (instrumental) – 4:18
6. "Will" (instrumental) – 4:07

DVD

1. "Heaven" (PV)
2. "Heaven" (photo gallery)
3. "Heaven" (TV-CM)

== Live performances ==
- September 9, 2005 – Music Station
- September 16, 2005 – Music Station
- September 16, 2005 – Music Fighter
- September 17, 2005 – CDTV
- September 23, 2005 – PopJam
- October 7, 2005 – Music Station
- December 23, 2005 – Music Station Super Live – "Heaven" and "Bold & Delicious"

== Chart performance ==
On the day of its release it reached the number-two position on the Oricon chart; the second day it was at number three. It reached stayed at the top position for the rest of the week, however. At the end of the week, the physical sales of "Heaven" was over 169,000 units, topping the weekly Oricon chart. Overall, it lasted for forty-six days in the top twenty of the Oricon daily charts over a forty-nine-day period; forty-two of them being consecutive.

Oricon Sales Chart (Japan)

Release	Chart	Peak position	First week sales	Sales total
14 September 2005	Oricon Daily Singles Chart	1		
14 September 2005	Oricon Weekly Singles Chart	1	168,540	370,000
14 September 2005	Oricon Monthly Singles Chart	3		
14 September 2005	Oricon Yearly Singles Chart	23		

- Total sales : 370,000 (Japan)
- RIAJ certification: Platinum
