= Bold & Delicious/Pride =

Single by Ayumi Hamasaki

from the album (Miss)understood
- B-side: "Pride"
- Released: November 30, 2005
- Genre: J-pop; R&B
- Length: 29:07
- Label: Avex Trax
- Songwriters: Ayumi Hamasaki (lyrics); Geo of Sweetbox (music)
- Producer: Max Matsuura

Ayumi Hamasaki singles chronology
"Heaven" (2005)	"Bold & Delicious/Pride" (2005)	"Startin'/Born to Be..." (2006)

Official Music Video
- "Bold & Delicious" on YouTube

Official Music Video
- "Pride" on YouTube

"Bold & Delicious" (2005)
Hamasaki took new directions on (Miss)understood, as epitomized by the single "Bold & Delicious", a funk-influenced song that used a gospel-style chorus.

"Bold & Delicious/Pride" is the 38th single released by Ayumi Hamasaki. It was released on November 30, 2005.

The song "Bold & Delicious" was originally composed by music producer Roberto "Geo" Rosan for the Los Angeles-based pop group Sweetbox, which achieved fame in Europe and Asia throughout the late 1990s and 2000s. A fan of the group's music, Hamasaki received permission from Geo to use a few of his compositions for her January 2006 album (miss)understood, adding her own lyrics for these songs. The original composition was later featured on the group's album entitled Addicted, released in Japan in March 2006.

== Music videos ==
Both promotional videos for "Bold & Delicious" and "Pride" were shot in New York.

In the video for "Bold & Delicious", Hamasaki is featured with long wavy black hair, and wears a faux fur jacket with a light pink dress. She is seen standing on the back of a moving truck driving through areas of New York City, evoking the iconic 1993 Björk music video for her single Big Time Sensuality. Some shots feature "behind the scenes" material, showing footage of the truck driving around the city and film crew members.

The video for "Pride" features several long takes of Hamasaki in a black dress being prepared by assistants and make-up artists, and then walking through an on-location set prepared under a New York City bridge and in the rain.

== Sales ==
"Bold & Delicious/Pride" debuted at #1 on the Oricon Singles Charts, making it her 25th #1 single, which tied her with Seiko Matsuda for the most #1 singles by a female artist at the time. It became her 13th #1 single in a row. Overall single sales, however, were lower than her most recent singles at the time. The single sold 83,708 copies in its first week, in comparison to her past several singles which had typically sold between 160,000 and 170,000 copies during their first week on the charts.

This was Hamasaki's weakest single (sales figures-wise) since "Forgiveness" in 2003 and her lowest selling single since her 1998 effort "Depend on You".

== Track listing ==
1. "Bold & Delicious" – 4:40
2. "Pride" – 4:10
3. "Heaven" (House Mix) – 6:15
4. "Will" (Wall5 Remix)
5. "Bold & Delicious" (Instrumental) – 4:40
6. "Pride" (Instrumental) – 4:10

== DVD track listing ==
1. "Bold & Delicious" (PV)
2. "Pride" (PV)

== Charts ==
Oricon Sales Chart (Japan)

Release	Chart	Peak position	First week sales	Sales total	Chart run
30 November 2005	Oricon Daily Singles Chart	1			
30 November 2005	Oricon Weekly Singles Chart	1	83,708	160,000	9 weeks
30 November 2005	Oricon Monthly Singles Chart	7			
30 November 2005	Oricon Yearly Singles Chart	73			

- Total Sales : 160,000 (Japan)
- RIAJ certification: Gold
