= Next Level (Ayumi Hamasaki song) =

Promotional single by Ayumi Hamasaki

from the album Next Level
- Language: Japanese
- Released: March 25, 2009
- Recorded: 2008
- Genre: Dance-pop
- Length: 4:30
- Label: Avex Trax
- Songwriter: Ayumi Hamasaki
- Producer: Dai Nagao

"Next Level" is a song recorded by Japanese recording artist and songwriter Ayumi Hamasaki taken from her tenth studio album Next Level (2009). The song was written by Hamasaki herself while the composition was by Dai Nagao and arrangement by HΛL. The song was conceived while Hamasaki was working on the studio album during her anniversary year, which was in April 2008. This year was to commemorate her ten-year anniversary since her debut single "Poker Face". "Next Level" was released as the album's lead and only promotional single on the same date as the album release digitally.

Musically, "Next Level" is a dance-oriented song that utilizes several electronic dance music genres, which was very similar to the rest of the Next Level album. The musical composition, noted for its ethereal influences and softer synthesizers, guitar and keyboard instrumentation, was compared to the "light techno" influences throughout her fifth studio album Rainbow (2002). Lyrically, the song talks about Hamasaki leaving her past, embracing the present and getting ready for the future, referring to it as "Next Level".

"Next Level" received favorable reviews from most contemporary music critics, who praised the production. Many critics had praised Hamasaki's vocal delivery, the song's quality and the songwriting was particularly highlighted. However, some critics were critical towards the lack of innovation. Because "Next Level" was released as a digital download single only, the song was deemed ineligible to chart on the Oricon chart under their specific guidelines. However, the song charted on other Japanese charts. It became her first single to chart on the Japan Hot 100 at eighty-nine.

An accompanying music video was shot by Stanly Izumi Kim and Luis Hernandez; Hernandez had previously directed her singles "Bold & Delicious" and "Pride" and was her first to be shot by a duo. The video shows Hamasaki driving on a beach front and inside a city. Hamasaki has performed the song only once, being on her Ayumi Hamasaki Arena Tour 2009 A: Next Level.

== Background ==
In April 2008, Hamasaki had announced her commemoration of her tenth year inside the music business since her debut single "Poker Face". In order to do this, Hamasaki had several plans in order to celebrate the anniversary. She released her anniversary single "Mirrorcle World" on April 8, exactly ten years after the release off her debut single. The song received favorable reception from the Japanese audience and critics and topped the Oricon Singles Chart, which eventually gave her the distinction in being the only female solo artist in Japanese history to have a number single in ten consecutive years. The song was certified Platinum by the Recording Industry Association of Japan (RIAJ) for shipments of 250,000 units throughout Japan. Hamasaki and her label Avex Trax had announced the new nationwide tour Ayumi Hamasaki Asia Tour 2008: 10th Anniversary to commemorate her touring since her debut.

She toured throughout Asian countries including Hong Kong, China, Japan, Korea and Taiwan. Then, in order to complete her tenth anniversary year, she released her third greatest hits compilation A Complete: All Singles in September 2008, which featured all her lead solo singles since the release off her debut single. It achieved favorable reviews from the Japanese public and critics and was certified triple platinum fr shipments off 750,000 units within Japan.

In December 2008, Hamasaki commenced the news off a new studio album and in order to pre-promote it, she released the double A-side single "Days/Green". The song was a commercial success and was certified gold by RIAJ. She then released the single double A-side singles "Rule/Sparkle" as the second and final singles from the studio album. Commercially, the songs were a commercial success in her native Japan and was also certified gold in Japan for shipments off 100,000 units. Both songs became her thirty-first and third-second number one on the Oricon chart respectively.

== Composition ==
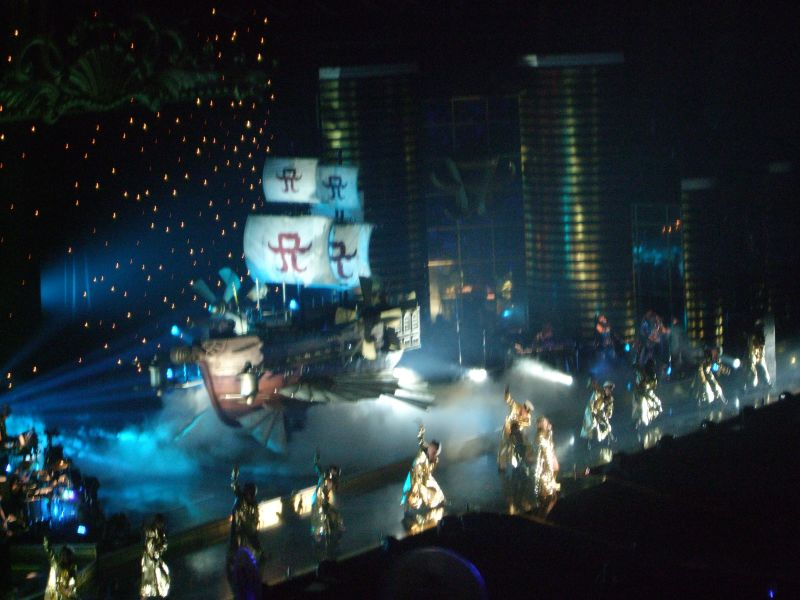
Hamasaki begun work on "Next Level" while she was touring on her Ayumi Hamasaki Arena Tour 2009 A: Next Level (pictured).

"Next Level" was written by Hamasaki herself which she has professional done herself since her debut single "Poker Face" and recorded throughout 2008 after completing her Arena tour. Hamasaki had returned with past composers and arrangers for the tracks on the album, including "Next Level". "Next Level" was then composed by her long-time collaborator Dai Nagao, who goes by the alias "D.A.I.". The collaboration with Nagao became their first song together since his last collaboration on her 2006 single "Blue Bird" which was taken from her studio album Secret. This was then his first effort since "Will" from her album (Miss)understood in 2005 . For the song, it featured guitar instrumentation by Takehito Shimizu, who along with Toshiharu Umesaki had programmed the song. The song featured additional background vocals from Junko Hirtani and the song was mixed by long-time collaborator Koji Morimoto, who mixed previous songs for Hamasaki and directed her 2002 music video "Connected".

Musically, "Next Level" contains the same elements off the parent album which is electronic dance music. Individually, the track is a dance-pop and electronic song. The song features instrumentation of guitars and keyboards that include the "crystalline effects that made it ethereal" and the song was reminiscence towards her previous album Rainbow (2002). Throughout the album and song, the musical structure becomes more "thicker" and contains a transaction from her pop, rock and dance tradition. According to Adam Greenberg from Allmusic, who had written the album review, he focuses on the tracks throughout the album :"Hamasaki went a bit deeper on [Next Level], combining with songwriter Yuta Nakano and club DJ CMJK (formerly of Denki Groove) for a thick, somewhat wild release of dance tracks infused with a healthy dose of technology [...]"

Lyrically, "Next Level" deals with her moving on from the person she once was, embracing the present and getting up for the future, referring to the "Next Level". According to the review from CDJournal, the reviewer exemplified the English translation lyric ("Even the past to leave scars now dear/Kako ni nokoshita kizuato sae ima wa itoshii") as an example on the past, present, future theme throughout the song. However, the same reviewer from the publication found that the lyric may also have another additional story behind the song and lyrical content.

== Reception ==
=== Critical response ===
"Next Level" received mixed to favorable reviews from most contemporary music critics. Victoria Goldenberg from Purple Sky Magazine was critical towards the parent album and song. She discussed the lack of innovation towards the album, feeling that "Next Level itself is less exciting." She continued saying "It’d help if the songs were arranged in a new or interesting way to match the futuristic title. Instead, we've got the light techno of Rainbow in ["Next Level"]" While reviewing her album Love Again, Random J from Asian Junkie discussed Love Again and the albums Next Level, Rock 'n' Roll Circus and Party Queen for their lack of conceptual direction, stating "[Ayu] has always struggled to create conceptual albums. She never sets out to, but then goes and names her albums in such a way that she forces an overarching theme on them which doesn't always work." He exemplified "Next Level" and the additional album tracks with the same name "which encapsulated the album theme and then a couple of related interludes to try and shoehorn in themed tracks."

Conversely, Greenberg was particularly positive and had highlighted the song as an album standout. Greenberg discussed the sequence of the albums flow and said about the song's introduction inclusion;

"The album opens innocently enough, introducing bits of electronics as accentuation around the strong focus of her vocals. As it progresses, the beats and rhythm tracks begin to take over, placing Hamasaki herself into a much deeper, thicker set of sounds custom-built to emphasize her stronger points and combine for an outstanding dance set.

=== Commercial response ===
Because "Next Level" was released as a digital download single only, the song was deemed ineligible to chart on the Oricon chart under their specific guidelines. However, the song charted on other various Asian charts. "Next Level" had debuted at number eighty-nine on the Japan Billboard Japan Hot 100 and had eventually peaked at the same position for a sole week. The song became Hamasaki's first charting single on the Hot 100 singles chart and became her highest charting single on that chart until it was surpassed by her 2010 promotional single "Microphone". It remained her lowest charting single on the Billboard Hot 100 until it was surpassed by her 2011 duo single "Why.." which peaked at number ninety-five for only one week. "Next Level" had debuted at number sixteen on the RIAJ Monthly Ringtones Chart, which became her fourth single to chart on that specific chart. The song was also her last charting single on that chart.

The song had also charted on the Japanese RIAJ Digital Track Chart at number twenty-three, which became her first single to have charted on that specific chart. The song had lasted one week on the chart and became her lowest charting single until it was surpassed by her single "Last Angel", which peaked at number thirty-five. The song was certified gold by the Recording Industry Association of Japan (RIAJ) for 100,000 paid legal downloads.

== Promotion and other usage ==
The accompanying music video was shot by Stanly Izumi Kim and Luis Hernandez; Hernandez had previously directed her singles "Bold & Delicious" and "Pride". This became her first music video to have been shot by a duo. The music video featured Hamasaki driving on a beach coast, through a city and through the beach/country side. She uploaded a teaser off the music video on her official YouTube account.

For promotional activity, the song was used in a commercial endorsement. "Next Level" was used in the Panasonic "LUMIX FX40" commercial, which featured Hamasaki in the video. The song was included in her fourth greatest hits compilation album A Summer Best (2010). "Next Level" has been performed on only one of Hamasaki's domestic and nationwide tours. She debuted the song on her Ayumi Hamasaki Arena Tour 2009 A: Next Level, which was the tour to support the parent album.

== Track listing ==
- Digital download
1. "Next Level" – 4:30

== Personnel ==
Credits extracted from the Next Level liner notes.

- Ayumi Hamasaki – vocals, songwriting
- Dai Nagao – composition
- Toshiharu Umesaki – programming
- Takehito Shimizu – programming, guitar
- Junko Hirtani – background vocals
- Koji Morimoto – mixing, engineering

== Charts ==
Chart (2009)	Peak position
Japan Hot 100 (Billboard)	89
Japan Ringtone Chart (RIAJ)	16
Japan Digital Track Chart (RIAJ)	23

== Certification ==
Region	Certification	Shipments
Japan (RIAJ)	Gold	100,000
