= Ayu-mi-x 6 =

Remix album by Ayumi Hamasaki

Ayu-mi-x 6: Gold and Ayu-mi-x 6: Silver are two remix albums released by Japanese pop singer Ayumi Hamasaki on March 26, 2008. They are the sixth and seventh entries in Hamasaki's Ayu-mi-x remix album series, and the first Ayu-mi-x albums since 2003's Ayu-mi-x V. Following 2005's My Story Classical, they are the first remix albums in roughly four years.

== Gold ==
Ayu-mi-x 6 -GOLD-

Remix album by Ayumi Hamasaki
- Released: March 26, 2008
- Recorded: 2003–2008
- Genre: Electronic dance music
- Label: Avex Trax
- Producer: Max Matsuura

Ayumi Hamasaki chronology
My Story Classical (2005)	Ayu-mi-x 6 -GOLD- (2008)	Ayu-mi-x 7 (2011)

Professional ratings
Review scores
Source	Rating
AllMusic	3/5 stars

=== Track listing ===
1. Step You (The Young Punx! Remix Edit) (from (Miss)understood)
2. Moments (DJ Kentaro Full Mix) (from My Story)
3. Talkin' 2 Myself (Stonebrigde Radio Edit) (from Guilty)
4. Beautiful Fighters (Al-P MSTRKRFT Radio Edit) (from Secret)
5. Inspire (Armand Van Helden Radio Edit) (from My Story)
6. Greatful Days (Para One Remix) (from Memorial Address)
7. Startin' (Shinichi Osawa Remix) (from Secret)
8. Glitter (Soul Central Remix) (from Guilty)
9. Blue Bird (7th Gate Snow Bird Remix) (from Secret)
10. Ourselves (Coldcut Club Mix) (from Memorial Address)
11. Ladies Night (Afra & Incredible Beatbox Band Remix) (from (Miss)understood)
12. Happy Ending (Mad Professor Remix) (from My Story)

=== Charts ===
Oricon Overall Sales Chart (Japan)

Release	Chart	Peak position	Debut sales	Sales total
March 26, 2008	Oricon Daily Charts	4		
March 26, 2008	Oricon Weekly Charts	6	25,235	45,800

=== Overall Sales Chart (Asia) ===
Release	Chart	Peak position	Sales total
January 1, 2008	G-Music Charts (Taiwan)	1	TBA
January 1, 2008	HMV HK (Singapore)	5	TBA

== Silver ==
Ayu-mi-x 6: Silver

Remix album by Ayumi Hamasaki
- Released: March 26, 2008
- Recorded: 2003–2008
- Genres: Electronic dance music, drum and bass
- Label: Avex Trax
- Producer: Max Matsuura

Ayumi Hamasaki chronology
My Story Classical (2005)	Ayu-mi-x 6: Silver (2008)	Ayu-mi-x 7 (2011)

Professional ratings
Review scores
Source	Rating
AllMusic	3.5/5 stars

=== Track listing ===
1. Game (Yoji's Remix - Radio Edit) (from My Story)
2. Together When... (Co-Fusion Remix) (from Guilty)
3. No Way to Say (High Contrast Main Mix) (from Memorial Address)
4. Alterna (Freeform Five Remix Edit) (from (Miss)understood)
5. Heaven (Daishi Dance Remix with Chieko Kinbara - Radio Edit) (from (Miss)understood)
6. Fated (Makoto Remix - Edit) (from Guilty)
7. About You (Black Strobe Edit) (from My Story)
8. Decision (Force of Nature Remix Original Edit) (from Guilty)
9. Jewel (Stéphane Pompougnac Main Version Edit Remix) (from Secret)
10. Carols (Playgroup Radio Edit) (from My Story)
11. Part of Me (Carl Craig Remix - Radio Edit) (from A Best 2: Black)
12. Walking Proud (Calm's Balearic Remix Radio Edit) (from My Story)

=== Charts ===
Oricon Overall Sales Chart (Japan)

Release	Chart	Peak position	Debut sales	Sales total
March 26, 2008	Oricon Daily Charts	5		
March 26, 2008	Oricon Weekly Charts	8	24,440	42,810

=== Overall Sales Chart (Asia) ===
Release	Chart	Peak position
January 1, 2008	G-Music Charts (Taiwan)	6
January 1, 2008	HMV HK (Singapore)	7
