= Next Level (Ayumi Hamasaki album) =

- Standard CD and digital cover

Studio album by Ayumi Hamasaki
- Released: March 25, 2009
- Recorded: 2008
- Genre: Electronic
- Length: 51:45
- Language: Japanese
- Label: Avex Trax
- Producer: Max Matsuura

Ayumi Hamasaki chronology
| A Complete: All Singles (2008) | Next Level (2009) | Rock 'n' Roll Circus (2010) |

Singles from Next Level
- 1. "Days"/"Green" Released: December 17, 2008; 2. "Rule"/"Sparkle" Released: February 25, 2009

Next Level (stylized as NEXT LEVEL) is the tenth studio album by Japanese recording artist Ayumi Hamasaki. It was released through Avex Trax on March 25, 2009 in five physical formats, and for digital consumption. The album was solely produced by Avex Trax owner Max Matsuura, whereas the album's content was written by Hamasaki herself. Additionally, it marks a return for several composers that helped construct her previous records, including Dai Nagao, CMJK, Kazuhiro Hara, HΛL, amongst others. Stylistically, Next Level is a departure from her previous albums, focusing on electronic music with elements of rock and dance.

Next Level received generally favorable reviews from music critics. A majority of the reviews praised Hamasaki's new direction, and praised the production of most of the tracks. However, minor criticism was aimed towards the lyrics and the album's themes. Commercially, the album was a success in Japan, peaking at number one on the Oricon Albums Chart and Billboard Hot Albums Sales Chart. It was certified double platinum by the Recording Industry Association of Japan (RIAJ) for shipments of 500,000 units, and sold over 380,000 copies in total. The album experienced success in other Asian territories, also charting in Taiwan.

In order to promote the album, Hamasaki released two A-side singles. "Days" and "Green" premiered on December 18, 2008 to commercial success in Japan. The following year, she released "Rule" and "Sparkle", which experienced strong sales in the region as well. Two album inclusions—the title track and "Curtain Call"—both received music videos, and managed to chart on the Japan Hot 100. Furthermore, Hamasaki promoted the album's material on her 2009 Next Level tour, which included dates throughout Japan; a live DVD with the same name was distributed the following year.

== Background and production ==
"The "Next Level" is not an aim, or a destination, but is always what you are, right now."

—Ayumi Hamasaki commenting about the foundation of Next Level.

In 2008, Hamasaki commemorated her 10th career anniversary by promoting two projects: the first was her career retrospective compilation, A Complete: All Singles. Not long after, she conducted her second concert tour outside of Japan, holding shows in Hong Kong, China, and Taiwan. While she was on tour, Hamasaki begun writing songs for her upcoming studio album. After the tour was complete, she spent most of her time composing various demos in Hawaii, alongside various musicians and composers including Dai Nagao, CMJK, Kazuhiro Hara, HΛL, amongst others. This marks a return for these collaborators, having composed majority of her work on previous albums. Recording sessions for Next Level started once Hamasaki return to Japan, having been assisted by John Paterno, Satoshi Sasamoto, Yuichi Nagayama, and frequent collaborator Koji Morimoto. The content was recorded at Avex Studios, Prime Sound Studios, LAB Recordings, and Azabu Studios in Shibuya, Tokyo; Hamasaki had also stayed in London, England to record vocals with Dom Morley and Phill Brown. According to the singer, most of the songs were completed in one-to-two takes; she told an interviewer from ViVi Magazine that "I used to have a bad habit of recording my songs before totally memorizing the lyrics and melodies... But this time, a lot of tracks were successfully recorded after only two attempts!" After the album's material was complete, it was mastered by Shigeo Miyamoto. Additionally, the album was solely produced by Avex Trax owner Max Matsuura, becoming their 10th studio collaboration since her debut.

== Composition and music ==
"Next Level" (2009)
"Next Level"—one of the album's promotional singles—was noted for its club-oriented electronic instrumentation and composition, a shift from her previous music.

All the lyrics on Next Level were written by Hamasaki herself. Her intentions for the record was to write about "current issues" rather than anything from the past, which would have found to "lose sensibilities of hopes and wishes...". Moreover, a writer from the Japanese magazine ViVi believed the titling of Next Level reflected the major theme of the album, which is determination and the "stepping stones" of building a better "future". She admitted to S Cawaii magazine that these concepts had been on her mind since her debut, but never got around to creating an album inspired by the theme. Additionally, she also viewed the theme as her ability in "not stopping" as a musician. Stylistically, Next Level was noted by music critics as a departure from her previous records. Adam Greenberg from AllMusic found that it builds on the "heavier electronica bent" of Hamasaki's remix albums, as opposed to the "standard dance and pop" styles most associated with her music. However, Japanese magazine CD Journal felt the album was divided by "aggressive" and "chaotic" dance tracks, and "hard edge rock" music.

It opens with two club-driven tracks: an interlude titled "Bridge to the Sky", and the promotional titular song. "Disco-munication" is the second interlude on the album, blending "sophisticated" electric guitars with electronic music. "Energize" is another electronic track, and is one of the only numbers on the album that include English phases ("Put your hands up together, keep your heads up forever, let me sing forever,"). The fifth track "Sparkle" was noted as a club song with an electronic arrangement, similar to the follow-up song "Rollin'". Both tracks feature autotune and vocoder pro-tools, a first for Hamasaki. The album's sixth track, "Green", shows a departure from the album's earlier electronic style; it focuses more on older traditional Japanese sound, alongside instrumentation of electric guitars and drums. The album's third interlude, "Load of the Shugyo", was described as an "atmospheric" number with heavy rock instruments in its composition. Rock music is then influenced on the following tracks "Identity"—a song that discusses about self-confidence—the single "Rule", and the tune "Love 'n' Hate", which talks about the effects of lust. The album's fourth and final interlude "Pieces of Seven" was noted for its "atmospheric" sounds of an ocean, until the second half of the track diverges into a harder rock style. "Days" is the album's first pop ballad, and is described as a love song. It closes with the ballad "Curtain Call", which features a choir and piano riffs throughout its composition.

== Release ==
The USB flash drive of Next Level, which was custom-designed by Hamasaki herself.

Next Level was released through Avex Trax on March 25, 2009 in five physical formats, and for digital consumption. The first three formats—a standard compact disc, a CD and DVD bundle, and double CD and DVD edition—includes the 13-tracks on the first disc. The CD and DVD bundle features the visuals and making-of-videos of "Days", "Green", "Rule", "Sparkle", "Next Level" and "Curtain Call". The double CD edition, which also came with the DVD, came with a second disc, including 16 live tracks that were performed on her annual Premium Countdown show that happened on New Year's Eve in 2008. A special USB flash drive was custom designed by Hamasaki, featuring all the album's content alongside a PDF-file of the album's booklet, and an extra file space of 2-gigabyte. The release of the USB made Hamasaki the first Asian artist, and one of the world's first artists to publish their album on that format. Hamasaki explained about the USB release; "As the way we listen to music changes from day to day, I looked at things from the listener's perspective and decided to sell it this way." A special Playbutton set was released two years later in Japan only, featuring all 13 songs.

First-press versions came with coloured jewelcases; the standard CD was printed in green, the double album and DVD featured a pink colour, and the CD and DVD bundle were printed in a blue tone. The album's photography was taken by Kazuyoshi Shimomura, which featured Hamasaki in a bright room filled with technicolor props and objects; the singer wears a bright latex outfit. Because Hamasaki believed the album focused on lighter themes, she wanted to envision the entire album as somewhat "bright", which resulted in the shootings with Shimomura. The booklet and photo shoot were designed by Tomokazu Suzuki, and the design was based on modern technology.

== Critical reception ==
Professional ratings
Review scores
| Source | Rating |
|---|---|
| AllMusic | 2.5/5 stars |

Next Level received positive reviews from music critics. A review from Japanese magazine CD Journal complimented the album's rock tones, and said the result was more convincing than before. The review also praised Hamasaki's vocals on several songs, as well as the record's production style. Despite his questions regarding the album's themes and songwriting, Tetsuo Hiraga from Hot Express contrasted the album's "hope[ful]" appeal to her previous records, which all dealt with "loneliness". This was particularly commended by Hiraga, who felt it was a lot more "encouraging" than anything she had done before. Adam Greenberg from AllMusic called Next Level "a thick, somewhat wild release of dance tracks infused with a healthy dose of technology", further noting, "As it progresses, the beats and rhythm tracks begin to take over, placing Hamasaki herself into a much deeper, thicker set of sounds custom-built to emphasize her stronger points and combine for an outstanding dance set." He ultimately commended Hamasaki for continuing to "evolve" her music through the album's "deeper experimentalism".

Commercially, the album was a success in Asia. Next Level debuted at number one on the daily and weekly Oricon Albums Chart in Japan, opening with 240,810 copies. This became Hamasaki's ninth number one studio album, and also became the highest first-week sales for a solo female artist that year. It descended to number two on the weekly chart for a second run, shifting 50,271 units. In total, Next Level lasted four weeks in the top ten, and stay in the top 300 chart for 30 weeks. Additionally, it was ranked the 16th best-selling album of 2009 with 377,872 copies sold in Japan. Next Level entered the Billboard Top Albums Sales Chart at the top spot, her third album to do so. It slipped to number two in its second charting week, and stayed in the top ten for four weeks. It lasted 11 weeks in the top 100 chart, with a final charting position at 76. Next Level was certified double platinum by the Recording Industry Association of Japan (RIAJ) for shipments of 500,000 units. To date, Next Level has sold 379,989 copies in Japan alone., Next Level is nominated the Album of the Year in Asia Association Music Prize Awards.

== Singles ==
Next Level spawned two physical singles and two promotional recordings. "Days" and "Green" were released as the first two A-side singles off the album, distributed on December 18, 2008 in Japan. Additionally, the singles were promoted through her 10th career anniversary, which resulted in her adding a re-recording of her 1998 single "To Be" into the track list. The singles were a commercial success, debuting at the top of the Oricon Singles Chart and was certified gold by the Recording Industry Association of Japan (RIAJ) for shipments of 100,000 physical units. A single music video for both songs were released on YouTube. The second set of A-side singles were "Rule" and "Sparkle", which were both released together on February 25, 2009. Like the first singles, "Rule" and "Sparkle" were commercial successes in Japan, debuting at number one on the Oricon Singles Chart, and was certified gold by RIAJ. Music videos for the two tracks were released on YouTube, and the physical editions of the single.

Individually, each track experienced success in sales in the region. While "Green" sold over 100,000 digital copies, "Days" shifted more than 750,000 digital units in both digital and ringtone formats. Moreover, "Rule" was certified Platinum for digital sales of 250,000 copies in January 2014. Two other album tracks were released as promotional recordings: the titular song and "Curtain Call". The former track reached number 89 on the Japan Hot 100 chart, published by Billboard. Additionally, it appeared on the RIAJ Monthly Ringtones charts at number 16, and also peaked at number 23 on the RIAJ Digital Track Chart. A music video premiered on her YouTube channel, and also appeared on physical editions of the album. The song was certified Gold in November 2016 for digital sales of 100,000 copies. Lastly, "Curtain Call" reached number 89 on the Digital Track Chart, and a visual appeared on her YouTube channel.

== Promotion and live performances ==
Throughout the album's campaign, Hamasaki promoted several songs through various products and advertisements. "Days" was used as the theme song for NTT Communications in Japan, whereas "Green" promoted the Panasonic Lumix FX-37 digital camera, and Avex Group's Mu-mo services. Moreover, "Rule" was used as the official theme song to the Japanese release of the film Dragonball Evolution, and for Mu-mo. "Sparkle" was added as the commercial tune for Honda's Zest Spark line. After the album was release, the title track and "Curtain Call" were promoted alongside two products; "Next Level" was used as the commercial tie-in for Panasonic's Lumix FX-40 model camera, and the latter contributed for the commercial of Music.Jp.

Hamasaki announced her Next Level tour in May 2009. The dates were confirmed via a flyer given out with the purchases of Next Level, enclosed in the album's booklet. A total of 32 shows in different cities were scheduled in Japan, spanning from April 11 at the Saitama Super Arena, Saitama, and finishing on August 22 at the Yoyogi National Gymnasium in Tokyo. A live album and DVD were recorded at Yoyogi National Gymnasium, featuring a total of 25 songs, spanning across two discs. A bonus disc included footage of interlude movies, and break moments between each songs. Titled Ayumi Hamasaki Arena Tour 2009 A: Next Level, the formats were a success in Japan; it reached number two on the Oricon DVD chart, and was ranked at number 17 and 35 on the Oricon Music DVD chart, and overall DVD chart of the year.

=== Legal issues ===
On May 21, 2009, the Tokyo Metropolitan Police Department were investigating a publicity event held in April for the album. According to their officials, Hamasaki made unexpected appearances in Shibuya to promote the release of her new book and Next Level, but failed to obtain the necessary permits for the event. The event happened on April 7, in front of the 109 Building in Shibuya. Approximately 8,000 people gathered to see Hamasaki, resulting in temporarily blocked roads. Before her appearance at 109, she also paid unexpected visits to record stores, going from store to store by car while fans followed her on foot, which led to chaotic conditions in the streets. Because of this, buses and other modes of transport were subjected to traffic delays. Because a permit was never obtained, authorities stated they plan to send the matter to the prosecutor's office for Hamasaki and her manager to be questioned.

== Track listing ==
All lyrics are written by Ayumi Hamasaki.

CD / digital download
| No. | Title | Music | Arranger(s) | Length |
|---|---|---|---|---|
| 1. | "Bridge to the Sky" | Yuta Nakano | Nakano | 1:43 |
| 2. | "Next Level" | D.A.I | HΛL | 4:30 |
| 3. | "Disco-munication" (instrumental) | CMJK | CMJK | 1:32 |
| 4. | "Energize" | Nakano | CMJK | 4:31 |
| 5. | "Sparkle" | Kazuhiro Hara | CMJK | 4:30 |
| 6. | "Rollin'" | Nakano | CMJK | 5:04 |
| 7. | "Green" | Tetsuya Yukumi | Tasuku | 4:49 |
| 8. | "Load of the Shugyo" (instrumental) | CMJK | CMJK | 1:32 |
| 9. | "Identity" | Nakano | Nakano | 4:19 |
| 10. | "Rule" | Miki Watanabe | HΛL | 4:06 |
| 11. | "Love 'n' Hate" | Nakano | Nakano | 3:51 |
| 12. | "Pieces of Seven" (instrumental) | HΛL | HΛL | 2:31 |
| 13. | "Days" | Kunio Tago | HΛL | 5:03 |
| 14. | "Curtain Call" | Hara | Nakano | 3:44 |

Premium Countdown 2008–2009 Live CD
| No. | Title | Length |
|---|---|---|
| 1. | "Green" | 4:52 |
| 2. | "Will" | 6:29 |
| 3. | "End of the World" | 4:43 |
| 4. | "Heartplace" | 7:03 |
| 5. | "And Then" | 2:25 |
| 6. | "Naturally" | 3:31 |
| 7. | "Powder Snow" | 4:39 |
| 8. | "Hope or Pain" | 4:27 |
| 9. | "Over" | 5:10 |
| 10. | "Scar" | 7:01 |
| 11. | "Signal" | 2:25 |
| 12. | "Hana" | 1:49 |
| 13. | "Too Late" | 4:10 |
| 14. | "Everywhere Nowhere" | 3:40 |
| 15. | "Days" | 5:05 |
| 16. | "For My Dear..." | 4:41 |

DVD
| No. | Title | Length |
|---|---|---|
| 1. | "Days (Video Clip)" | 5:20 |
| 2. | "Green (Video Clip)" | 5:32 |
| 3. | "Rule (Video Clip)" | 4:27 |
| 4. | "Sparkle (Video Clip)" | 4:44 |
| 5. | "Next Level (Video Clip)" | 4:31 |
| 6. | "Curtain Call (Video Clip)" | 3:48 |
| 7. | "Days (Making Clip)" | 3:54 |
| 8. | "Green (Making Clip)" | 3:59 |
| 9. | "Rule (Making Clip)" | 3:17 |
| 10. | "Sparkle (Making Clip)" | 3:29 |
| 11. | "Next Level (Making Clip)" | 4:37 |
| 12. | "Curtain Call (Making Clip)" | 3:12 |

=== Formats ===
- Standard CD — 14 songs on one disc.
- Digital download — 14 songs made available on digital stores.
- CD and DVD — 14 songs on one disc, and a second disc including 12 visuals; six music videos, and six making-of videos.
- Double CD and DVD — 14 songs on one disc, and 16 live songs recorded from her Premium Countdown 2008–2009 concert tour. A third disc includes 12 visuals; six music videos, and six making-of videos.
- USB flash drive — 14 songs on a USB flash drive, loaded as a MP3 file. It includes 12 visuals; six music videos, and six making-of videos, alongside a PDF file of the album's booklet. The USB also includes an extra 2GB of free space.
- Playbutton — 14 songs on a Playbutton device, which requires earphones to connect to the music.

Through Japanese retail store CD Japan, a lucky draw was hosted for 202 random customers. Special winners would win different products such as pillows, travel pouch, leisure seat, pass case, large posters and tissue boxes. Winners were announced randomly and would be awarded different prizes.

== Personnel ==
Credits adapted from the liner notes of Next Level.

- Ayumi Hamasaki – lead vocals, background vocals, song writing
- Max Matsuura – producer
- CMJK – composer, arranger, mixing
- Yuta Nakano – composer, arranger
- Tetsuya Yukumi – composer
- Dai Nagao – composer
- Takehito Shimizu – guitar
- Tasuku – arranger, guitar, programming
- Kazuhiro Hara – composer
- Hana Nishimura – composer
- Hal – arranger, mixing, composer
- Hikari – arranger
- Sharlotte Gibson – background vocals
- Stephanie Alexandra – background vocals
- Miki Watanabe – composer
- Fumiko Ishimori – background vocals
- Hiroko Nohara – background vocals
- Katsura Ohtsuka – background vocals
- Silica Nakajima – background vocals
- Kiku – guitar
- Chiharu Mikizuki – bass guitar
- Tom Tamada – drums
- Josh Freese – drums (on "Identity")
- Junko Kitasaka – bass guitar
- Junko Hirotani – backing vocals
- Kenji Suzuki – guitar
- Gen Ittetsu – string arrangements
- Mayuko Maruyama – programmer
- Hidetomo Yoneda – A&R
- Takuma Noriage – art director
- Josh Gudwin – engineer
- Ryan Kennedy – engineer
- Seiji Itabashi – engineer
- Shigeo Miyamoto – mastered by
- Koji Morimoto – mixing, recorded by
- Yuichi Nagayama – mixing, recorded by
- Yuta Nakano – mixing
- Kazuyoshi Shimomura – photography
- Masayuki Kamo – assistant photography
- John Paterno – recorded by
- Satoshi Sasamoto – recorded by
- Yuichi Nagayama – recorded by
- Avex Trax – Hamasaki's record label
- Avex Entertainment Inc. – Hamasaki's distribution label
- S.M. Entertainment – Hamasaki's distribution label

== Charts ==
=== Weekly chart ===
| Chart (2009) | Peak position |
|---|---|
| Japan Albums (Oricon) | 1 |
| Taiwanese Albums (G-Music) | 2 |
| Taiwanese J-pop Albums (G-Music) | 1 |

=== Monthly charts ===
| Chart (2009) | Peak position |
|---|---|
| Japanese Albums (Oricon) | 1 |

=== Year-end charts ===
| Chart (2009) | Peak position |
|---|---|
| Japanese Albums (Oricon) | 16 |

== Certifications ==
| Region | Certification | Certified units/sales |
|---|---|---|
| Japan (RIAJ) | 2× Platinum | 379,989 |

== Release history ==
| Region | Date | Format | Label |
|---|---|---|---|
| Japan | March 25, 2009 | CD; CD and DVD; 2CD and DVD; digital download; Playbutton; USB flash drive | Avex Trax |
| United States | March 25, 2009 | Digital download | Avex Entertainment |
| Australia | March 25, 2009 | Digital download | Avex Entertainment |
| New Zealand | March 25, 2009 | Digital download | Avex Entertainment |
| Canada | March 25, 2009 | Digital download | Avex Entertainment |
| United Kingdom | March 25, 2009 | Digital download | Avex Entertainment |
| Germany | March 25, 2009 | Digital download | Avex Entertainment |
| Ireland | March 25, 2009 | Digital download | Avex Entertainment |
| France | March 25, 2009 | Digital download | Avex Entertainment |
| Spain | March 25, 2009 | Digital download | Avex Entertainment |
| Taiwan | March 27, 2009 | 2CD and DVD | Avex Taiwan |
| South Korea | March 27, 2009 | CD and DVD | SM Entertainment |
| Hong Kong | April 3, 2009 | CD and DVD; 2CD and DVD | Avex Taiwan |

== See also ==
- List of Oricon number-one albums of 2009
