= Ayumi Hamasaki Countdown Live 2007–2008 Anniversary =

Ayumi Hamasaki Countdown Live 2007-2008 Anniversary

Live album by Ayumi Hamasaki
- Released: June 18, 2008
- Genre: J-pop
- Label: Avex Trax

Ayumi Hamasaki chronology
Ayumi Hamasaki Asia Tour 2007 A: Tour of Secret (2008)	Ayumi Hamasaki Countdown Live 2007-2008 Anniversary (2008)	Ayumi Hamasaki Asia Tour 2008: 10th Anniversary (2008)

Ayumi Hamasaki Countdown Live 2007–2008 Anniversary is a concert DVD issued by the Japanese singer Ayumi Hamasaki. It was released on June 23, 2008.

== History ==
The DVD contains complete footage from Ayumi Hamasaki's Countdown Live concert welcoming the year 2008. It also celebrates the 10th Anniversary since Hamasaki's debut with the single Poker Face released in April 1998.

The DVD features every second of the concert, and includes the first ever live performances of songs such as Sotsugyou Shashin from A Ballads, and Together When..., Untitled: For Her and My All which were released on Hamasaki's 9th album, Guilty.

Also including in the DVD are special behind-the-scenes clips documenting the making of the concert.

== Track listing ==
See official website

=== Disc 1 ===
1. starting over
2. talkin' 2 myself
3. STEP you
4. Ladies Night
5. fated
6. Together When...
7. decision
8. SURREAL
9. Bold & Delicious
10. RAINBOW
11. evolution
12. Boys & Girls
13. glitter

=== Encore ===
1. Untitled ~For Her~
2. Sotsugyou Shashin
3. +
4. Humming 7/4
5. My All
6. +special video-making movie (30 min.)

== Charts ==
Oricon Sales Chart (Japan)

Release	Chart	Peak position	First week sales	Sales total
June 18, 2008	Oricon Daily Albums Chart	1		
June 18, 2008	Oricon Weekly Albums Chart	1	42,387	98,204
June 18, 2008	Oricon Monthly Albums Chart	1		
