= Guilty (Ayumi Hamasaki album) =

Studio album by Ayumi Hamasaki
- Released: January 1, 2008
- Recorded: 2007
- Studios: Prime Sound Studio Form (Tokyo); The Record Plant (Los Angeles); ZeeQ studio (Tokyo); Conway Recording Studios (Los Angeles); Clinton Recording Studios (New York City); Avex Studio Azabu (Tokyo); Hitokuchizaka Studio (Tokyo); Bunkamura Studio (Tokyo); Sound City (Tokyo)
- Genre: Rock
- Length: 55:36
- Label: Avex Trax
- Producer: Max Matsuura

Ayumi Hamasaki chronology
A Best 2 (White/Black) (2007)	Guilty (2008)	A Complete: All Singles (2008)

Alternative cover
- CD+DVD edition

Singles from Guilty
- 1. "Glitter/Fated" Released: July 18, 2007; 2. "Talkin' 2 Myself" Released: September 19, 2007; 3. "Together When..." Released: December 5, 2007

Guilty (capitalized as GUILTY) is the ninth studio album by Japanese recording artist Ayumi Hamasaki. It was released on New Year's Day 2008 by Avex Trax. Guilty marks Hamasaki's ninth consecutive album to be fully produced by Japanese producer and manager Max Matsuura, while she contributes to the album as the lead vocalist, background vocalist, and songwriter to all songs. Recorded in Japanese with minor phrases in English, Guilty is a rock album with numerous musical elements such as pop rock, heavy metal, synthrock, and power ballad melodies.

Guilty was recorded in Japan and the United States of America, making it Hamasaki's third album recorded in the US. Additional production and mastering was handled in both Japan and the US. Five different formats were released to promote the album; a standalone CD, a CD and DVD bundle, a photo book package, a limited edition Playbutton, and a digital release worldwide. Three different artworks were issued for the album's cover sleeve; the CD format has a long-shot of Hamasaki in a leopard-print dress, the CD and DVD format had a close-up of Hamasaki's face, and the photo book package has Hamasaki sitting in a director's seat with a yellow dress on.

Upon the album's release, it was met with mixed to favourable reviews from music critics. Critics complimented the album's darker elements and commended Hamasaki's authentic deliveries through her lyrics and emotions. However, some criticized the album's overpowering arrangements and Hamasaki's vocal performances, alongside the album's pigeon-holed genres and lack of music diversity. Commercially, Guilty was a success. It became Hamasaki's first studio album to miss the top spot on Japan's Oricon Albums Chart, which was occupied by Kobukuro's 5296. Despite this, Guilty sold over 568,000 units by the end of the 2008. It was certified double platinum by the Recording Industry Association of Japan (RIAJ) for shipments of 500,000 units.

Three singles were released from Guilty. Its lead and only double a-side single "Glitter/Fated"" was a commercial success, peaking at number one on the Japanese Oricon Singles Chart and was certified gold by the RIAJ. The album's second single, "Talkin' 2 Myself," was a commercial success; it peaked at number one on the Oricon Singles Chart and was certified gold by the RIAJ. The album's only digital single, "Together When..." could not chart on the Oricon Singles Chart because it was marketed digitally; it managed to sell over 3.3 million sales, Hamasaki's best selling single to date. Several other album tracks charted on competent charts in Japan. Hamasaki promoted the album on her 2008 10th Anniversary Asia Tour.

== Background and development ==
"I didn't get the same feeling this time around [of emotional content]. There's nothing emotional about this album Guilty, it was just finished in a breath. But when I examined the songs' lyrics from my album, I was astonished that they somehow are telling a story. "How could it be?" I asked."

— Hamasaki discussing the lyrical and emotional process of Guilty.

In July 2007, it was confirmed by Ayumi Hamasaki and her record label Avex Trax that she would release a then-untitled upcoming studio album that would include fifteen tracks and a bonus DVD. Hamasaki and Avex Trax enlisted long-term collaborator, Japanese businessman and producer Max Matsuura, to produce the album; this marks Hamasaki's ninth consecutive studio album to be fully produced by Matsuura. Hamasaki begun recording the album at Avex Studios and Prime Sound Studios in Japan around end-2006 with Hiroshi Sato, Koji Morimoto, Satoshi Kumasaka, Yasuo Matsumoto, Yoshinori Kumamoto, and Yuichi Nagayama. Hamasaki traveled to Los Angeles, California to record the rest of the album at Record Plant Recording Studios with Bradley Cook, Steve Churchyard, and Troy Halverson; This marks Hamasaki's third album to have been recorded in Los Angeles; her previous albums (Miss)Understood and Secret (2006) were both recorded in Los Angeles as well.

The material from Guilty was produced and recorded over a year and five months, Hamasaki's longest spanning projects since recording her studio My Story with two years. Hamasaki and Avex enlisted previous composers and arrangers for the album, such as CMJK, Tetsuya Yukumi, Yuta Nakano, and Kazuhiro Hara; these composers and arrangers started working with Hamasaki back on her 2002 album Rainbow and 2004 My Story. Several instruments from the album were directed by American musicians and arrangers; tracks such as "Talkin' 2 Myself," "Decision," "Together When...," and "Untitled (For Her)" were directed by American musicians. Hamasaki said about the album's title; "I have carefully done a lot of soul searching regarding the issue of "feeling guilty, but still life has to go on" whenever I was composing or performing. No matter how people feel sinful, since we are alive and kicking, then we should continue living on the best we could whether we are sad or happy."

A month before the album's release, Hamasaki announced that an inoperable condition, possibly tinnitus or Ménière's disease, had caused complete deafness in her left ear. She disclosed that she had been diagnosed with the condition in 2006 and that the problem dated back to 2000. Despite the setback, Hamasaki stated that she wished to continue singing, and that she would "not give up" on her fans and that "as a professional," she wanted to "deliver the best performance for everyone."

== Composition and songs ==
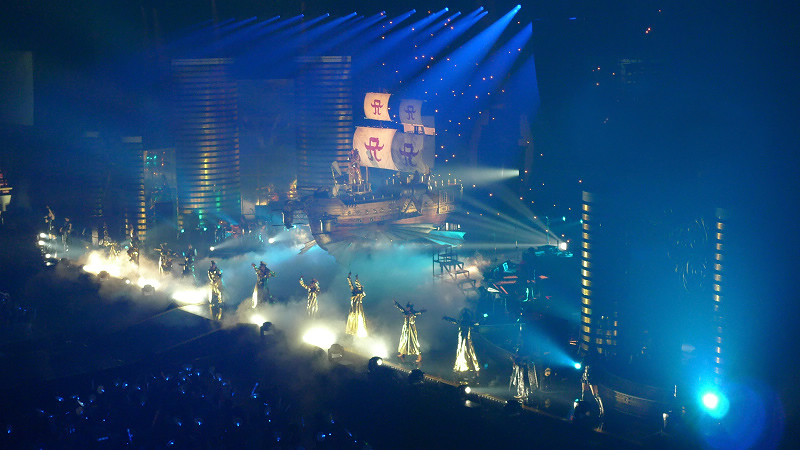
Hamasaki performing "Mirrorcle World" on her 2008 10th Anniversary Asia Tour. "Mirrorcle World" was adapted and further developed from the Guilty interlude, "Mirror."

Guilty is a rock music album with numerous musical elements such as rock, heavy metal, electronic music, and pop ballad melodies. In an interview with Japanese magazine S Cawaii, Hamasaki said about the production of the album; "I think this is a nice album [Guilty]. The word "nice" does have a lot of meaning, or it is full of thoughts. Although I tend to praise previous albums like My Story, (Miss)Understood and Secret, these albums harbour sense of accomplishments that were different to each release-ment..." Hamasaki also stated about the lyrical and emotional content; "I didn't get the same feeling this time around [of emotional content]. There's nothing emotional about this album, it was just finished in a breath. But when I examined the songs' lyrics from my album, I was astonished that they somehow are telling a story. "How could it be?" I asked."

Hamasaki revealed that after completing the album, she started to cry a lot about it; "If there's anything special about this album, then maybe it's about I cried when I first listened to Guilty. Basically I do not listen to my own songs. I always calm down whenever I finished recording, and judge my songs as a third party, or thinking about some parts of the song such as "This part of this song maybe wasn't that easy to sing." This time it isn't both of these perception, because I couldn't stop crying during the song and I would always do something else in the middle of the song..."

"If there's anything special about this album, then maybe it's about I cried when I first listened to Guilty. Basically I do not listen to my own songs. I always calm down whenever I finished recording, and judge my songs as a third party, or thinking about some parts of the song such as "This part of this song maybe wasn't that easy to sing." This time it isn't both of these perception, because I couldn't stop crying during the song and I would always do something else in the middle of the song..." I asked."

— Hamasaki discussing her reaction after completing Guilty.

According to AllMusic editor Adam Greenberg, he said of the album's music; "On Guilty, she updates her sound to fit a modern version of J-pop, infused heavily with rock and with darker, more gothic elements... She stretches across her range admirably to capture the darker, deeper tones of the rock..." A staff reviewer from CD Journal noted darker music elements of rock and gothic rock music. A staff reviewer from Channel Ai labelled it a cross over between the rock sounds of My Story and the darker elements of her 2000 studio album Duty; "Overall most tracks move towards a heavily rock and orchestral direction with a few pop tracks included." Bradley Stern from MuuMuse noted rock elements from Secret, which Stern declared "did nothing for me"; he stated that it "seems to be following the same path, except I have a feeling there's more sincerity packed into the bunch this time round."

The album includes four interludes; "Mirror," a rock song that was extended into Hamasaki's 2008 single "Mirrorcle World" for her greatest hits album A Complete: All Singles. "Marionette (Prelude)" is a "dark" interlude track that opens the album track with the same name, using sound effects from a music box and grand piano. The third interlude is "The Judgement Day," which is an EDM song with elements of techno. The final interlude is the "Rebirth," which is a "mystical" ethereal track with no lead or background vocals. Upbeat pop music and electronic dance music is noted in tracks "Glitter" and "My All." Two pop ballad melodies are present on the album; "Together When..." and "Untitled (For Her)." The former track has been noted by critics as her most "emotional" and vulnerable songs to date, while the latter track was a dedication towards a friend she lost in 2007. The remaining songs are all composed as rock songs; "(Don't) Leave Me Alone" features elements of electronic music, "Talkin' 2 Myself" features elements of heavy metal, and the title track was compared to the work of Junkie XL by Stern.

== Release and packaging ==
Guilty was released in five different formats on New Year's Day in 2008 by Avex Trax. The stand-alone CD features the fourteen tracks in a jewel case, with first press editions including an obi and a bonus poster. The CD and DVD format features the fourteen tracks, and a bonus DVD with the music videos to "Glitter," "Fated" (which is recognized as the short film Distance Love), "Decision," "Talkin' 2 Myself," "Together When...," "Marionette," and "(Don't) Leave Me Alone." The DVD also included the making videos for each music video, and the making of Hamasaki's short film. A bonus packaging of the CD and DVD format came with a cardboard sleeve. The fourth format is the digital release. Guilty is one of the first Avex Trax albums to be released on digital retail stores worldwide on March 12 that same year; her previous and future studios were then released worldwide. The final format was a limited edition Playbutton, which was only distributed in Japan.

All five cover sleeves for GUILTY were photographed by photographer and designer Hijika. The standalone CD artwork has Hamasaki in a leopard print dress, standing in a canyon with Hamasaki's name and the album title superimposed on her. This marks Hamasaki's first ever cover sleeve to be photographed and directed outside of Japan. The CD and music video DVD format has a close-up of Hamasaki's face, with Hamasaki's name and the album title superimposed on her. The Playbutton box uses the CD and DVD cover, while the Playbutton device has a gold "G" symbol over an orange background. The digital release uses the standalone CD format. The booklet and photo shoot were designed by Hirotomi Suzumoto and Shinichi Hara. The "sexy" and "cute" leopard print elements were first developed on Duty where she wears a cat-suit, and a mobile device advertisement in 2000. First pressing issues for both the standalone CD format and the CD and DVD format included a 30–page photo album of Hamasaki in Los Angeles.

== Critical reception ==
Professional ratings
Review scores
Source	Rating
AllMusic	2/5 stars
MuuMuse	B−

Guilty received polarised reviews from most music critics. A staff reviewer from CD Journal commended the album's musical consistency and praised Hamasaki's "emotional" lyrics and "powerful" vocals. The editor selected the album's singles as the main highlights.

Adam Greenberg from AllMusic stated that Hamasaki's move into rock music on Guilty results in "a fairly staged, theatrical sound," finding that Hamasaki "stretches across her range admirably" but ultimately veers into "unnecessary melodrama." He criticized her vocals on specific songs, feeling she was "flat in fairly standardized songs" and "a great singer trying hopelessly to keep up with dark rock ballads that are horribly mismatched to her temperament and her delivery style." He concluded, "Hamasaki's got plenty of good work in her catalog, Guilty is unlikely to stand with the best portions of it, even for her numerous fans." Despite praising "Together When...," the title track, and highly commending other album tracks, Bradley Stern from MuuMuse graded the album a B minus. He stated "I feel she's allowing herself to be pigeonholded into a very specific genre, rather than the eclectic selection she has offered in the past." He criticized the producers and composers for lacking a musical diversity.

Alexey Eremenko from AllMusic highlighted "Together When..." as one of Hamasaki's best songs to date. The reception of the album was noted by Greenberg and Channel Ai staff; the latter stated "Guilty was not that well received among some fans due to the fact that most of the musical styles were used before in previous albums." Despite this, Hamasaki considered that Guilty, alongside her 1999 album Loveppears, and her 2000 album Duty as her "magnum opuses."

== Commercial performances ==
Guilty debuted at number one on the Japanese Daily Oricon Albums Chart, staying there for an entire week. However, due to Oricon's annual fifty-one-week rule, the album charted in the second week of January and not the first. (Note: Hamasaki's first-week sales were the highest for that week (the first week of January). However, Oricon's year only has fifty-one "weeks"—the first two of the year are combined. Kobukuro's sales for the combined two weeks were slightly higher than Hamasaki's, giving them the number-one position.) As a result, Guilty debuted at number two on the Japanese Weekly Oricon Albums Chart, with an estimate 432,113 sold units in its first two weeks of sales. (Note: Sales provided by Oricon database and are rounded to the nearest thousand copies.) This became Hamasaki's first studio album to miss the top spot in Japan, and remained this position until her 2012 album Party Queen. It did however become Hamasaki's ninth consecutive studio album to debut atop the daily chart. It also became the fifth highest selling album by a female artist for first week sales of 2008. It stayed at number two for two consecutive weeks, shifting an extra 72,027 units by its third week in Japan. It stayed in the top 10 for three weeks, and the top 300 with 16 weeks overall.

Guilty entered the Billboard Top Albums Sales Chart at number three, her first album to chart on the Billboard charts since its establishment the same year. It slipped to number five in its second charting week, and stayed in the top ten for two weeks. It lasted eight weeks in the top 100 chart, with a final charting position at 80. Guilty was certified double platinum in February 2008 by the Recording Industry Association of Japan (RIAJ) for shipments of 500,000 units, making this her final album to do so nationwide. At the end of 2008, Guilty sold over 568,288 units in Japan; this ranked the sixth best selling album by a female artist, just behind entries from fellow Japanese singers Ayaka, Kumi Koda, Mariya Takeuchi, Hikaru Utada, and Namie Amuro; Hamasaki's compilation A Complete: All Singles was also ranked that same year, placed third behind Utada and Amuro's entries. Guilty took the top spot on the Taiwanese East Asian Albums Chart, and two on the overall Taiwanese Albums Chart. (Note: The G-Music chart was established in July 2005 and only archives the top 20 releases.) (Note: Week references for G-Music: Guilty 2008 week 1.) To date, Guilty has claimed sales over half a million units in Japan.

== Promotion ==
In the month of December in 2007, Hamasaki performed live on Japanese TV shows ten times for promotions, mainly with the song "Together When" (its main promotional track). Hamasaki was also featured on the cover of eight different Japanese magazines during the promoting of Guilty, such as Sweet, Voce, Bea's Up, Vivi, Popteen, Cawaii!, S Cawaii, and Tokyo Headline. As of late December in Shibuya, Tokyo, there have been many promotional pictures posted around Shibuya. "Glitter" was used as the theme song to Music.Jp and the Japanese Gold Kiwi advert, while "Fated" was used as the theme song to Avex Trax's Myu-Umo and the Japanese television series Ghost Story. "Talkin' 2 Myself" was used as the theme song to Panasonic Lumix FX33 advertisements and Myu-Umo, while "Decision" was used as the theme song to Music.Jp. Other album tracks were used as theme songs for different commercials; "(Don't) Leave Me Alone" and "Together When..." was used for Music.Jp and Myu-Umo advertisements.

=== Singles ===
"Glitter" and "Fated" were released as the album's lead and only a-side single on July 18, 2007. The songs received positive reviews from most music critics, who praised the composition and production of each song. Minor criticism was towards both the song's production, according to Stern. It also achieved success in her native Japan, peaking at number one on the Japanese Oricon Singles Chart and lasted for eleven weeks. The physical format was certified gold by the RIAJ for shipments of 100,000 units in Japan; "Glitter" was certified platinum and double platinum for selling over 250,000 digital downloads and 500,000 ringtone downloads, while "Fated" was certified gold by the RIAJ for selling over 100,000 legal downloads in Japan. The accompanying music videos for both singles was shot in Hong Kong for eight days; it was for Hamasaki's short film Distance Love, and features Hong Kong actor Shawn Yue as her lover; the short film depicts Hamasaki as herself, on a tour of Hong Kong, with Yue as her bodyguard, whom Hamasaki later falls in love with. In the later half of Distance Love, Yue is injured while riding his motorcycle, leaving behind a ring, which Hamasaki later finds.

"Talkin' 2 Myself" was released as the album's first solo and second overall single on September 19, 2007. The song received favourable reviews from most music critics, who praised the song's aggressive and powerful rock elements and Hamasaki's vocals. It achieved success in Japan, debuting atop the Japanese Oricon Singles Chart and lasted for nine weeks. The song was certified gold by the RIAJ for shipments and digital sales of 100,000 units, shifting 200,000 units in Japan. An accompanying music video was shot for the singles; it features Hamasaki dancing and singing the song in a destroyed cityscape and junk yard.

"Together When..." was released as the album's first digital and third and final overall single on December 5, 2007. This is Hamasaki's first digital single, and is Avex Trax's first single to be released only as a digital single. The single failed to chart on Japan's Oricon Singles Chart due to their policy of restricting digital sales and releases at the time. However, the single was certified triple platinum and platinum by the RIAJ for ringtone and cellphone sales, shifting over one million units in Japan. This is Hamasaki's second digital release after "Jewel" to be certified one million in Japan. With over 3.3 million sales worldwide, "Together When..." is Hamasaki's best selling single. (Note: "Together When..." has been recognized by Western publications as her highest selling single based on sales. Although Hamasaki's physical single A has sold over 1.6 million units and is recognized as her best selling single, "Together When..." has claimed over 3.3 million digital sales.)

=== Other charted songs ===
After the album's release, "Decision," "(Don't) Leave Me Alone," "My All," "Guilty," "Untitled (For Her)," and "Mirror" charted at: 35, 29, 36, 54, 84, and 93 on the RIAJ Monthly Ringtone Chart respectively. "Decision" and "(Don't) Leave Me Alone" received music videos each. The video to "Decision" features Hamasaki performing and singing the song in an inside arena with a back-up band. The video to "(Don't) Leave Me Alone"" features Hamasaki inside a blue maze singing the song. As the song progresses, several back up dancers come together for the song's chorus.

=== Concert tours and other releases ===
Hamasaki conducted several live performances to promote the material from Guilty. Hamasaki performed both "Glitter" and "Fated" on the annual 2007 A-nation concert tour in Japan. Her performance attracted positive reviews from many music critics; Jasy from Jame World stated "However, the performance of pop princess Hamasaki Ayumi was anticipated with the most impatience. She is featured on the DVD with three tracks! There is the loud and sexy 1 LOVE, in which Ayumi and her dancers twist and contort in cages, on chairs or at poles; for her captivating love ballad fated and the soft pop song glitter, she interacts with the crowd. Then, while showing the fireworks that fill the night sky, the credits roll." The live DVD was released, featuring the three performances. Additional merchandise was on sale worldwide for the performance.

Hamasaki promoted the album on her 2008 10th Anniversary Asia Tour. Hamasaki announced the concert in February 2008, with several concert tours in Asian territories confirmed. The concert tour was recorded in Taipei, and the DVD release was confirmed. Album tracks "Rebirth," "The Judgement Day," "Talkin' 2 Myself," "(Don't) Leave Me Alone," "Decision," "Marionette" and its interlude, and "My All" were included on the tour's set list.

The DVD reached number two on the Oricon DVD Chart, with over 52,622 in its first week. It stayed in the top ten for five weeks, and lasted 20 weeks overall. By the end of 2009, the live DVD sold over 76,235 units in Japan. To promote the material from Guilty and enhanced Hamasaki's worldwide releases, tracks were remixed and produced for Hamasaki's Ayu-Mi-x remix album series; "Talkin' 2 Myself" and "Glitter" were remixed by Swedish DJ StoneBridge and British production team Soul Central for her remix album Ayu-mi-x 6: Gold (2008). "Together When...," "Fated," and "Decision" were remixed by Co-Fusion, Japanese musician Makoto, and Force of Nature for her remix album Ayu-mi-x 6: Silver (2008). It was released worldwide as a digital album; the decision to release both Guilty and the remix albums worldwide, with remix collaborations from Western DJs The Young Punx, Coldcut, Para One and Armand Van Helden, has been interpreted as her first step into the global market. The reception for both remix albums and the Guilty content received positive reviews from most music critics. The silver edition and its content was later recognized as one of Hamasaki's best albums, according to Allmusic.

== Track listing ==
All lyrics are written by Ayumi Hamasaki.

CD
No.	Title	Music	Arranger(s)	Length
1.	"Mirror"	Yuta Nakano	Yuta Nakano	1:56
2.	"(Don't) Leave Me Alone"	Tetsuya Yukumi	HΛL	4:16
3.	"Talkin' 2 Myself"	Yuta Nakano	HΛL	4:54
4.	"Decision"	Yuta Nakano	Yuta Nakano	4:20
5.	"Guilty"	Tetsuya Yukumi	CMJK	4:33
6.	"Fated"	Shintaro Hagiwara, Akihisa Matsuura	CMJK	5:34
7.	"Together When..."	Kunio Tago	CMJK	5:13
8.	"Marionette -prelude-" (instrumental)	Yuta Nakano	Yuta Nakano	1:13
9.	"Marionette"	Kazuhiro Hara	Kazuhiro Hara	4:35
10.	"The Judgement Day" (instrumental)	CMJK	CMJK	1:40
11.	"Glitter"	Kazuhiro Hara	HΛL	4:53
12.	"My All"	Tetsuya Yukumi	HΛL	5:26
13.	"Rebirth"	Hal	HΛL	1:38
14.	"Untitled: For Her"	Kunio Tago	Shingo Kobayashi	5:33

DVD
No.	Title	Length
1.	"Distance Love (距愛 ～Distance Love～ Kyo Ai: Distance Love)"
2.	"Talkin' 2 Myself (Video Clip)"
3.	"Decision (Video Clip)"
4.	"Together When... (Video Clip)"
5.	"Marionette (Video Clip)"
6.	"(Don't) Leave Me Alone (Video Clip)"
7.	"Glitter (Making Clip)"
8.	"Fated (Making Clip)"
9.	"Talkin' 2 Myself (Making Clip)"
10.	"Decision (Making Clip)"
11.	"Together When... (Making Clip)"
12.	"Marionette (Making Clip)"
13.	"(Don't) Leave Me Alone (Making Clip)"

=== All formats ===
- Standard CD – Consists of fourteen original tracks on one disc.
- First pressing standard CD – Consists of fourteen original tracks on one disc. First press issues include bonus poster, the photo album, and an obi strip.
- CD and DVD – Consists of fourteen original tracks on one disc. Consists of six music videos, and seven behind the scenes videos.
- First pressing CD and DVD – Consists of fourteen original tracks on one disc. Consists of six music videos, and seven behind the scenes videos. First press issues include bonus poster, the photo album, and an obi strip.
- Playbutton – Published through a limited edition Play button device; consists of fourteen original tracks.

== Charts and sales ==
=== Weekly charts ===
Chart (2008)	Peak position
Japanese Albums (Oricon)	2
Japanese Top Albums (Billboard)	3
Taiwanese Albums (G-Music)	2
Taiwanese J-pop Albums (G-Music)	1

=== Monthly charts ===
Chart (2008)	Peak position
Japanese Albums (Oricon)	2

=== Year-end charts ===
Chart (2008)	Position
Japanese Albums (Oricon)	17

== Certifications ==
Region	Certification	Certified units/sales
Japan (RIAJ)	2× Platinum	568,288

== Release history ==
Region	Date	Format	Label
Japan	January 1, 2008	CD	Avex Trax
Japan	January 1, 2008	CD & DVD	Avex Trax
Japan	January 1, 2008	Playbutton device	Avex Trax
Japan	March 12, 2009	Digital album	Avex Entertainment Inc.
Australia	March 12, 2009	Digital album	Avex Entertainment Inc.
New Zealand	March 12, 2009	Digital album	Avex Entertainment Inc.
United Kingdom	March 12, 2009	Digital album	Avex Entertainment Inc.
Germany	March 12, 2009	Digital album	Avex Entertainment Inc.
Ireland	March 12, 2009	Digital album	Avex Entertainment Inc.
France	March 12, 2009	Digital album	Avex Entertainment Inc.
Spain	March 12, 2009	Digital album	Avex Entertainment Inc.
Taiwan	March 12, 2009	Digital album	Avex Entertainment Inc.
