= Ayumi Hamasaki Premium Countdown Live 2008–2009 A =

Video by Ayumi Hamasaki
- Released: May 13, 2009
- Genre: J-pop
- Label: Avex

Ayumi Hamasaki chronology
Ayumi Hamasaki Asia Tour 2008: 10th Anniversary (2008)	Ayumi Hamasaki Premium Countdown Live 2008–2009 A (2009)	Ayumi Hamasaki Arena Tour 2009 A: Next Level (2010)

Ayumi Hamasaki Premium Countdown Live 2008–2009 A is Japanese pop singer Ayumi Hamasaki's 8th Countdown concert DVD. It was released on May 13, 2009. The DVD topped the Oricon Charts that week with less than 50,000 copies sold.

== Track list ==
Disc 1

1. GREEN
2. Will
3. vogue
4. HONEY
5. ANGEL'S SONG
6. End of the World
7. Heartplace
8. Real me
9. MEDLEY – (And Then 〜 Naturally)
10. In The Corner
11. POWDER SNOW
12. HOPE or PAIN
13. Over
14. SCAR

Disc 2

1. MEDLEY – (SIGNAL 〜 Hana 〜 too late)
2. UNITE!
3. MEDLEY – (SURREAL, evolution, SURREAL)
4. Who...
5. Trauma
6. independent
7. everywhere nowhere
8. Mirrorcle World
9. Days
10. For My Dear...
11. +
12. flower garden
13. Boys & Girls
14. MY ALL
