= Together When... =

Single by Ayumi Hamasaki

from the album Guilty
- Released: December 5, 2007
- Recorded: 2007
- Length: 5:13
- Label: Avex Trax; Rhythm Republic
- Songwriter(s): Ayumi Hamasaki
- Producer(s): Max Matsuura

Ayumi Hamasaki singles chronology
"Talkin' 2 Myself" (2007)	"Together When..." (2007)	"Mirrorcle World" (2008)

Music video
- "Together When..." on YouTube

"Together When..." is a song recorded by Japanese recording artist Ayumi Hamasaki. It was released by Avex Trax on December 5, 2007, and Rhythm Republic on April 9, 2008 as a double A-side with one of Hamasaki's tracks "Game" as the third and final single from her ninth studio album, Guilty (2008). It was released as Hamasaki's first digital single in Japan, and was Avex Trax's first single to be distributed as a digital download only. The track was written by Hamasaki herself, while production was handled by long-time collaborator Max Matsuura. Musically, "Together When..." is a power ballad. The lyrical content is about the finishing and separation of a relationship between lovers.

Upon its release, "Together When..." received positive reviews from most music critics. Some of them selected the track as the best song from the album, while complimenting the composition and Hamasaki's vocals/songwriting. Although it did not enter in Japan's Oricon Singles Chart, it did peak at number one on the Reco-kyō Singles Chart. It was certified in two categories by the Recording Industry Association of Japan (RIAJ); as of June 2016, it has been downloaded over three million times, making this Hamasaki's highest selling single. An accompanying music video was directed by Takahide Ishii, which displays Hamasaki waiting at a taxi stand, and another scene with her as a marionette. To promote the single, it was included on some of Hamasaki's concert tours including her 2007 and 2010 New Years countdown shows.

== Background and release ==
"Together When..." was written by Hamasaki herself, while production was handled by long-time collaborator Max Matsuura. The song's instrumentation consists of piano and guitar by musician CMJK, drums by Makoto Izumitani, bass by Chris Chaney, conducting by David Campbell, and string arrangements by the David Campbell Strings Ensemble. It was then composed together and arranged by Kunio Tago and CMJK. "Together When..." was one of the only tracks on Hamasaki's ninth studio album, Guilty (2008), that included instrumentation by Caucasian composers, instead of musicians in Japan. Musically, "Together When..." is a power ballad. Bradley Stern from MuuMuse compared the composition and musical elements to the material from Hamasaki's 2002 album I Am..., and her 2003 EP Memorial Address. According to a staff reviewer at Japanese music magazine CD Journal, the song includes "quiet piano" riffs and "elegant string" arrangements. The lyrical content is about the finishing and separation of a relationship between lovers.

It was released by Avex Trax on December 5, 2007 as the third and final single from Guilty. It was released as Hamasaki's first digital single in Japan, and was Avex Trax's first single to be distributed only on a digital download format. The digital single included the recording and its instrumental version. Then on April 9, 2008, "Together When..." was re-released by Rhythm Republic as a double A-side single, issued on a 12" inch vinyl, with one of Hamasaki's previous songs "Game" (which appeared on her sixth studio album My Story (2004)). The vinyl included two remixes of "Game" by Japanese DJ Yoji, whilst the second side featured two remixes of "Together When..." by Co-Fusion.

== Reception ==
Upon its release, "Together When..." received positive reviews from most music critics. Bradley Stern, head writer from MuuMuse, awarded the song a maximum of ten points and labelled it one of the best tracks on Guilty. He commented, "Finally, a ballad with feeling!... Call me sadistic, but the best moments in an Ayumi song are the parts where it sounds like she’s about to break ("Memorial Address"). This song is full of those moments." In a similar review, a staff member at Channel-Ai awarded it five stars out of five, and believed that the song is one "of her strongest ballads". The reviewer further explained, "The emotion within the ballad is so infectious that the audience cannot help but feel empathy towards Ayumi." A staff member at CD Journal enjoyed the song, labeling it a "beautiful performance" by Hamasaki; the reviewer also complimented the instrumentation and production, and how it "melted together comfortably".

"Together When..." was unable to chart on Japan's Oricon Singles Chart because of their restriction of digital sales and position. Despite this, it did peak at number one on the Reco-kyō Singles Chart. The single was later certified in two categories by the Recording Industry Association of Japan (RIAJ); a triple platinum award certifying 750,000 ringtone downloads, and a platinum award certifying 250,000 cellphone downloads. This made it Hamasaki's first and final million selling single since "Blue Bird" in 2006, and her third and final single to sell over one million digital shipments (behind "Carols" and "Heaven"). As of June 2016, it has been downloaded over 3.3 million times, making this Hamasaki's highest selling single. (Note: The songs verification for 3.3 million downloads is referenced by AllMusic, a highly reliable source through the Western world. Despite the song being her highest selling single overall, it is not recognised through Oricon database as her highest selling single in Japan alone. Based on their ranking, Hamasaki's 1999 EP A is her highest selling single in the category (despite it being recognised as an EP), and "Seasons" is her highest selling single without any other additional recordings.)

== Music video ==
The accompanying music video was directed by Takahide Ishii. It opens with a couple arguing in a taxi, which later has them leaving the car and walk down the street. Behind them has Hamasaki sitting on a bench observing a puppet show, smiling in the distance. The taxi driver questions her smiling, and looks at the show. It then shows several camera angles with Hamasaki singing the song, and then has the second verse with Hamasaki and a male companion as the marionette dolls. As marionette dolls, they both walk past each other in a dark atmosphere, whilst the chorus has Hamasaki singing the song again at the bench. As the second chorus is about to begin, several children start to play with the dolls, to Hamasaki's delight. However, the children decide to purchase the male doll, and leaves the female doll (portrayed by Hamasaki) on the small puppet show's stage.

As the town, where Hamasaki is sitting on the bench, starts to rain, the atmosphere where Hamasaki is the doll starts to rain as well. Just after Hamasaki finishes singing the second chorus, an instrumental break happens and has Hamasaki looking at the now abandoned puppet show. A truck then drives past, which vibrates the puppet show's stage, causing the doll to fall on the ground and its strings become tangled. This happens to Hamasaki as the doll; she faints in the dark atmosphere land, with strings attached to her. Hamasaki, sitting on the bench, starts to cry and sings the remaining of the song. It ends with the taxi driver, who finishes day dreaming about the marionettes dolls, opening the door for Hamasaki to enter.

== Promotion and live performances ==
To promote the single, Hamasaki performed the song on several concert tours and was used as commercials in Japan. It was used as the commercial track for Gemcerey jewellery, which Hamasaki appeared as the spokeswoman for the company. It was then used for Music.jp in Japan. The song was included on some of Hamasaki's concert tours, including her: 2007-2008 Anniversary Tour, the 2010-2011: Do It Again Tour, and the 2012-2013: Wake Me Up Tour.

== Track listing ==
Digital download
No.	Title	Lyrics	Music	Arrangement	Length
1.	"Together When..."	Ayumi Hamasaki	Kunio Tago	CMJK	5:13
2.	"Together When..." (Instrumental)	Hamasaki	Kunio Tago	CMJK	5:13
Total length:					10:26

Game / Together When... 12" inch vinyl
No.	Title	Lyrics	Music	Length
1.	"Game" ((Yoji Vocal Mix))	Ayumi Hamasaki	Yoji	9:07
2.	"Game" (Yoji's 140Bpm Tech-dance Re-rub)	Hamasaki	Yoji	5:56
3.	"Together When..." (Co-Fusion Remix)	Ayumi Hamasaki	Co-Fusion	6:20
4.	"Together When..." ((CoFuDub))	Hamasaki	Co-Fusion

== Personnel ==
Credits adapted from the CD liner notes of Guilty;

Recording

- Recorded at Record Plant Recording Studio, Los Angeles, California; Conway Recording Studios, Los Angeles, California; Clinton Recording Studios, New York City, New York.

Credits

- Ayumi Hamasaki – vocals, songwriting, background vocals
- Max Matsuura – production
- CMJK – programming, acoustic guitar, piano, arranging
- Makoto Izumitani – drums
- Chris Chaney – bass guitar
- David Campbell – conducting, string arrangement
- The David Campbell Strings Ensemble – strings
- Kunio Tago – composing
- Co-Fusion – remixer (on vinyl format)
- Takahide Ishii – music video director

== Charts and certifications ==
=== Monthly charts ===
Chart (2008)	Peak position
Japan Reco-kyō Singles Chart (RIAJ)	1

=== Certification and sales ===
Region	Certification	Certified units/sales
Japan (RIAJ) Ringtone	3× Platinum	750,000^{*}
Japan (RIAJ) Full-length ringtone	Platinum	250,000^{*}
Summaries
Japan	—	3,300,000
^{*} Sales figures based on certification alone.

== Release history ==
Region	Date	Format	Label
Japan	December 5, 2007	Digital download	Avex Trax; Avex Entertainment Inc.
Australia	December 5, 2007	Digital download	Avex Entertainment Inc.
New Zealand	December 5, 2007	Digital download	Avex Entertainment Inc.
United Kingdom	December 5, 2007	Digital download	Avex Entertainment Inc.
Ireland	December 5, 2007	Digital download	Avex Entertainment Inc.
Germany	December 5, 2007	Digital download	Avex Entertainment Inc.
Spain	December 5, 2007	Digital download	Avex Entertainment Inc.
France	December 5, 2007	Digital download	Avex Entertainment Inc.
Italy	December 5, 2007	Digital download	Avex Entertainment Inc.
Taiwan	December 5, 2007	Digital download	Avex Entertainment Inc.
Japan	April 9, 2008	12" inch vinyl	Rhythm Republic
