= Glitter/Fated =

"Glitter" / "Fated"

Single by Ayumi Hamasaki

from the album Guilty
- B-side: "Secret"
- Released: July 18, 2007
- Recorded: May – July 2007
- Genre: J-pop, pop rock
- Label: Avex Trax
- Songwriters: Ayumi Hamasaki (lyrics); Kazuhiro Hara (music); Shintaro Hagiwara, Akihisa Matsuura (music)
- Producer: Max Matsuura

Ayumi Hamasaki singles chronology
"Blue Bird" (2006)	"Glitter" / "Fated" (2007)	"Talkin' 2 Myself" (2007)

Official Music Video
- "Glitter" on YouTube

Official Music Video
- "Fated" on YouTube

Official Short Film
- "Distance Love (Glitter / Fated)" on YouTube

"Glitter"/"Fated" is the forty-first single by Japanese pop singer Ayumi Hamasaki, released on July 18, 2007. "Glitter"/"Fated" was Hamasaki's first single of 2007 and first single in over a year, since the release of "Blue Bird" in June 2006.

== History ==
The first signs of a new single emerged when Hamasaki stated on her Team Ayu fanclub blog on April 26, 2007, that she had just finished writing a new song and was preparing to go record it. On May 17, 2007, the title was revealed on Tower Records' website. On the same date, it was announced that like last year's summer song Blue Bird, glitter would be used as a tie-up to promote Zespri's golden kiwi once again. On May 18, the single was announced officially on Hamasaki's official website. It was stated that this single would be the opening of her "third chapter." Upon availability for preorder on May 19, "Glitter"/"Fated" topped the CD sales chart on Japanese music vendor "Neowing" and its English counterpart "CDJapan" because of the amount of pre-orders that it received. On May 22, several Japanese news websites and vendors reported that "Fated" would be the theme song of the Japanese film Kaidan. It was reported that the theme song would not only be used for the film's release in Japan, but it would also accompany the film's release in over 50 countries. On May 30, 2007, Hamasaki reported on her Team Ayu fanclub blog that she would be flying to Hong Kong after her Asia tour performances in Osaka to film a new short film alongside actor Shawn Yue. The film will feature both "Glitter" and "Fated" and is actually a short movie that runs approximately 18 minutes. She would also share her first onscreen kiss in this video. On June 12, the songs "Glitter" and "Fated" were both leaked in their entirety.

== Short film Distance Love ==
Rather than having two conventional music videos, both songs are featured in one short film starring Hamasaki herself alongside Hong Kong actor Shawn Yue. Hamasaki flew to Hong Kong on June 1, 2007, to begin filming the short film which took a total of eight days of filming to complete. This was the first time Hamasaki had ever worked with a Chinese actor. Hamasaki had three translators with her at all times and Shawn Yue had two. Despite the large number of translators present, Yue stated that it was hard to get close to Hamasaki on a personal level because of the number of people constantly around them as well as the language barrier. Although this was difficult for Yue, he stated in phone interview with On.cc that he and Hamasaki are now, in fact, friends. During the filming one scene towards the ending of the film, Hamasaki wore a beautiful yet heavy wedding dress and ran around frantically for at least ten takes. Despite the 30 °C (86 °F) weather and several rain showers, Hamasaki continued filming relentlessly.

=== Plot summary ===
Distance Love depicts Hamasaki as herself, on a tour of Hong Kong, with Yue as her bodyguard, whom Hamasaki later falls in love with. In the later half of Distance Love, Yue is injured while riding his motorcycle, leaving behind a ring, which Hamasaki later finds.

== Track listings ==
CD Maxi Single

1. "Glitter"
2. "Fated"
3. "Secret"
4. "Glitter" (Instrumental)
5. "Fated" (Instrumental)

The single contains the track "Secret", the title track of her most recent studio album. This marks the first time she released a track on a single in its original form after it was featured on an album.

DVD

1. Kyo Ai ～Distance Love～ (距愛 ～Distance Love～) (Short film)

== Release history ==
Region	Date
Hong Kong	July 18, 2007
Japan	July 18, 2007
Taiwan	July 18, 2007
China	July 25, 2007
Singapore	July 25, 2007
South Korea	July 28, 2007

== Televised performances ==
Ayumi promoted Glitter/Fated by live performances on the following networks:

- July 13, 2007 – Music Station – "Glitter"
- July 13, 2007 – Music Fighter – "Fated"
- July 14, 2007 – CDTV – "Glitter"
- July 16, 2007 – Hey!Hey!Hey! – "Glitter"
- July 20, 2007 – Music Japan – "Glitter"
- July 20, 2007 – Music Station – "Fated"

== Charts ==
"Glitter"/"Fated" debuted in Oricon as #1, where it remained until the end of the week and reached #1 weekly chart with sales of approximately 110,000 copies. This is Hamasaki's 16th consecutive number one single and 28th #1 single in total. Beginning in the second week, the single fell down to #6 and eventually climbed back to #4 on the weekly chart with sales around 22,000 copies. By the end of 2007 Avex reported that "Glitter"/"Fated" had sold 244,000 copies.

=== Physical sales charts ===
Chart	Peak position
Soundscan Singles Chart	2 CD+DVD
Soundscan Singles Chart	5 CD-Only

=== Oricon sales chart (Japan) ===
Release	Chart	Peak position	First week sales	Sales total
July 18, 2007	Oricon Daily Charts	1		
July 18, 2007	Oricon Weekly Charts	1	110,165	195,000
July 18, 2007	Oricon Monthly Charts	3		
July 18, 2007	Oricon Yearly Chart	39		

- Total sales : 195,000 (Japan)
- Total sales : 244,000 (Avex)
- RIAJ certification: Gold

=== Digital sales charts ===
Chart	Peak position
Recochoku Chaku-Uta	3 / 9
Recochoku Chaku-Uta Melody	3 / 6
Recochoku Chaku-Uta All	3 / 8
Mu-mo Song Download Chart	1 / 1
Dwango Truetone Ringtones (Chaku Uta)	5
Dwango Polyphonic Ringtones (Chaku Mero)	2
