= Rule/Sparkle =

- CD and DVD version

Single by Ayumi Hamasaki

from the album Next Level
- Released: February 25, 2009
- Genre: Pop
- Label: Avex Trax; Avex Taiwan
- Songwriter(s): Ayumi Hamasaki
- Producer(s): Max Matsuura

Ayumi Hamasaki singles chronology
"Days/Green" (2008)	"Rule/Sparkle" (2009)	"Sunrise/Sunset (Love Is All)" (2009)

Official music video
- "Rule" on YouTube

Official music video
- "Sparkle" on YouTube

"Rule"/"Sparkle" is a double A-side single by Japanese recording artist Ayumi Hamasaki from her tenth studio album, Next Level (2009). The song was released on a CD and DVD format on February 25, 2009 as the second single from the album. With "Rule" composed by Miki Wantanabe and "Sparkle" composed by Kazuhiro Hara, both songs were written by Hamasaki and produced by long-time collaborator Max Matsuura. "Rule" was used as the international theme song for the 2009 film Dragonball Evolution.

"Rule/Sparkle" received mixed reviews from most limited music critics, some of whom favoured "Rule" over "Sparkle". Released in Japan and Taiwan, it peaked at number one on the Japanese Oricon Singles Chart, becoming her thirty-second number one single on the chart. The song was certified gold by Recording Industry Association of Japan (RIAJ). To promote "Rule/Sparkle", Hamasaki performed the song on several Japanese television series. It has also been included on several tours and countdown live shows conducted by Hamasaki. A music video was directed for each song.

== Background and release ==
With "Rule" composed by Miki Wantanabe and "Sparkle" composed by Kazuhiro Hara, both songs were written by Hamasaki and produced by long-time collaborator Max Matsuura. "Sparkle" is used in advertisements for the Honda Zest Spark, while "Rule" was used as the international theme song for the 2009 adventure film Dragonball Evolution. "Rule/Sparkle" was released on February 25, 2009 by Avex Trax and Avex Taiwan in three different versions: two different CD editions and a CD and DVD version. Both CD version features two remixes of "Rule" while the first version features two remixes of her single "Green" and the second features two remixes of her single "Days". Akira Toriyama, the creator and manga artist of the Dragon Ball series, was commissioned by Avex Trax to draw an illustration of Hamasaki. It shows the singer wearing the outfit of series' protagonist Son Goku and appears on the DVD version of the single. The song's music video features a piece of choreography patterned after Goku's signature "Kamehameha" attack.

Musically, "Rule" is a "hard" rock song that incorporate harder drum progression and guitar strumming; Mike LaBrie from kanzenshuu.com commented that the composition is "pound harder than they have before with her music". LaBrie also remarked that the lyrical content was rather "self-centered" and "cocky". "Sparkle" is a rock-influenced electronic song that was compared to the works of French musical duo Daft Punk.

== Reception ==
"Rule/Sparkle" received mixed reviews from most music critics. Victoria Goldenberg from Purple Sky magazine criticized the production of the singles, stating " the singles themselves barely sound like singles. I had to listen to "Sparkle" and "Rule" five times before I started to remember the choruses. That’s far from "Seasons," which stuck with me immediately when I heard it in 2000, got me into Hamasaki’s music, and remains a favorite today." Random J from his online website reviewed Hamasaki's album Party Queen (2012) and compared the composition of the album to the tracks, stating "It makes me appreciate Next level a whole lot more, an album which I cared very little for. I think it's because in my head when I hear the term Party Queen', I think of songs such as "Rule", "Sparkle" and "Rollin'" - all of which throw near enough every up-tempo song on Party queen under a Nozomi bullet train." LaBrie was critical towards "Sparkle" for its repetitive structure and its harsh composition, but was moderately positive towards the production and lyrics of "Rule".

"Rule/Sparkle" charted together and debuted at number one on the Japanese Oricon Singles Chart, becoming Hamasaki's twentieth consecutive single to debut at number-one position since her 2002 single "Free & Easy" and made her the first solo artist and the female artist to have twenty consecutive singles to debut at number-one position. The song was her thirty-second single to go to number one on the Oricon Singles Chart and charted for nine weeks, her lowest spanning single in the charts until her 2010 single "Crossroad". "Rule/Sparkle" was certified gold by the Recording Industry Association of Japan (RIAJ) for shipments of 100,000 units and "Rule" was certified platinum for digital sales of 250,000 units.

== Live performances and other appearances ==
Both "Rule" and "Sparkle" were included on Hamasaki's headline concert tours Ayumi Hamasaki Arena Tour 2009 A: Next Level, while "Rule" and "Sparkle" each were included on Hamasaki's annual New Years countdown concert tours Ayumi Hamasaki Countdown Live 2011–2012 A: Hotel Love Songs and Ayumi Hamasaki Countdown Live 2012–2013 A: Wake Up. Scottish DJ and record producer Public Domain remixed "Rule" and it was included on her remix compilations Ayu-mi-x 7 Presents Ayu Trance 4, the instrumental edition and her remix box set Ayu-mi-x 7 Limited Complete Box Set.

== Formats and track listings ==
These are the formats and track listings of major single releases of "Rule/Sparkle".

- "Type A CD single"
1. "Rule" — 4:08
2. "Sparkle" — 4:35
3. "Rule" (80kidz's "No More Rule" mix) — 4:49
4. "Rule" (Remo-con "tech dance" remix) — 6:42
5. "Rule" (Instrumental) — 4:08
6. "Sparkle" (Instrumental) — 4:30
- "Type B CD single"
1. "Rule" — 4:08
2. "Sparkle" — 4:35
3. "Days" (8-bits of tears YMCK remix) — 4:22
4. "Days" (Acoustic Orchestra version) — 5:18
5. "Rule" (80kidz's "No More Rule" mix) — 4:49
6. "Rule" (Remo-con "tech dance" remix) — 6:42
7. "Rule" (Instrumental) — 4:08
8. "Sparkle" (Instrumental) — 4:30
- "Type C CD single"
1. "Rule" — 4:08
2. "Sparkle" — 4:35
3. "Green" (CMJK Spring Storm mix) — 5:46
4. "Green" (Acoustic Orchestra version) — 4:56
5. "Rule" (80kidz's "No More Rule" mix) — 4:56
6. "Rule" (Remo-con "tech dance" remix) — 6:42
7. "Rule" (Instrumental) — 4:08
8. "Sparkle" (Instrumental) — 4:30
- "Type A CD and DVD"
1. "Rule" — 4:08
2. "Sparkle" — 4:35
3. "Rule" (80kidz's "No More Rule" mix) — 4:49
4. "Rule" (Remo-con "tech dance" remix) — 6:42
5. "Rule" (Instrumental) — 4:08
6. "Sparkle" (Instrumental) — 4:30
7. "Rule" (music video)
8. "Rule" (making of video)

== Credits and personnel ==
- Ayumi Hamasaki - songwriting, vocals
- Max Matsuura - production
- Miki Wantanabe - composer
- Kazuhiro Hara - composer
- Akira Toriyama - design
- Takahide Ishii - director ("Rule")
- Kazuyoshi Shimomura - director ("Sparkle")

Credits adapted from the DVD maxi-single liner notes.

== Charts and certifications ==
=== Charts ===
Chart ("Rule")	Peak position
Japan Weekly Chart (Oricon)	1
Japan Hot 100 (Billboard)	1
Taiwan East Asian Weekly Chart (G-Music)	10

Chart ("Sparkle")	Peak position
Japan Weekly Chart (Oricon)	1
Taiwan East Asian Weekly Chart (G-Music)	10

=== Certifications ===
Region	Certification	Certified units/sales
Japan (RIAJ)	Gold	100,000^{^}
Japan (RIAJ) Rule only.	Platinum	250,000^{*}
^{*} Sales figures based on certification alone.^{^} Shipments figures based on certification alone.
