= My Story Classical =

Remix album by Ayumi Hamasaki
- Released: March 24, 2005
- Genre: Classical
- Label: Avex Trax

Ayumi Hamasaki chronology
Rmx Works from Super Eurobeat Presents Ayu-ro Mix 3 (2003)	My Story Classical (2005)	ayu-mi-x 6 (-Silver-/-Gold-) (2008)

My Story Classical is a compilation with classical versions of songs from Ayumi Hamasaki's album My Story. My Story Classical was released on March 24, 2005. Most of the tracks were recorded with the Lamoureux Orchestra of France, which was conducted by Yutaka Sado.

== Track listing ==
1. "Wonderland"
2. "Moments"
3. "Happy Ending"
4. "Game"
5. "Hope or Pain"
6. "Kaleidoscope"
7. "Carols"
8. "Walking Proud"
9. "Catcher in the Light"
10. "Honey"
11. "Winding Road"
12. [Bonus track] "A Song Is Born" (originally from the album "I Am...")

== Chart positions ==
My Story Classical peaked at number 4 on the Oricon albums chart. This is a huge step up from her last classical album Ayu-mi-x 4 + Selection Acoustic Orchestra Version which peaked at #9, and her previous remix album series including Ayu-mi-x 5, Ayu Trance 3 and Ayu-ro mix 3 which all failed to reach the top 10.

Chart (2005)	Peak position	Ref
Japan Oricon	4	

- Total sales: 81,700 (Japan)
