= Ayumi Hamasaki Asia Tour 2008: 10th Anniversary =

2008 concert tour by Ayumi Hamasaki

- Tour by Ayumi Hamasaki
- A performance of "Mirrorcle World" from the tour
- Associated album: A Complete: All Singles
- Start date: April 5, 2008
- End date: November 2, 2008
- No. of shows: 27 in Japan; 5 in East Asia; 32 total

Ayumi Hamasaki concert chronology
- Ayumi Hamasaki Countdown Live 2007–2008 Anniversary; Ayumi Hamasaki Asia Tour 2008: 10th Anniversary; Ayumi Hamasaki Premium Countdown Live 2008–2009 A

Ayumi Hamasaki Asia Tour 2008: 10th Anniversary was a concert tour of Asia held by Ayumi Hamasaki to celebrate her tenth anniversary as a performer under Avex Trax. The tour had stops across Japan as well as in Hong Kong, Shanghai and Taipei. This was also the first time the whole performance was filmed outside Japan.

== Track listing ==
=== Disc 1 ===
1. Rebirth
2. The Judgement Day
3. Talkin' 2 Myself
4. A Song for XX (replaced with "Is This Love?" in the Japan shows)
5. Depend on You
6. Fly High
7. (Don't) Leave Me Alone
8. Decision
9. My Name's Women
10. Marionette: Prelude
11. Marionette
12. Hanabi
13. End Roll
14. Tasking
15. Surreal / Evolution / Surreal
16. Mirrorcle World

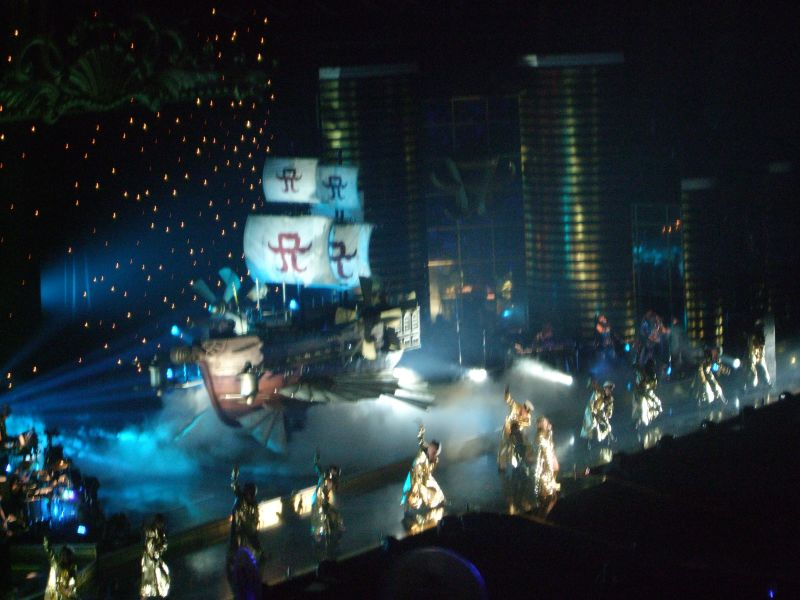
Hamasaki performing in Osaka during the tour on June 21, 2008

=== Disc 2: Encore ===
1. Dearest
2. Voyage
3. Humming 7/4 (replaced with "Independent" in the Japan, Hong Kong, and Shanghai shows)
4. Boys & Girls
5. My All
- Screen Videos
1. Rebirth
2. The Judgement Day
3. Depend on You
4. (Don't) Leave Me Alone
5. Marionette: Prelude + Marionette
6. Hanabi
7. Mirrorcle World

=== Disc 3 ===
1. Yo-chan Section & Improvised Acappela Collection (～よっちゃんコーナー＆即興アカペラ集, Yocchan Koonaa & Sokkyou Akaperashuu) (31 segments)
2. Teach me, Zin-sensei! (～教えて！ZIN先生！！, Oshiete! Zin-sensei!!) (31 segments)

== Tour dates ==
Date (2008)	City	Country	Venue	Attendance
April 5	Tokyo	Japan	Yoyogi National Gymnasium	230,000
April 6	Tokyo	Japan	Yoyogi National Gymnasium	230,000
April 8	Tokyo	Japan	Yoyogi National Gymnasium	230,000
April 12	Rifu	Japan	Hot House Super Arena	230,000
April 13	Rifu	Japan	Hot House Super Arena	230,000
April 19	Shizuoka	Japan	Ecopa Arena	230,000
April 20	Shizuoka	Japan	Ecopa Arena	230,000
April 26	Fukui	Japan	Sun Dome Fukui	230,000
April 27	Fukui	Japan	Sun Dome Fukui	230,000
May 5	Nagoya	Japan	Nippon Gaishi Hall	230,000
May 6	Nagoya	Japan	Nippon Gaishi Hall	230,000
May 10	Hiroshima	Japan	Hiroshima Green Arena	230,000
May 11	Hiroshima	Japan	Hiroshima Green Arena	230,000
May 16	Kobe	Japan	World Memorial Hall	230,000
May 17	Kobe	Japan	World Memorial Hall	230,000
May 24	Osaka	Japan	Osaka-jō Hall	230,000
May 25	Osaka	Japan	Osaka-jō Hall	230,000
May 31	Fukuoka	Japan	Marine Messe Fukuoka	230,000
June 1	Fukuoka	Japan	Marine Messe Fukuoka	230,000
June 7	Yokohama	Japan	Yokohama Arena	230,000
June 8	Yokohama	Japan	Yokohama Arena	230,000
June 17	Nagoya	Japan	Nippon Gaishi Hall	230,000
June 18	Nagoya	Japan	Nippon Gaishi Hall	230,000
June 21	Osaka	Japan	Osaka-jō Hall	230,000
June 22	Osaka	Japan	Osaka-jō Hall	230,000
June 28	Tokyo	Japan	Yoyogi National Gymnasium	230,000
June 29	Tokyo	Japan	Yoyogi National Gymnasium	230,000
September 20	Hong Kong		AsiaWorld–Arena	50,000
September 21	Hong Kong		AsiaWorld–Arena	50,000
October 18	Shanghai	China	Shanghai Grand Stage	50,000
November 1	Taipei	Taiwan	Taipei Arena	50,000
November 2	Taipei	Taiwan	Taipei Arena	50,000
Total				280,000

== Charts ==
Oricon Overall Sales Chart (Japan)

Release	Chart	Peak position	Debut sales	Sales total	Chart run
January 28, 2009	Oricon Daily Charts	2			
January 28, 2009	Oricon Weekly Charts	2	52,622	76,032	12 weeks
January 28, 2009	Oricon Yearly Charts				
