= Startin'/Born to Be... =

Single by Ayumi Hamasaki

from the album Secret
- B-side: "Teens (Acoustic Version)"
- Released: (Japan) March 8, 2006 (China) March 14, 2006 (Taiwan) March 14, 2006 (South Korea) March 21, 2006
- Recorded: 2005–2006
- Genre: Startin Pop rock, dance-rock, electro rock Born To Be Pop rock, worldbeat, afrobeat
- Length: 24:09
- Label: Avex Trax
- Songwriters: Ayumi Hamasaki (lyrics); Kazuhiro Hara (music)
- Producer: Max Matsuura

Ayumi Hamasaki singles chronology
"Bold & Delicious/Pride" (2005)	"Startin'/Born to Be..." (2006)	"Blue Bird" (2006)

Official Music Video
- "Startin'" on YouTube

Official Music Video
- "Born to Be..." on YouTube

"Startin'/Born to Be..." is the 39th single released by Ayumi Hamasaki. It was released on March 8, 2006. "Startin'" is used as the opening theme of video game Shin Onimusha: Dawn of Dreams ("Rainy Day", a song from Ayu's earlier (Miss)understood album, is the game's ending theme). The 2nd track on the single, "Born To Be..." is the official theme song of Nittele's coverage of the 2006 Winter Olympics. "Born To Be..." is a happy, inspirational pop tune. The single debuted at #1 on the Oricon Charts beating off competition from Zard and Lead. This is Hamasaki's 14th consecutive number one single and 26th #1 single in total. The release of "Startin'/Born To Be..." makes Hamasaki the female singer with the most #1 singles in Japan, surpassing Seiko Matsuda. Lastly, the third track on the single, "teens ~acoustic version~" (a TRF cover) is also included.

== Music videos ==
The PVs for Startin' and Born to Be... were both directed by Takahide Ishii. The video for Startin' has a lighter and comical tone than the other PVs of the album which have a consistently deeper tone. It starts off with two young male friends in a video store. They are conversing when suddenly, Hamasaki drills a hole through the brick wall and comes in. She dances and rejects one of them who makes an advance on her, and points a finger at the other man which shocks him. In the next scene, she is riding a motorcycle in a sports suit, and initiates a little "race" with a Hummer like vehicle with three passengers. She points a finger at them, which shocks the three passengers as well. She then stands up while driving her motorcycle and suddenly jumps off while the motorcycle crashes into a building, causing an explosion. The motorcycle scene has been criticised for being similar to the music video of Britney Spears' "Toxic", but looks similar and her look is more recognizable to the brief motorcycle scene in Kill Bill Vol. 1. Hamasaki lands safely and walks away. In the end, it goes back to the video store (in the state before Hamasaki came in) with the two friends conversing. One complains that it is hot in the building and takes off a mask, revealing it to be Hamasaki. Segments of dancing are also present throughout the PV, in between scenes. One is on a platform, while the other dancing scenes are in a dark, desert like setting, similar to "Work It", and the style of dancing is also similar to the dancing in the "Work It" video. This song was used as the opening song for the videogame "Onimusha: Dawn of Dreams" of Capcom for the PlayStation 2.

The PV for Born To Be... had thematic ties to the 2006 Winter Olympics in Turin, Italy, which TV channel Nittele promoted using "Born To Be...". Hamasaki is standing and singing in front of bright orange/yellow lights in a dark room which change brightness. In effect, sometimes the viewer cannot see much due to the brightness and sometimes they cannot see much due to the darkness. There is a band playing in the water (in the same setting), and an aerobic dancer also performs in the water. Later, people of all ethnicities around the world, mostly children, are individually projected against a white wall stating what they would like to be when they grow up. Since their voices are not heard due to the song, they have visual aids. (For example, a girl is speaking in an ice skating uniform, holding a pair of ice skates). Hamasaki also appears on this backdrop, saying something although it cannot be heard.

== Track listing ==
1. "Startin'"
2. "Born to Be..." – 4:52
3. "Teens" (Acoustic Version)
4. "Startin'" (Instrumental)
5. "Born to Be..." (Instrumental) – 4:52

== DVD track listing ==
1. "Startin'" (PV)
2. "Born to Be..." (PV)

== Live performances ==
- March 3, 2006 – Music Fighter – "Startin'"
- March 10, 2006 – Music Station – "Born To Be..."
- March 10, 2006 – Music Fighter – "Born To Be..."
- March 11, 2006 – CDTV – "Startin'"
- March 31, 2006 – Music Station – "Teens: Acoustic Version"
- April 3, 2006 – Hey! Hey! Hey! – "Teens: Acoustic Version"

== Charts ==
Oricon Sales Chart (Japan)

Release	Chart	Peak position	First week sales	Sales total	Chart run
8 March 2006	Oricon Daily Singles Chart	1			
8 March 2006	Oricon Weekly Singles Chart	1	116,034	225,000	15 weeks
8 March 2006	Oricon Monthly Singles Chart	2			
8 March 2006	Oricon Yearly Singles Chart	51			

- Total Sales: 225,000 (Japan)
- RIAJ certification: Gold
