= Days/Green =

"Days"/"Green"

Single by Ayumi Hamasaki

from the album Next Level
- B-side: "Love: Destiny"; "To Be"
- Released: December 17, 2008
- Recorded: 2008
- Genre: J-pop
- Label: Avex Trax
- Composers: Kunio Tago; Tetsuya Yukumi; Tsunku; DAI
- Lyricist: Ayumi Hamasaki
- Producer: Max Matsuura

Ayumi Hamasaki singles chronology
"Mirrorcle World" (2008)	"Days"/"Green" (2008)	"Rule/Sparkle" (2009)

Official Music Video
- "Days" on YouTube

Official Music Video
- "Green" on YouTube

"Days"/"Green" is the forty-fourth single (forty-fifth overall) by the Japanese singer Ayumi Hamasaki, released on December 17, 2008. In addition to the A-sides "Days" and "Green", the single contains re-recorded versions of Hamasaki's songs "Love: Destiny" and "To Be". The single was Hamasaki's 31st single to reach number one on the Oricon chart and 19th consecutive single to do so.

The single is certified gold for shipment of 100,000 copies.

== Release and packaging ==
"Green", one of the A-sides from the single, was released through online music store Dwango and Recochoku. It was also used in an advertisement for Panasonic. This single was released in two versions: "Days/Green" contains an updated "Love: Destiny". "Green/Days" contains an updated "To Be". Besides the B-sides, there is no difference in the two versions of the CDs other than the track order. However, the DVD of "Days/Green" contains the making of shot of the "Days" video, and the DVD of "Green/Days" contains the making of shot of the Green PV. Each version of the single was released in CD+DVD and CD-only formats, both having slightly different cover jackets. The first press of the two CD+DVD versions was packaged in a vertically long casing, similar to the first press editions of Ayumi Hamasaki's previous single "Mirrorcle World". Some online retailers included a B2 size poster of the "Days/Green" CD+DVD cover for all versions of the single.

== Commercial and promotional videos ==
The music videos for "Green" and "Days" were shot during a tour stop in Shanghai, China.

Green premiered on November 26, 2008 on MTV Japan. The music video depicts Hamasaki as a nightclub singer in 1930s Shanghai, styled after the Ang Lee film Lust, Caution. The video reportedly costs $1,600,000 and is directed by Kazuyoshi Shimomura. In the video, Ayumi rushes to a cabaret where she performs. As she is performing, a woman (Played by Saito Midori) is enticed by her presence. Later on, the woman finally dances with her.

Days was Hamasaki's first music video to be shot in anamorphic 16:9 widescreen. Retailer Peach John sold a limited-edition replica of the outfit Hamasaki wore in the "Days" music video. The music video premiered December 3, 2008. The music video is set in a ghetto and she plays a sweet girl who gets woken by her boyfriend"s motorcycle, Ayumi goes downstairs and her boyfriend gives her a helmet, she then goes out with her boyfriend and she sees a ring she wants and starts asking her boyfriend, but he rejects. She is also trying to get his attention at his Dance classes, but he ignores. It goes back to the scene where she gets woken up by the motorcycle, Ayumi goes downstairs and greets her boyfriend, but he gives a helmet to another woman who is wearing the ring she wanted. She walks away, heartbroken and her friends come to Ayumi and the video ends. Scenes of Ayumi in a basement were also shown throughout the music video.

== Track listing ==
All lyrics are written by Ayumi Hamasaki; all music is composed by Kunio Tago (Days), Tetsuya Yukumi (Green) and Tsunku (Love: Destiny).

Days/Green
No.	Title	Length
1.	"Days (Original Mix)"	5:03
2.	"Green (Original Mix)"	4:49
3.	"Love: Destiny (10th Anniversary Version)"	5:06
4.	"Days (Instrumental)"	5:03
5.	"Green (Instrumental)"	4:49
6.	"Love: Destiny (10th Anniversary Version Instrumental)"	5:06

Days/Green DVD
No.	Title	Length
1.	"Days (video clip)"	5:18
2.	"Green (video clip)"	5:29
3.	"Days (making clip)"	3:52

All lyrics are written by Ayumi Hamasaki; all music is composed by Kunio Tago (Days), Tetsuya Yukumi (Green) and DAI (To Be).

Green/Days
No.	Title	Length
1.	"Green (Original Mix)"	4:49
2.	"Days (Original Mix)"	5:03
3.	"To Be (10th Anniversary Version)"	5:22
4.	"Green (Instrumental)"	4:49
5.	"Days (Instrumental)"	5:03
6.	"To Be (10th Anniversary Version Instrumental)"	5:22

Green/Days DVD
No.	Title	Length
1.	"Green (video clip)"	5:29
2.	"Days (video clip)"	5:18
3.	"Green (making clip)"	3:59

== Live performances ==
- December 3, 2008 - FNS (Days)
- December 5, 2008 - Music Station (Days)
- December 16, 2008 - Best Artist 2008 (Days)
- December 23, 2008 - Happy Xmas Show!! (evolution and Days)

== Charts ==
=== Oricon Sales Chart ===
Release	Chart	Peak position	First week sales	Sales total	Chart run
December 17, 2008	Oricon Daily Singles Chart	1			
December 17, 2008	Oricon Weekly Singles Chart	1	127,650	225,000	14 weeks
December 17, 2008	Oricon Monthly Singles Chart	4			
December 17, 2008	Oricon Yearly Singles Chart	26			

=== Billboard Japan ===
Release	Chart	Peak position
December 17, 2008	Billboard Japan Hot 100	1
December 17, 2008	Billboard Japan Hot Singles Sales	1

=== Digital Sales Charts ===
Chart	Peak position
Recochoku Chaku-Uta	1
Recochoku Chaku-Uta Melody	1
Recochoku Chaku-Uta	1

== See also ==
- List of most expensive music videos
