= Tour of Secret =

2007 concert tour by Ayumi Hamasaki

Asia Tour 2007 A: Tour of Secret
- Tour by Ayumi Hamasaki
- Promotional poster for the Hong Kong concert
- Associated album: Secret
- Start date: March 10, 2007
- End date: June 10, 2007
- No. of shows: 13 in Japan; 2 in China; 1 in Taiwan; 16 in Total

Ayumi Hamasaki concert chronology
- Ayumi Hamasaki Best of Countdown Live 2006–2007 A; Asia Tour 2007 A: Tour of Secret; Ayumi Hamasaki Countdown Live 2007-2008 Anniversary

Asia Tour 2007 A: Tour of Secret is the first Asia-wide and ninth overall concert tour held by Japanese singer Ayumi Hamasaki, in support of her album Secret (2006). The tour started March 10, 2007, and ended in mid June of the same year, with legs not only in Japan but in other Asian countries as well, making it Hamasaki's first concert tour with non-domestic stops.

== Background ==
Although Hamasaki had performed outside Japan prior to Asia Tour 2007 A: Tour of Secret, up until then, all of her concert tours included only domestic stops. However, during Avex's 2006 a-nation '06 concert, Hamasaki announced that she was planning a concert tour that would include stops in other Asian countries; moreover, it was likely to take place within the following two years. By December of that year, Hamasaki announced in a CNN interview that it was ascertained that her first tour of Asia would take place in 2007.

== Concerts ==
=== Stop in Taipei ===
Upon Ayumi's arrival in Taiwan, hundreds gathered in Taipei's international airport to get a glimpse of her on their own soil for the first time in five years. Hamasaki's arrival caused a large media frenzy. Although she had just travelled a long international flight, Hamasaki actually seemed more than delighted to be swarmed by fans and the media alike; constantly waving to fans and smiling for the cameras, all the while being surrounded by numerous bodyguards.

Her concert itself also caused a huge stir in the media and fans. Various shops and stores throughout Taiwan decorated their stores with Ayumi-themed posters and signs. The media had a field day with Ayumi's concert; interviewing fans on the street, covering all unfolding events, and even filming the concert hall with helicopter shots. The show itself was the same as in Japan. During the encore, Hamasaki spoke primarily English with Mandarin and Japanese phrases in the conversation. She even sang a chorus of the finale "Who..." in Mandarin. It was reported that local singers such as Cyndi Wang and Jolin Tsai also attended the performance.

Ayumi had a promotional press conference in Taiwan. She stated how much she loved Taiwan, and that she felt bad that she could only perform there once during her Asia tour. Upon hearing the news of how quickly tickets sold out in Taiwan, she stated that in the next Asia tour, she would like to perform in Taiwan seven times.

=== Stop in Hong Kong ===
After her successful stop in Taiwan, Hamasaki set off for Hong Kong where she arrived on April 3. Once again she was received by Hong Kong fans and media comparably to her arrival in Taiwan. However, security measures were taken up a notch since her last stop; upon exiting the plane in Hong Kong's airport, Hamasaki's bodyguards reportedly knocked over a news reporter for touching her. Despite the extra security efforts, Ayumi appeared overjoyed to see her fans and media who had come to celebrate her arri Soon afterwards, Hamasaki allegedly spent HK$500,000 (roughly $64,000 US) in thirty minutes while shopping at boutiques and shops throughout Hong Kong. When asked by a reporter how many shoes she bought, she replied "Not too many, only 20 to 30 this day." After buying shoes, she spent three hours eating local Hong Kong delicacies and snacks at Tsim Sha Tsui. Reporters noted that she had tried a little of everything. She arrived at her hotel at 10pm.

During her second day in Hong Kong, Hamasaki spent most of the day resting at her hotel. At approximately 5pm she headed to the Hong Kong Coliseum to assess the venue. She stopped and interacted with fans on her way. Hamasaki persisted on signing autographs despite her staff urging her to leave; thus she kept signing autographs as she walked. Before the Hong Kong performance, a flyer was passed out to clarify Ayumi's 9th anniversary which had passed only 3 days prior. The flyer urged the audience to sing the first 3 lines of Hamasaki's first song, Poker Face, before the encore.

=== Stop in Shanghai ===
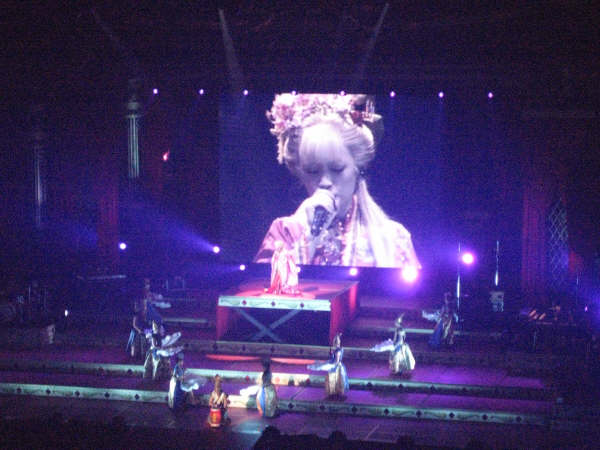
Ayumi Hamasaki performing in the Shanghai Grand Stage.

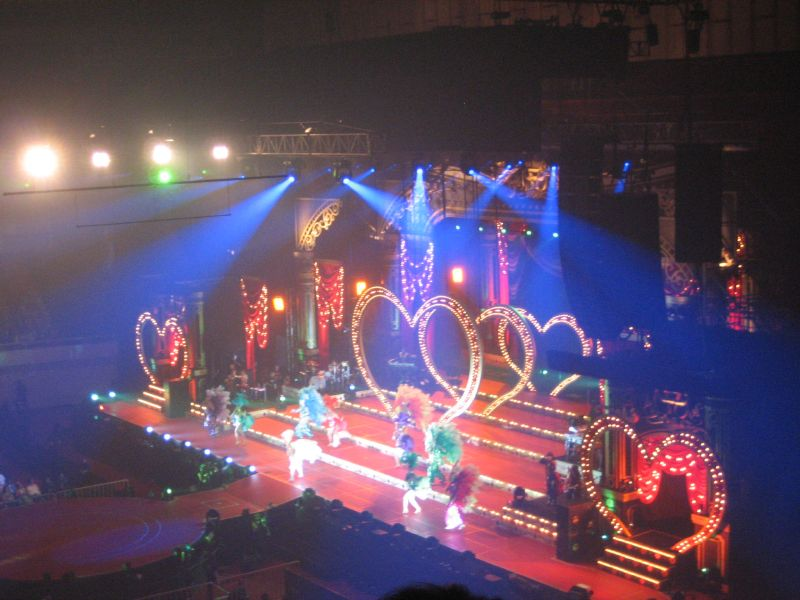
Hamasaki performing in Shanghai

Upon her arrival in Shanghai, Hamasaki launched a press conference with Avex China promoting the tour along with A Best 2, her newest album set. She wore a qipao to the event. During her encore in the Shanghai concert, she told fans that she went to the Jade Buddha Temple (Yufosi) early after her arrival in the city to pray for a successful concert and for Asian unity.

=== Singapore and Beijing ===
Hamasaki's label was unable to schedule tour dates for Singapore and Beijing. According to the Singaporean news, no label there can afford Hamasaki to perform. Avex's CEO has also said on his blog that since Beijing is reconstructing their stadium for 2008 Olympic games, no venue is available for a stop.

== Ticket sales ==
As with many of Hamasaki's tours, most of the tickets were sold out within minutes. The tickets also sold surprisingly well in Asia. 10,000 tickets were sold out to the Taiwan concert in less than two hours. Similarly, all 6,000 tickets were sold out in less than three hours in Hong Kong and 7,000 tickets were sold in Shanghai. This left numerous fans begging organizers for an additional performance dates. According to a press conference in Taiwan, Hamasaki apologized for only having one concert in there. She stated that she hopes to have a week's worth of concerts in Taiwan next time.

== Tour dates ==
List of concert dates
Date (2007)	City	Country	Venue	Attendance
March 10	Saitama	Japan	Saitama Super Arena	—
March 11	Saitama	Japan	Saitama Super Arena	—
March 24	Taipei	Taiwan	Taipei Arena	10,000
April 7	Hong Kong		Hong Kong Coliseum	6,000
April 22	Shanghai	China	Shanghai Indoor Stadium	7,000
May 9	Yokohama	Japan	Yokohama Arena	—
May 10	Yokohama	Japan	Yokohama Arena	—
May 19	Yokohama	Japan	Yokohama Arena	—
May 22	Nagoya	Japan	Nippon Gaishi Hall	—
May 23	Nagoya	Japan	Nippon Gaishi Hall	—
May 26	Yokohama	Japan	Yokohama Arena	—
May 27	Yokohama	Japan	Yokohama Arena	—
May 30	Osaka	Japan	Osaka-jō Hall	—
May 31	Osaka	Japan	Osaka-jō Hall	—
June 9	Fukuoka	Japan	Marine Messe Fukuoka	17,000
June 10	Fukuoka	Japan	Marine Messe Fukuoka	17,000
Total				180,000

== DVD release ==
Asia Tour 2007 A: Tour of Secret

Live album by Ayumi Hamasaki
- Released: March 12, 2008
- Genre: J-pop
- Label: Avex Trax

Ayumi Hamasaki chronology
Ayumi Hamasaki Best of Countdown live 2006–2007 A (2007)	Asia Tour 2007 A: Tour of Secret (2008)	Ayumi Hamasaki Countdown Live 2007-2008 Anniversary (2008)

The DVD was released on March 12 in Japan, March 21 in Taiwan, and March 25 in Hong Kong. The VCD was released on March 28 in Hong Kong. It featured 120 minutes of live footage, including encores. Both the VCD and the DVD included a tour documentary spanning the time from her first rehearsals for the tour up through the final show—condensing 150 days' worth of tour into nearly three and a half hour's worth of road movie footage.

=== Background ===
The DVD contains "exceptionally rare footage" never seen in past tour DVDs and VCDs that filmed only the final concerts. It included moments such as the wild reception of Ayumi's Asian fans, and songs performed at only a few stops during the tour ("Memorial address," "JEWEL," "momentum," and "flower garden").

Viewers who bought the DVD would be able to either watch the concert through with the documentary footage in-between or watch the concert first and then the documentaries after. Additionally, the DVD came packed in a special sleeve design as did the VCD.

=== Track listing ===
From the official website.

==== Disc 1 ====
(Documentary-1)

1. Labyrinth
2. Evolution
3. Unite!
  (Documentary-2)
4. Taskinst
5. 1 Love
6. Until That Day...
  (Documentary-3)
7. M
8. Appears
  (Documentary-4)
9. Part of Me
10. Secret
  (Documentary-5)
11. Kiss o' Kill
  (Documentary-6)
12. Not Yet
13. Surreal

==== Disc 2 ====
(Documentary-7)

1. Audience
2. Boys & Girls
  (Documentary-8)
3. Seasons
  (Documentary-9)
4. Glitter
  (Documentary-10)
5. Independent
6. Humming 7/4
  (Documentary-11)
7. Who...

=== Charts ===
Oricon Overall Sales Chart (Japan)

Release	Chart	Peak position	Debut sales	Sales total	Chart run
March 12, 2008	Oricon Daily Charts	1			
March 12, 2008	Oricon Weekly Charts	2	46,512	76,225	18 weeks
March 12, 2008	Oricon Monthly Charts	2			
March 12, 2008	Oricon Yearly Charts				

== Ayumi Hamasaki x Hello Kitty ==
A merging of Hello Kitty and the most famous female singer in Japan, Ayumi Hamasaki, has been made, and was first seen when the Tour of Secret goods became available on mu-mo on March 9, 2007. It is said they together "will make a new character". Ayumi is assumed to be depicted by her popular 'ayupan'. ("Ayu-Pan" is short for "Ayumi Panda".) In which she has large eyes that are said to make her resemble a panda. Ayumi, as the 'ayupan', is seen wearing the same clothes as Hello Kitty, overalls, with a bow on their heads. So far, we have seen a Mirror, and an ayupan of the Ayumi Hamasaki x Hello Kitty franchise. All other information on the Ayumi Hamasaki x Hello Kitty project between Sanrio and Avex is currently unknown. It is also unknown whether Ayumi Hamasaki x Hello Kitty will be released outside of Asia. This information was officially revealed on March 10, 2007, and came with a generally positive reaction from fans around the world.

Hamasaki released a statement on her official website about the new character:

I am so happy to have the opportunity to do a collaboration with the kitty that I've loved since I was a little girl. Hello Kitty has a special place in the heart of girls everywhere, no matter their age or nationality. My ASIA tour starts on March 10, and I'll be performing not just in Japan but in Taiwan, Hong Kong, and Shanghai. We've created all sorts of tour goods as well as other Hello Kitty collaboration projects for the tour, and I hope you will enjoy them.

== See also ==
- Secret (Ayumi Hamasaki album)
