= Talkin' 2 Myself =

"talkin' 2 myself"

Single by Ayumi Hamasaki

from the album Guilty
- B-side: "decision"
- Released: September 19, 2007
- Recorded: July – August 2007
- Genre: Pop rock, symphonic rock
- Label: Avex Trax
- Songwriter(s): Ayumi Hamasaki (lyrics); Yuta Nakano (music)
- Producer(s): Max Matsuura

Ayumi Hamasaki singles chronology
"Glitter / Fated" (2007)	"talkin' 2 myself" (2007)	"Together When..." (2007)

Alternative cover
- CD + DVD

Official Music Video
- "Talkin' 2 Myself" on YouTube

Official Music Video
- "Decision" on YouTube

"Talkin' 2 Myself" is J-Pop singer-songwriter Ayumi Hamasaki's 42nd single, which was released on September 19, 2007. The single contains two rock tracks, one acoustic orchestra remix of her previously released "Fated", and the instrumentals of the main tracks. It is her 29th #1 single, breaking her own record for the most #1 singles by a solo female artist. The drums in both Talkin' 2 Myself and Decision are played by Andy Selway from the band KMFDM.

== Overview ==
"Talkin' 2 Myself" is Hamasaki's second single of 2007. It debuted at #1 on the daily charts with 26,267 copies sold in its first day. A week later it also debuted at #1 on the weekly charts with over 70,325 copies sold. This is Hamasaki's 17th consecutive #1 single and 29th #1 single. "Talkin' 2 Myself" sold 39,840 fewer copies than "Glitter / Fated" during its first week of sales, although Oricon stated that more people actually considered buying this single. This is Hamasaki's lowest first week sales for an original single since the release of "Love (Destiny)" in 1999, which sold 70,540 copies during its first week. However, "talkin' 2 myself" still managed to outsell the #2 single ("Shine / Ride On" by TVXQ) by 36,634 copies. "talkin' 2 myself" stayed on the top 30 Oricon chart for four weeks.

== Music videos ==
In the PV for Talkin 2 Myself, Ayumi takes on an edgy, punk rock persona. The music video is set in a desolate urban area where it features Ayumi and her crew dancing.

The PV for Decision features Ayumi and her band dressed in black and performing onstage for a blank audience.

== Track listings ==
CD Single

1. "Talkin' 2 Myself" "Original mix"
2. "Decision" "Original mix"
3. "Fated" "Orchestra version"
4. "Talkin' 2 Myself" "Original mix -Instrumental-"
5. "Decision" "Original mix -Instrumental-"

DVD

1. "Talkin' 2 Myself" (PV)
2. "Decision" (PV)

== Release history ==
Region	Date
Japan	September 9, 2007
Hong Kong	October 2, 2007
Taiwan	October 2, 2007
China	October 10, 2007
Singapore	October 10, 2007
South Korea	October 17, 2007

== Live performances ==
- September 14, 2007 - Music Station
- September 22, 2007 - Music Fighter
- September 22, 2007 - Music Japan
- September 30, 2007 - CDTV
- October 5, 2007 - Music Station

== Charts ==
=== Oricon Sales Chart (Japan) ===
Release	Chart	Peak position	First week sales	Sales total
September 19, 2007	Oricon Daily Charts	1	26,267	
September 19, 2007	Oricon Weekly Charts	1	70,325	130,000
September 19, 2007	Oricon Monthly Charts	6		
September 19, 2007	Oricon Yearly Charts	79		

Total sales : 130,000 (Japan) Total sales : 160,630 (Avex)

- RIAJ certification: Gold

=== Digital sales charts ===
Chart	Peak position
Recochoku Chaku-Uta	1
Recochoku Chaku-Uta Melody	1
Recochoku Chaku-Uta All	1
Mu-mo Song Download Chart	1
Dwango Truetone Ringtones (Chaku Uta)	1
Dwango Polyphonic Ringtones (Chaku Mero)	1
