= Mirrorcle World =

Single by Ayumi Hamasaki

from the album A Complete: All Singles
- B-side: "Life, You, Depend on You"
- Released: April 8, 2008
- Genre: J-pop, synthpop
- Label: Avex Trax
- Songwriters: Ayumi Hamasaki (lyrics); Yuta Nakano (music); Tetsuya Yukumi (music); Yasuhiko Hoshino (music); Kazuhito Kikuchi (music)
- Producer: Max Matsuura

Ayumi Hamasaki singles chronology
| "Together When..." (2007) | "Mirrorcle World" (2008) | "Days/Green" (2008) |

Music video
- "Mirrorcle World" on YouTube

"Mirrorcle World" is the forty-third physical single and forty-fourth single overall by Japanese singer Ayumi Hamasaki. The title track is an extended version of the song "Mirror," a two-minute introductory track on Hamasaki's ninth studio album, Guilty. The single was released on April 8, 2008, exactly ten years after her debut single, "Poker Face"; the single features two new recordings of her second and fifth singles, both released in 1998, "You" and "Depend on You," respectively.

Mirrorcle World has been certified platinum by RIAJ for shipment of more than 250,000 copies in Japan, Hamasaki's first single to do so since 2006's "Blue Bird". As of 2008 Oricon Yearly Chart, it is the #33 best-selling single in Japan of 2008 and #1 best-first week sales for female artist in Japan of 2008. "Mirrorcle World" made Hamasaki the first female artist to have a single reach #1 on the Oricon for ten consecutive years.

== Packaging and design ==
The CD+DVD version of "Mirrorcle World," according to Avex, was released in a "special limited-edition package" which consists of a vertical sleeve. Also, first press editions of the CD+DVD versions comes with posters of the respective cover, and an extra-long vertical casing.

The CD-only version, however, was released in regular sleeves. Also, Spoinichi Annex revealed that the cover of "Mirrorcle World" would feature Hamasaki in a topless shot, in the vein of the covers of her album and single Loveppears and "Appears," respectively. However, whereas Hamasaki's hair covered her bust in the covers of the aforementioned records, the covers of "Mirrorcle World" depicted Hamasaki covering her breasts with her arm.

== Commercial and promotional videos ==
On January 9, rumors began circulating through Japanese media that Hamasaki was to fly to Venice to shoot a new commercial for Panasonic. The following day, the rumor was confirmed, and on February 22, Panasonic released the commercials, featuring "Mirrorcle World." In addition to shooting the Panasonic commercial in Italy, Hamasaki flew to Paris where she shot a music video for "Mirrorcle World." The promotional video was officially released on March 19, 2008.

The PV for Mirrorcle World starts off in Paris. Hamasaki (dressed in a trench coat) walks under Pont de Bir-Hakeim with Eiffel Tower in the background as she notices that men clad in black are following her. She flees from them and goes to Venice (where she is clad in a large, red, Spanish ballgown). The men find her and Hamasaki runs away from them again, leaving a handkerchief. Hamasaki goes back to Paris and she is finally cornered by the men inside a telephone booth (this time, she is clad in a white evening gown). A car arrives and the men disperse. Hamasaki steps inside the car before giving a smile to the camera. The video is also inter-cut with scenes of Hamasaki singing in lingerie and headshots of Hamasaki wearing furry nails and lash extensions.

== Track listing ==
All lyrics are written by Ayumi Hamasaki.

CD single (version 1)
| No. | Title | Music | Arrangement | Length |
|---|---|---|---|---|
| 1. | "Mirrorcle World" (Original Mix) | Yuta Nakano | Nakano | 5:14 |
| 2. | "Life" (Original Mix) | Tetsuya Yukumi | Nakano | 3:49 |
| 3. | "You" (10th Anniversary Version) | Yasuhiko Hoshino | HΛL | 4:47 |
| 4. | "Mirrorcle World" (Instrumental) | | | 5:16 |
| 5. | "Life" (Instrumental) | | | 3:49 |
| 6. | "You" (10th Anniversary Version -Instrumental-) | | | 4:43 |

CD single (version 2)
| No. | Title | Music | Arrangement | Length |
|---|---|---|---|---|
| 1. | "Mirrorcle World" (Original Mix) | | | 5:14 |
| 2. | "Life" (Original Mix) | | | 3:49 |
| 3. | "Depend on You" (10th Anniversary Version) | Kazuhito Kikuchi | CMJK | 4:41 |
| 4. | "Mirrorcle World" (Instrumental) | | | 5:16 |
| 5. | "Life" (Instrumental) | | | 3:49 |
| 6. | "Depend on You" (10th Anniversary Version -Instrumental-) | | | 4:38 |

== Live performances ==
- March 25, 2008 - CDTV x SACAS!
- December 31, 2008 - 59th Kouhaku Utagassen
- March 25, 2011 - 'Life' at Music Station

== Charts ==
=== Oricon Sales Chart (Japan) ===
| Release | Chart | Peak position | First week sales | Sales total | Chart run |
|---|---|---|---|---|---|
| April 8, 2008 | Oricon Daily Singles Chart | 1 | | | |
| April 8, 2008 | Oricon Weekly Singles Chart | 1 | 145,576 | 220,000 | 15 weeks |
| April 8, 2008 | Oricon Monthly Singles Chart | 2 | | | |
| April 8, 2008 | Oricon Yearly Singles Chart | 33 | | | |

Total Sales : 220,000 (Japan)
Total Sales : 254,000 (Avex)

=== Billboard Japan Sales Chart ===
| Release | Chart | Peak position |
|---|---|---|
| April 8, 2008 | Billboard Japan Hot 100 | 2 |
| April 8, 2008 | Billboard Japan Hot 100 Airplay | - |
| April 8, 2008 | Billboard Japan Hot Singles Sales | 2 |

=== Digital Sales Charts ===
| Chart | Peak position |
|---|---|
| Recochoku Chaku-Uta | 2 |
| Recochoku Chaku-Uta Melody | 8 |
| Recochoku Chaku-Uta All | 3 |
| Mu-mo Song Download Chart | 1 |
| Dwango Truetone Ringtones (Chaku Uta) | 2 |
| Dwango Polyphonic Ringtones (Chaku Mero) | 4 |
| USEN | 1 |
