= Secret (Ayumi Hamasaki album) =

Studio album by Ayumi Hamasaki
- Released: November 29, 2006
- Recorded: 2005–2006
- Studios: Prime Sound Studio Form; Sony Music Studios (New York City); The Record Plant (Los Angeles); Avex Honolulu Studios (Honolulu); Avex Studio Azabu (Tokyo); Warner Music Recording Studio; Victor Studio; Crescente Studio; Bunkamura Studio; Studio Sound Dali
- Genres: J-pop; pop rock
- Length: 55:29
- Language: Japanese
- Label: Avex Trax
- Producer: Max Matsuura

Ayumi Hamasaki chronology
(Miss)understood (2006)	Secret (2006)	A Best 2 (White/Black) (2007)

Alternative cover
- CD+DVD edition

Singles from Secret
- 1. "Startin'/Born to Be..." Released: March 8, 2006; 2. "Blue Bird" Released: June 21, 2006

Secret is the eighth studio album by Japanese singer-songwriter Ayumi Hamasaki, released November 29, 2006, by Avex Trax. As with all of her previous works, Hamasaki wrote all of the lyrics on Secret. The album's composition was handled largely by Dai Nagao and Tetsuya Yukumi, both of whom were frequent collaborators with Hamasaki. Generally a rock-pop influenced album, Hamasaki said that the meaning of the album was itself a secret, and that it incorporated secrets she was keeping about herself that the public did not know.

Secret had been announced originally as a seven-track EP; however, it eventually evolved into a fourteen-track album. "Startin'/Born to Be..." was released as the lead single from Secret on March 8, 2006. It debuted at the number-one position in Japan, becoming Hamasaki's twenty-sixth chart topper; with this, she became the female singer with the most number-one singles in Japan, breaking Seiko Matsuda's record. However, it would sell poorly thereafter, charting for fifteen weeks and selling under 200,000 copies. "Blue Bird" would have more success: it topped the charts in Japan and was certified Platinum for shipments of 250,000 copies. With "Blue Bird", which sold around 300,000 copies, Hamasaki became the first solo artist in Japan to sell over 20 million singles.

Secret received positive reviews from critics, who praised its rock influences and thought that every song stood well enough on its own, but felt that it "failed to leave a clear impression" as a cohesive record. The album won Album of the Year at the Japan Gold Disc Awards; its title track received "Japanese Song of the Year" at the RTHK International Awards in Hong Kong. Secret debuted at number one in Japan with first week sales of 386,280 copies. It would go on to become the 22nd best selling album of 2006 in Japan, and the 73rd best seller of 2007, selling 675,400 copies in its 15-week chart run and receiving a triple-platinum certification for having 750,000 copies shipped to stores. Despite this success, Secret would become her lowest-selling album at that point and her first not to be certified a million. According to Avex, Secret has sold 900,000 copies worldwide.

== Background ==
"At first, I thought I’d just add one more song and be done, but I ended up making ten more (laughs). I was writing new songs for the mini-album, but so many came out of me at once. Instead of choosing just a few, I wanted to include them all. So we decided—why not release a full album?"

— Hamasaki on the album's recording process.

At first, the album was announced on the official website as a mini-album, but it was later changed to a full album release. Hamasaki originally planned to release a mini-album, but during production she wrote more songs than expected. She initially intended to add “just one more song,” but ended up creating ten additional songs, leading to the decision to release a full album instead.

== Production ==
"Not yet" serves as the album’s opening track that gradually changes to a beat-heavy, heavily programmed sound. Hamasaki described it as a piece that embodies the “secrets” and “miracles” woven throughout the album. "Until that Day..." is an up-tempo rock number; originally composed by CMJK as a short instrumental, the track was expanded into a full-length song at Hamasaki’s request. She explained that writing lyrics for its fast-paced melody was unusually challenging, requiring her to experiment with new approaches to fit words to the rhythm while preserving her intended message. "Startin'" is an electronic rock song. The song was recorded in New York City and is noted for introducing a new vocal style. Hamasaki emphasized that the studio’s sound quality allowed her to explore a rock-oriented performance distinct from her earlier works, marking a turning point in her vocal experimentation. "1 Love" is a heavy rock number that pushed Hamasaki into a shouting vocal style she had not used before. Hamasaki described it as a song that balances aggressive strength with delicate sadness, reflecting the duality of human emotions. "It Was" is a medium-tempo number. Initially considered for her previous album (Miss)understood, the track was later rearranged by tasuku for Secret. Its lyrics convey uncertainty and lingering regret, exploring the human tendency to question past choices while expressing a desire to move forward despite them.

"Labyrinth" is an instrumental number with a sparkling sound. Hamasaki noted that even without vocals, the track was designed to convey a message through its melodic structure. "Jewel" is a stripped-down piano ballad. Hamasaki described it as both nostalgic and refreshing, with its simplicity enhancing its emotional impact. "Momentum" is a "heartbreaking" winter love song about unrequited love despite mutual feelings. It is the most time-consuming vocal recording of Hamasaki’s career, taking four days to complete. "Taskinst" is an instrumental track composed by tasuku, part of Hamasaki’s recurring “task” series. Beginning with a music-box motif before shifting into a heavy guitar arrangement, the track exemplifies tasuku’s distinctive style and playful approach to composition. "Born To Be..." powerful song that sings of hope that musically takes influence from African music. Hamasaki noted that its meaning deepened when placed within the album context.

"Beautiful Fighters" is a song conveying the image of a woman striving for success in her work and love life, with comical programming sounds and cheerleader footsteps. Hamasaki praised CMJK’s arrangement on this song for highlighting the contrast between cuteness and resilience in contemporary female identity. "Blue Bird" is a song with a tropical feel that sings about the healing and departure of sensitive young people. She credited her staff and collaborators for helping her endure the intense workload, emphasizing the trust and bonds that made the project possible. "Kiss o' Kill" is a warm, mid-tempo number; the track juxtaposes children’s voices with themes of adult confession and regret. Hamasaki described it as a song that contrasts innocence with the burdens of adulthood, embodying both warmth and pain. "Secret" is a mellow, medium-tempo number that closes out the album. Hamasaki insisted on recording it in a single take to preserve its tension, describing the process as a personal struggle. Completing the track left her emotional, but also reinforced her determination to continue moving forward.

== Title ==
The artwork for both editions of the albums were shot by Singaporean photographer Leslie Kee. On the CD only cover Hamasaki is wearing a sleek black gown with a jeweled back detail, and she has a tattoo on her shoulder; the text "Secret" and "ayumi hamasaki" is prominently displayed on the left side. The CD+DVD cover is a close up of Hamasaki looking over her right shoulder with a direct gaze. On both of the covers, she shows off a tattoo of a unicorn on her right shoulder (although it is not a real one, but a drawing made to look like a tattoo).

Hamasaki on an interview stated that the reason behind naming the album 'Secret' was that the album literally was a secret. She said it was named so that people might think "That's one of her secrets". She also said she wanted to feel when they hear a song, they should think they knew her secret. The album's lyrics reinforce the understanding others, rather than just yourself, as she states:

But it's not a secret in the sense that "I'm about to disclose something you didn't know!" Instead, it could be about "me" in my daily life, or it could be about you… Everyone keeps secrets; there is not one person on this planet who does not have at least one secret, nor is there a person who can tell others everything about him or herself. Even when you try to understand others (or to have a mutual understanding with others), there is always a "you" that only you know about. I have aspects that only certain people know about and aspects that everyone knows about. That's what I call a secret. And in this sense, there are secrets incorporated into this album.

== Critical reception ==
Professional ratings
Review scores
Source	Rating
AllMusic	3.5/5 stars
CD Journal	(positive)
Hot Express	(favorable)

Secret received generally positive reviews from music critics. A staff reviewer from CD Journal praised Secret for balancing energetic, danceable tracks with more reflective songs, highlighting Hamasaki’s maturity and professional polish. Alexey Eremenko from AllMusic gave Secret a moderately positive reception, rating it 3.5 out of 5 stars. The review acknowledged the album’s strengths in blending J-pop with pop-rock elements, while also noting that it wasn’t as groundbreaking as some of her earlier releases.

Tetsuo Hiraga of Hot Express gave the album a highly positive review. The reviewer emphasized that the album carried a universal resonance — about human longing, suffering, and the desire to connect — framing it as a powerful and significant work in her career. Secret won one of The best 10 albums awards at the Japan Gold Disc Awards.

== Commercial performance ==
Secret debuted at the top spot of the Oricon Albums Chart with first week sales of 386,280 copies, outselling the number two album for a large 160,129 copies. However, its first week sales are about 263,000 lower than her last studio album (Miss)understood showed. This is because the "first week sales" of (Miss)understood were actually the sales of two weeks, as Oricon blends the last week of a year with the first one of the following year, making an Oricon Year with 51 weeks only. The same rule applies for the first week sales of her I Am... album. On the Oricon chart, Secret failed to surpass the one-million mark, making it her second album to not do so (the first being (Miss)understood). However, while (Miss)understood still managed to surpass the one-million mark in accordance to Avex, Secret failed to do so, selling only 900,000 copies.

Secret slid to number two the following week, selling 108,119 copies. The album dropped to number six the following week with 50,293 copies sold. It would continue to chart in the top 20 for three more weeks. In Japan, Secret charted for 18 weeks. Secret ranked as the 22nd best-selling album of 2006 with 494,399 copies sold. It also ranked as the 73rd best-selling album of 2007 with 171,997 copies sold. The Recording Industry Association of Japan (RIAJ) certified the album triple platinum in March 2007 for 750,000 copies sold.

== Promotion ==
=== Singles and other songs ===
The album's first single "Startin' / Born to Be..." was released on March 8, 2006. The double A-side was a commercial success, reaching number one in Japan, receiving a platinum certification for shipments of over 250,000 units, and selling 188,551 copies in its chart run. "Startin'" was certified gold by the Recording Industry Association of Japan (RIAJ) for selling over 100,000 downloads. "Startin'" was used as the opening theme song for Capcom's video game Onimusha: Dawn of Dreams. "Born to Be" was a special song used as the theme song for Japan's coverage of the 2006 Winter Olympics in Turin, Italy. It was also used in a mu-mo advert.

The second and final single "Blue Bird" was released on June 21, 2006. The single "Blue Bird" debuted at number one in Japan, sold 258,566 copies, and received a platinum certification for shipments of over 250,000 units. The song received a triple platinum certification for ringtone sales of over 750,000 units, and a platinum certification for selling more than 250,000 downloads. "Blue Bird" was used in a promotional campaign for Zespri Golden Kiwis and in advertisements for Japanese music downloading services Dwango and mu-mo. The single's B-side "Beautiful Fighters" was used in a commercial advertisement promoting Panasonic's D-Snap portable audio player.

The album track "Jewel" was released as a promotional single; the song was certified triple platinum for selling 750,000 ringtones and platinum for selling 250,000 cellphone downloads. "Jewel" was used in a commercial for Panasonic's Lumix FX07 digital camera as well as a mu-mo advertisement. "1 Love" was used as in a commercial for Panasonic's D-Snap portable audio player. It was also used in another Panasonic commercial for the D-Dock. Upon the launch of the Lumix FX07 and the D-Snap and D-Dock audio players, Hamasaki appeared as Panasonic's spokesperson at a press conference in Tokyo. The album track "Momentum" was certified gold for selling 100,000 downloads.

The album's title track "Secret" was used as the theme song for Hong Kong film Confession of Pain. Hamasaki attended the movie premiere in Hong Kong. That song can also be found on the single "Glitter / Fated" and is Hamasaki's first song on its original form to be released on a single after it was featured in an album.

=== Tour ===
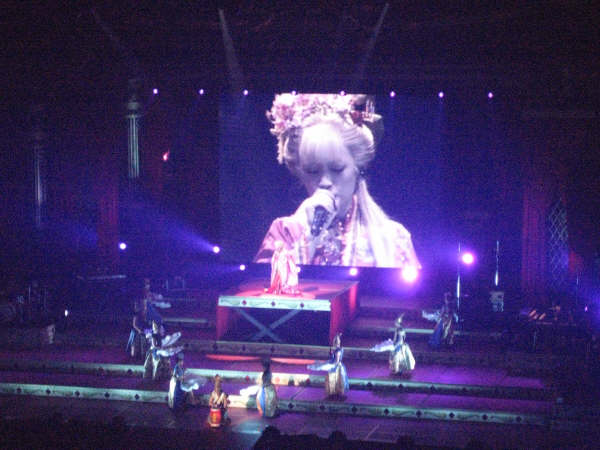
Ayumi Hamasaki performing in Shanghai during her Tour of Secret.

Upon her explosive release of Secret throughout Asia, Hamasaki launched her first ever international tour. Entitled "Asia Tour 2007 ~Tour of Secret~", the tour reached various countries and territories throughout Asia such as Japan, China, Taiwan, and Hong Kong. As with most of Hamasaki's tours, most of the tickets were sold out within minutes. The tickets also sold surprisingly well in Asia. Tickets were sold out to the Taiwan concert in less than two hours. Similarly, tickets were sold out in less than three hours in Hong Kong and in within six hours in Shanghai. To promote the album, Hamasaki performed many hit songs from "Secret". This also marked the beginning of her use of the English language at her concerts and press conferences in which she used the language to communicate fluently with fans and media.

== Track listing ==
All lyrics are written by Ayumi Hamasaki.

Secret – Standard edition
No.	Title	Music	Arrangement	Length
1.	"Not Yet"	CMJK	CMJK	2:01
2.	"Until that Day..."	CMJK	CMJK	4:48
3.	"Startin'"	Kazuhiro Hara	CMJK	4:19
4.	"1 Love"	Yoji Noi	HΛL	4:30
5.	"It Was"	Naruya Ihashi	Tasuku	4:10
6.	"Labyrinth" (instrumental)	HΛL	HΛL	1:43
7.	"Jewel"	Tetsuya Yukumi	Shingo Kobayashi	4:16
8.	"Momentum"	Tetsuya Yukumi	HΛL	4:12
9.	"Taskinst" (instrumental)	Tasuku	Tasuku	1:36
10.	"Born to Be..."	Kazuhiro Hara	Kazuhiro Hara, CMJK	4:51
11.	"Beautiful Fighters"	Kazuhito Kikuchi	CMJK	5:16
12.	"Blue Bird"	D.A.I	HΛL	4:09
13.	"Kiss o' Kill"	Tetsuya Yukumi	Keiji Tanabe	4:40
14.	"Secret"	Tetsuya Yukumi	Hikari	4:58
Total length:				55:29

Secret – DVD
No.	Title	Director	Length
1.	"Startin'" (video clip)	Takahide Ishii	5:29
2.	"Born to Be..." (video clip)	Takahide Ishii	4:51
3.	"Blue Bird" (video clip)	Takahide Ishii	4:13
4.	"Beautiful Fighters" (video clip)	Takahide Ishii	5:57
5.	"Jewel" (video clip)	Wataru Takeishi	4:20
6.	"1 Love" (video clip)	Hideaki Sunaga	5:03
7.	"Momentum" (video clip)	Takahide Ishii	4:41
8.	"Startin'" (making clip)	Takahide Ishii	4:58
9.	"Born to Be..." (making clip)	Takahide Ishii
10.	"Blue Bird" (making clip)	Takahide Ishii
11.	"Beautiful Fighters" (making clip)	Takahide Ishii
12.	"Jewel" (making clip)	Wataru Takeishi	4:46
13.	"1 Love" (making clip)	Hideaki Sunaga	4:30
14.	"Momentum" (making clip)	Takahide Ishii

== Charts ==
=== Weekly charts ===
Chart (2006)	Peak position
Japanese Albums (Oricon)	1
Taiwanese Albums (G-Music)	4
Taiwanese East Asian Albums (G-Music)	1

=== Monthly charts ===
Chart (2006)	Peak position
Japanese Albums (Oricon)	1

=== Year-end charts ===
Chart (2006)	Position
Japanese Albums (Oricon)	22

Chart (2007)	Position
Japanese Albums (Oricon)	73

== Sales and certifications ==
Region	Certification	Certified units/sales
Japan (RIAJ)	3× Platinum	666,396

== Release history ==
Region	Date	Format	Catalogue number
Japan	November 29, 2006; November 29, 2021	CD	AVCD-23179
Japan	November 29, 2006; November 29, 2021	CD+DVD	AVCD-23178/B
Hong Kong	2006	CD+DVD	AVTCD-95933

== See also ==
- Tour of Secret
- Glitter / Fated (which contains title track "Secret", the B-side of the single)
- Kiss or Kill, the movie which the track "Kiss o' Kill" was named after.
