= Ayumi Hamasaki Arena Tour 2009 A: Next Level =

Video by Ayumi Hamasaki
- Released: April 14, 2010
- Genre: J-pop
- Label: Avex

Ayumi Hamasaki chronology
Ayumi Hamasaki Premium Countdown Live 2008–2009 A	Ayumi Hamasaki Arena Tour 2009 A: Next Level	Ayumi Hamasaki Countdown Live 2009–2010 A: Future Classics

Ayumi Hamasaki Arena Tour 2009 A: Next Level is the twelfth concert tour DVD by the Japanese pop singer Ayumi Hamasaki. It was released on April 14, 2010, the same day as the release of Rock 'n' Roll Circus. On the Oricon weekly chart, it peaked at second place and is currently still charting. The tour consisted of 32 shows across Japan and played to over 300,000 fans.

== Tour dates ==
Ayumi Hamasaki Arena Tour 2009 A: Next Level
Date (2009)	City	Venue	Attendance
April 11	Saitama	Saitama Super Arena	300,000
April 12	Saitama	Saitama Super Arena	300,000
April 15	Nagoya	Nippon Gaishi Hall	300,000
April 16	Nagoya	Nippon Gaishi Hall	300,000
April 21	Osaka	Osaka-jō Hall	300,000
April 22	Osaka	Osaka-jō Hall	300,000
April 25	Fukuroi	Ecopa Arena	300,000
April 29	Fukui	Sun Dome Fukui	300,000
May 2	Fukuoka	Marine Messe Fukuoka	300,000
May 3	Fukuoka	Marine Messe Fukuoka	300,000
May 9	Yokohama	Yokohama Arena	300,000
May 10	Yokohama	Yokohama Arena	300,000
May 13	Rifu	Sekisui Heim Super Arena	300,000
May 16	Hiroshima	Hiroshima Green Arena	300,000
May 20	Osaka	Osaka-jō Hall	300,000
May 21	Osaka	Osaka-jō Hall	300,000
May 27	Nagoya	Nippon Gaishi Hall	300,000
May 28	Nagoya	Nippon Gaishi Hall	300,000
June 6	Sapporo	Makomanai Ice Arena	300,000
June 13	Kobe	World Memorial Hall	300,000
June 14	Kobe	World Memorial Hall	300,000
June 18	Tokyo	Yoyogi National Gymnasium	300,000
June 20	Tokyo	Yoyogi National Gymnasium	300,000
June 21	Tokyo	Yoyogi National Gymnasium	300,000
July 1	Osaka	Osaka-jō Hall	300,000
July 2	Osaka	Osaka-jō Hall	300,000
July 8	Nagoya	Nippon Gaishi Hall	300,000
July 9	Nagoya	Nippon Gaishi Hall	300,000
August 3	Fukuoka	Marine Messe Fukuoka	300,000
August 4	Fukuoka	Marine Messe Fukuoka	300,000
August 21	Tokyo	Yoyogi National Gymnasium	300,000
August 22	Tokyo	Yoyogi National Gymnasium	300,000

== Track list ==
=== Disc 1 ===
1. Pieces of SEVEN
2. Rule
3. UNITE!
4. Disco-munication
5. EnergizE
6. Sunrise 〜LOVE is ALL〜
7. Load of the SHUGYO
8. LOVE 'n' HATE
9. identity
10. In The Corner
11. HOPE or PAIN
12. GREEN
13. Days
14. evolution
15. SIGNAL
16. rollin'
17. Sparkle
18. Bridge to the sky
19. NEXT LEVEL

=== Disc 2 ===
1. Curtain call
2. Sunset 〜LOVE is ALL〜
3. everywhere nowhere
4. Humming 7/4
5. Boys & Girls
6. MY ALL

=== Disc 3 ===
1. MC Time
2. Screen Videos (2 titles)
