= Blue Bird (Ayumi Hamasaki song) =

Single by Ayumi Hamasaki

from the album Secret
- B-side: "Beautiful Fighters"
- Released: June 21, 2006
- Recorded: Prime Sound Studio Form (Tokyo)
- Genre: Pop rock; electronic rock
- Length: 29:20
- Label: Avex Trax
- Songwriter(s): Ayumi Hamasaki (lyrics); DAI (music); Kazuhito Kikuchi (music)
- Producer(s): Max Matsuura

Ayumi Hamasaki singles chronology
"Startin'/Born to Be..." (2006)	"Blue Bird" (2006)	"Glitter/Fated" (2007)

Official Music Video
- "Blue Bird" on YouTube

Official Music Video
- "Beautiful Fighters" on YouTube

"Blue Bird" is a song by Japanese recording artist Ayumi Hamasaki. It was released as her 40th single under Avex Trax on June 21, 2006. "Blue Bird" was Hamasaki's 15th consecutive single to top the Oricon Singles Chart and 27th number one single in total. Initially planned to be a triple A-side single, it features two new songs, "Blue Bird" and "Beautiful Fighters". "Blue Bird" was the CM song for Zespri Gold Kiwifruit while "Beautiful Fighters" is featured on a Panasonic D-snap and D-dock commercial. A rearrangement of "Ladies Night", featured in her (Miss)understood album, called "Ladies Night (Another Night)" (which was featured in an earlier Panasonic Lumix commercial) is also featured on this single. A trance remix to "Blue Bird" is also on the single. On her official website, she describes "Blue Bird" as being a summer song, and "Beautiful Fighters" as being a song praising women.

"Blue Bird" also reunited Hamasaki with the composer Dai. "Blue Bird" was the first time he composed a song for Hamasaki since "Will" (2005), which she co-composed under the name Crea. "Blue Bird" was Hamasaki's first single to be certified platinum since 2005's "Heaven" and was her last single to achieve platinum status until "Mirrorcle World" (2008). The sales of "Blue Bird" made Hamasaki the first solo artist in Japan to sell over 20 million singles.

== Music videos ==
The "Blue Bird" PV officially aired on SpaceShower TV on June 9, 2006. In the first scene, she is singing on an empty beach. She is then seen on a boat with friends (many of whom are featured in her Fairyland PV, while they are in fact her dance team members). Throughout the video, it switches between the first setting, the second setting, and a third setting in which she is feasting and having fun with the same friends. There is also a fourth setting where she sings on a cliff. The PV was filmed in Guam.

The "Beautiful Fighters" PV officially aired on SpaceShower TV on June 12, 2006. In the first scene, fans anticipate entering what looks to be an arena, while three dancers stand outside the door. The fans rush in to watch Ayumi and a group of dancers atop a stage dancing and standing on multi-colored cars. The video switches between scenes of the five female dancers' stories of misfortune at different jobs. The dancers are shown as a delivery person, a waitress, a pool-cleaner, and a painter; Ayumi plays as a cashier at a mart. At the end, each person involved in the dancers' mess-up is shown dancing in the crowd and then each of the dancers, along with Ayumi, circles the stage in her own car.

== Commercial performance ==
The single debuted at number one on the Japanese Oricon chart. It outsold the number two single by 104,268 copies. The first track "Blue Bird" debuted at number one on iTunes Japan and the second track "Beautiful Fighters" debuted at number 10. The single recorded the third highest first-week sales for a single by a Japanese female artist in 2006. In 2007 Avex reported that "Blue Bird" had sold 322,000 copies.

== CD (Jacket C) track listing ==
1. "Blue Bird" – 4:09
  Mixed by Koji Morimoto
  Arranged by Hal
  Composed by Dai
2. "Beautiful Fighters" – 5:17
  Mixed by Koji Morimoto
  Arranged by CMJK
  Composed by Kazuhito Kikuchi
3. "Ladies Night ~Another Night~" – 4:04
  Re-arranged by Tasuku
4. "Blue Bird" (Harderground remix) – 6:24
  Remixed by Nish
5. "Blue Bird" (Instrumental) – 4:09
6. "Beautiful Fighters" (Instrumental) – 5:17

== DVD (Jacket A) track listing ==
1. "Blue Bird" (PV)
2. "Beautiful Fighters" (PV)
3. "Blue Bird" (Making Clip)

== DVD (Jacket B) track listing ==
1. "Blue Bird" (PV)
2. "Beautiful Fighters" (PV)
3. "Beautiful Fighters" (Making Clip)

== Live performances ==
- June 11, 2006 – Domoto Kyodai – "Blue Bird"
- June 16, 2006 – Music Station – "Blue Bird"
- June 23, 2006 – Music Fighter – "Blue Bird"
- June 23, 2006 – Music Station – "Blue Bird"
- June 24, 2006 – CDTV – "Blue Bird"
- June 25, 2006 – Avex Shareholders Meeting – "Blue Bird"

== Charts ==
=== Weekly charts ===
Chart (2006)	Peak position
Japan Singles (Oricon)	1

=== Year-end charts ===
Chart (2006)	Position
Japan Singles (Oricon)	32

== Sales and certifications ==
Region	Certification	Certified units/sales
Japan (RIAJ) Physical single	Platinum	250,000^{^}
Japan (RIAJ) Digital download	Platinum	250,000^{*}
Japan (RIAJ) Chaku-uta	3× Platinum	750,000^{*}
Streaming
Japan (RIAJ)	Gold	50,000,000^{†}
^{*} Sales figures based on certification alone.^{^} Shipments figures based on certification alone.^{†} Streaming-only figures based on certification alone.
