= Whatever (Ayumi Hamasaki song) =

- Mini CD cover art

Single by Ayumi Hamasaki

from the album Loveppears
- B-side: "Whatever" (J version)
- Released: February 10, 1999
- Recorded: 1999; Avex Studios; (Tokyo, Japan)
- Genre: Techno; trance; J-pop
- Length: 5:36
- Label: Avex Trax
- Songwriter(s): Ayumi Hamasaki
- Producer(s): Max Matsuura

Ayumi Hamasaki singles chronology
| "Depend on You" (1998) | "Whatever" (1999) | "Love (Destiny)" (1999) |

Official Music Video
- "Whatever" on YouTube

"Whatever" (stylized as "WHATEVER") is a song by Japanese singer Ayumi Hamasaki. It was released by Avex Trax on February 10, 1999, and later distributed in a variety of formats throughout Asia. It also serves as the lead single for Hamasaki's second studio album, Loveppears (1999). It was written by Hamasaki, composed by Kazuhito Kikuchi, and produced by Max Matsuura, who also produced the parent album. It was re-released twice, once in 2001 with additional content on a CD single format and again as a double A-side vinyl with her single "Appears".

"Whatever" was originally released in two mixes: the M version, arranged by Izumi "D.M.X." Miyazaki, is a techno-trance-inspired track, and the J version, arranged by Kikuchi, appeared only on the singles formats. Like the rest of the album, the song is performed in the third-person narrative; lyrically, it discusses having ambivalent feelings for someone. "Whatever" received positive reviews from music critics, who praised its dance-oriented nature and cited it as a standout track from the album and Hamasaki’s career.

Commercially, "Whatever" peaked at number five on the Oricon Singles Chart, while the re-issued version reached number 28. It was certified gold by the Recording Industry Association of Japan (RIAJ) after exceeding 200,000 shipments in Japan. Wataru Takeishi created a music video that features Hamasaki in a room with a built-in water feature, as well as scenes of a young child dressed as an angel walking through and observing a distressed landscape. Since its release, "Whatever" has appeared on Hamasaki's remix and compilation albums, as well as on several of the singer's concert tours.

== Background and composition ==
"Whatever"
A sample of "Whatever," a techno and trance track that speaks about being unsure or uncertain about a relationship

On January 1, 1999, Hamasaki released her first studio album, A Song for xx. The record featured several singles, some of which had moderate success in Japan. Music critics praised the album's sound and identified Hamasaki as a promising act in Japanese pop music. Commercially, it peaked at number one on the region's Oricon Albums Chart and eventually sold over 1.6 million copies. However, one month after its release, Hamasaki began working on new music and announced the release of a new single titled "Whatever", which was released on February 10.

Hamasaki wrote the song, Kazuhito Kikuchi composed it, and Max Matsuura produced it. "Whatever" was originally released with two mixes. The first is the M version, which was arranged and mixed by Izumi "D.M.X." Miyazaki, and is a techno-trance number that lasts 5 minutes and 37 seconds. The second mix, the J version, was arranged by Kikuchi and mixed by Atsushi Hattori and is a J-pop track that lasts four minutes and 32 seconds. Hamasaki's second studio album, Loveppears (1999), featured an extended version of the song, labelled the Dub 1999 Club Mix. The lyrics, like the rest of the album, are performed in third-person narrative; lyrically, "Whatever" discusses having ambivalent feelings towards someone.

== Release and promotion ==
Avex Trax released "Whatever" on February 10, 1999, and it serves as the lead single for Loveppears. Avex Trax released the single on a mini CD in Japan and Taiwan, which included both the M and J versions, as well as their instrumental versions. The single was distributed on vinyl, which included the Dub 1999 Club mix, the M version, and its instrumental. The M version and its instrumental were the only tracks on a promotional CD released the same year. On January 28, 2000, "Whatever" was released as a double A-side with Hamasaki's single "Appears" on vinyl, featuring an extended remix version by Dutch DJ Ferry Corsten. On January 31, 2001, a limited edition extended play titled The Other Side Four: System F, Vincent De Moor was released, which included remixes of the single as well as her single "Fly High" (2000). On February 28, "Whatever" was repackaged as a standard CD single, which included all recorded versions of the single as well as remixes by Jonathan Peters. Shigeru Kasai designed the artwork for "Whatever", which features Hamasaki in a white dress with angel wings against a blue backdrop. The promotional cover includes an alternate shot of Hamasaki sitting with white feathers falling from above. The re-released cover is blue, with the original cover placed in the bottom left corner.

The tracks were used for the 7-Eleven Valentine's Day special in Japan, and the ending theme song to the TX Network show Asayan. She performed the song on various television shows across Japan, including Music Station, Count Down TV, Hey! Hey! Hey! Music Champ, Pocket Music, Pop Jam, Super Dream Live, and SMAPxSMAP. Since its release, the M version of "Whatever" has appeared on one of Hamasaki's greatest hits albums, A Complete: All Singles (2007). Many of Hamasaki's remix albums feature remixes of the song, including the four-part collection Ayu-mi-x II (2000), Super Eurobeat Presents Ayu-ro Mix (2000), and the acoustic orchestral version Ayu-mi-x 7 (2011). Remixes of the single have also appeared on some of Hamasaki's singles, such as "Appears" and "Vogue" (2000). "Whatever" has been performed on several of Hamasaki's concert tours, including her 2000 concert series, 2002 stadium countdown show, 2004-2005 countdown show, 2013 Premium Showcase show, Natsu no Trouble Premium live show, and Trouble Tour: Saigo no Trouble. The Dub 1999 Club mix was remastered and added to the 20th Anniversary Edition of Loveppears.

== Reception ==
"Whatever" received positive reviews from music critics. Neil Z. Yeung of AllMusic highlighted the track as one of the album's standouts, describing it as "high energy" with album tracks "Fly High" and "Boys & Girls" and going on to say that they "took Hamasaki straight to the dancefloor." The same publication selected "Whatever" as a career highlight for Hamasaki. CDJournal praised the M version and its overall sound, referring to it as a "hyper" tune. Erica Russell of PopCrush selected the Dub 1999 Club mix as an essential to Hamasaki's catalogue, describing it as "frenzied" and "represents peak turn-of-the-century J-pop: progressive trance beats, sugary, soaring vocals and a surplus of DDR-friendly manic energy." In a Goo poll in which the audience was asked to vote on Hamasaki's most popular songs, "Whatever" was ranked 30th, with 13.6% of the votes.

Commercially, the mini CD format peaked at number five on the Oricon Singles Chart, selling 70,940 copies in its first week and remaining on the chart for nine weeks. After its re-release, "Whatever" peaked at number 28 on the same chart for three weeks, selling over 27,000 units. With its appearance on The Other Side Four: System F, Vincent De Moor, it peaked at number 11 and remained on the chart for three weeks. The first two formats also appeared on the TBS Count Down TV chart, where they peaked at number five and 29, respectively. The vinyl releases of "Whatever" and "Appears" reached number 96 on the same chart. The Recording Industry Association of Japan (RIAJ) certified "Whatever" gold for shipping more than 200,000 units.

== Music video ==
The music video for "Whatever" features Hamasaki (pictured) in a small room with built-in water features, and bears a similar resemblance to the single's cover art with its depiction of angels

Wataru Takeishi directed the music video for "Whatever", his first collaboration since working with Hamasaki on her single "Trust" in 1998. The music video begins with Hamasaki sitting inside a silver room with a silver table and built-in water feature; the majority of these scenes include panning and tracking shots, close-ups, and aerial shots of Hamasaki with added video effects. The video includes scenes of a young child dressed as an angel walking through and observing a destroyed landscape. Near the end of the video, the child attempts to reach for a flower behind barbed wire but becomes stuck in the process. The video concludes with a panning shot of Hamasaki wearing a similar angel costume inside a birdcage-like confinement. The full visual was added to Hamasaki’s YouTube channel on October 2, 2019.

The visual shots are similar to the artwork packaging for "Whatever". Scenes from the video were used as commercials to promote the single in Japan. Takeishi also directed a second commercial using the J version, which featured Hamasaki singing the song in a black dress against a flowy orange-red backdrop; the full version of the video was never released. The M version has appeared on Hamasaki's video albums, including A Clips (2000), her 2000 self-titled release, Complete Clip Box (2004), and A Clip Box 1998-2011 (2011), with commercials for both the M and J versions added to the latter three releases. In addition, the M version was included in the limited editions of the 20th Anniversary Edition of Loveppears.

== Track listings ==
- Mini CD / digital
1. "Whatever" (version M) – 5:33
2. "Whatever" (version J) – 4:30
3. "Whatever" (version M Instrumental) – 5:33
4. "Whatever" (version J Instrumental) – 4:30
- Promotional mini CD
1. "Whatever" (version M) – 5:33
2. "Whatever" (version M Instrumental) – 5:33
- 12-inch vinyl
1. "Whatever" (Dub's 1999 Club Remix) – 7:25
2. "Whatever" (version M) – 5:33
3. "Whatever" (version M Instrumental) – 5:33
- Ferry Corsten 12-inch vinyl
1. "Whatever" (Ferry 'System F' Corsten vocal extended mix) – 6:31
2. "Whatever" (Ferry 'System F' Corsten vocal dub mix) – 7:26
- "Appears" / "Whatever" 12-inch vinyl
1. "Appears" (JP's SoundFactory Mix) – 7:59
2. "Appears (Keith Litman's Mix Of Truth) – 8:24
3. "Whatever" (Ferry 'System F' Corsten vocal extended mix) – 6:31
- 2001 CD single / digital / streaming
1. "Whatever" (version M) – 5:33
2. "Whatever" (version J) – 4:30
3. "Whatever" (Ferry 'System F' Corsten vocal extended mix) – 6:31
4. "Appears" (JP's SoundFactory mix) – 8:00
5. "Immature" (D-Z Dual Lucifer mix) – 4:36
6. "Whatever" (version M Instrumental) – 5:33
7. "Whatever" (version J Instrumental) – 4:30

== Personnel ==
Credits adapted from the liner notes of Loveppears.

Song credits

- Ayumi Hamasaki - songwriting, vocals
- Max Matsuura - production
- Kazuhito Kikuchi - composer
- Izumi Miyazaki - arrangement
- Shigeru Kasai - design

Visual and video credits

- Kiyoshi Utsumi - art direction
- Wataru Takeishi - director
- Yoshiko Ishibashi - production manager
- Tetsuji Nakamichi - assistant director
- Tetsuya Kamoto - photographer
- Koji Noguchi - lighting
- Koji Matsumoto - stylist
- Chu and Tamotsu - hair and make-up assistant

== Charts and certifications ==
=== Weekly charts ===
| Chart (1999) | Peak position |
|---|---|
| Japan Singles (Oricon) | 5 |
| Japan Singles (TBS) | 5 |

| Chart (2000) | Peak position |
|---|---|
| Japan Single (TBS) | 96 |

| Chart (2001) | Peak position |
|---|---|
| Japan Singles (Oricon) | 28 |
| Japan Singles (TBS) | 29 |

=== Certifications ===
| Region | Certification | Certified units/sales |
|---|---|---|
| Japan (RIAJ) | Gold | 200,000^{^} |
| Japan CD single | — | 27,560 |
^{^} Shipments figures based on certification alone.

== Release history ==
"Whatever" release history
| Region | Date | Format | Label | Ref. |
|---|---|---|---|---|
| Japan | February 10, 1999 | Mini CD | Avex Trax | |
| Taiwan | March 5, 1999 | Mini CD | Avex Trax | |
| Japan | 1999 | Vinyl | Avex Trax | |
| Japan | 1999 | Promotional CD | Avex Trax | |
| Japan | 2000 | Vinyl | Avex Trax | |
| Japan | January 28, 2000 | "Appears" / "Whatever" vinyl | Rhythm Republic | |
| Japan | February 28, 2001 | CD single | Avex Trax | |
| Taiwan | March 7, 2001 | CD single | Avex Trax | |

== See also ==
- Ayumi Hamasaki discography
