= Appears =

1999 song by Ayumi Hamasaki

- Japanese vinyl (part 1), CD, and worldwide digital cover artwork.

Single by Ayumi Hamasaki

from the album Loveppears
- A-side: "Immature"
- Released: November 10, 1999
- Recorded: 1999
- Genre: Trance
- Length: 5:38
- Label: Avex Trax; Avex USA; Avex Entertainment Inc.; Drizzly Records; Rhythm Republic
- Songwriter: Ayumi Hamasaki
- Producer: Max Matsuura

Ayumi Hamasaki singles chronology
"A" (1999)	"Appears" (1999)	"Kanariya" (1999)

Ayumi Hamasaki German singles chronology
"Naturally" (2004)	"Appears" (2005)	"Unite!" (2005)

Official Music Video
- "Appears" on YouTube

"Appears" is a song recorded by Japanese recording artist Ayumi Hamasaki. It was released by Avex Trax on November 10, 1999, as the sixth single from her second studio album Loveppears (1999), which was released on the same day. Alongside this, it has been released in several other territories with different release dates under her Western alias Ayu. It also served as Hamasaki's first limited-edition single, limiting physical sales to 300,000 copies. The track was written by Hamasaki herself, while production was handled by long-time collaborator Max Matsuura. Musically, "Appears" is a dance song written in third person perspective, and is about the third person watching what appears to be a happy and loving relationship. Upon its release, "Appears" received positive reviews from music critics. Alexey Eremenko, writing for AllMusic, selected the track as the best song from the album and her career. However, an editor from CD Journal criticized the amount of remixes on the CD single.

Commercially, the single was a success in Japan, peaking at number two on the Oricon Singles Chart and TBS' Count Down TV chart. It sold just below its restricted 300,000 units, and was certified Gold by the Recording Industry Association of Japan (RIAJ) for shipments of 200,000 units. An accompanying music video was directed by Wataru Takeishi, which displays Hamasaki walking around New York City and observing people. To promote the single, it appeared on several remix and greatest hits compilation albums conducted by Hamasaki, and has been included on some of her concert tours, including part two of her 2000 concert tour and the 2007 Secret Tour.

== Background and composition ==
"Appears" was written by Hamasaki herself, while production was handled by longtime collaborator Max Matsuura. The song's instrumentation consists of guitar by musician Naoya Akimoto and keyboards by Japanese pop band HΛL. It was then composed together by Kazuhito Kikuchi and mixed by HΛL. An alternative version of "Appears" was released as the single-edit, which was primarily composed and mixed by Kikuchi, but this edit did not appear on the final cut of Hamasaki's second studio album Loveppears (1999). Musically, "Appears" is a dance song, a genre that is heavily influenced throughout the parent album.

In a special commentary for Hamasaki's compilation album A Ballads (2003), where a third version of the track is included, she stated that the lyrical content was written in third person perspective, a trait that is shared with the rest of the album's tracks. She stated that the song is about the third person watching a happy and loving relationship: "It's about lovers who appear to be happy and are living each day in their usual way. But there is a sense that a third person is watching from a distance." The song's title is loosely based on the album's title Loveppears, which was originally planned to be called "Lovers Appear".

== Release ==
"Appears" was released by Avex Trax on November 10, 1999, as the sixth single from the album, which was also released on the same day. The CD single, which was distributed in Japan and Hong Kong, included 12 tracks: six remixes of "Appears", two remixes of her previous single "Whatever", and two remixes of her previous promotional single "Immature". The last two tracks are instrumentals of the HΛL remix and Keisuke Kikuchi remix of "Appears" and "Immature" (titled '99 Greetings Mix and JT Original CM Mix). Two separate 12" vinyls were distributed by Japanese label Rhythm Republic, featuring remixes of both "Appears" and "Whatever". It was Hamasaki's first single to be distributed in North America, which was remixed by American DJ Junior Vasquez and released on May 27, 2001. It was furthered distributed by Drizzly Records throughout Europe in 2005–06 under Hamasaki's Western alias Ayu; it was released on 12" vinyl and CD single formats.

The nudity of the cover's key visuals and artwork drew a huge response from young people at the time, and a naming trend was established in which Loveppears, released on the same day, was called "White Ayu" and the single "Appears" was called "Black Ayu". During the album photo shoot, Hamasaki said, "The idea for the jacket came from Ayu's opinion at a meeting with the staff. You may think, 'What?' but I wanted to say 'No clothes on my waist!'" and made an impromptu decision to cover her breasts with her hair.

== Reception ==
Upon its release, "Appears" received positive reviews from music critics. AllMusic's Alexey Eremenko, whom contributed to writing Hamasaki's biography on the website, selected the track as some of her best work. A mixed review came from a staff member at CD Journal, who questioned the inclusion of remixes on the CD single. Though the editor commended the club inspired composition, he/she criticized how it took over Hamasaki's vocal performance and felt the sound was slightly "geeky". Commercially, the single was a success in Japan. It debuted at number two on the Oricon Singles Chart, selling 273,760 units in its first week of sales. It lasted three weeks on the top 200, becoming one of Hamasaki's lowest spanning singles in that chart. It debuted at number two on the Count Down TV chart hosted by Tokyo Broadcasting System (TBS), stalled from the top spot by Hikaru Utada's "Addicted to You". It lasted four weeks in the top 100. Part one of the "Appears"/"Whatever" 12" vinyl reached number 96 on the same chart, entering on chart date February 5, 2000.

By the end of 1999, "Appears" had sold 282,170 units in Japan, making it the 81st highest selling single of that year in that country; it was also Hamasaki's fifth addition on the Oricon Yearly Chart, just behind her singles "To Be", "Love (Destiny)", "Boys & Girls", and her extended play A (1999). That same year, it ranked at number 84 on TBS' Annual Chart. In January 2000, the single was certified Gold by the Recording Industry Association of Japan (RIAJ) for shipments of 200,000 units. As of July 2016, "Appears" has sold 290,550 units in Japan, and is her 28th highest selling single based on Oricon Style's data base.

== Music video and promotion ==
An accompanying music video was directed by Wataru Takeishi. The video opens with shots of New York City, and then has Hamasaki on a rooftop. Hamasaki is then singing the track with several different camera angles circulating her and the city. During the first verse, it has her in an apartment, sitting on a couch with a butterfly hair clip; this scene is used throughout the entire video. It then has three shots of her in different clothes; one with a brown leather jacket, brown wig and cowboy hat, the second with a red dress on, and the third with a black jacket and crop hair style. The shot with her in the brown leather jacket, brown wig and cowboy hat then shows her on a rooftop singing the song. The final pre-chorus and chorus has her driving through New York City, and has her in a pink dress watching the snow fall; it ends with her in the red dress, holding her hands out for the snow to fall. The music video was included on several DVD compilations released by Hamasaki: A Clips (2000), A Complete Box Set (2004), the digital release of A Clips Complete (2014), and the DVD and Blu-Ray re-release edition of her 2001 compilation album A Best (2016).

On the December 24, 1999 broadcast of Music Station Special Super Live 99, Hamasaki was seen crying while singing. At the time, the reason for her tears was a mystery, which led to various speculations. The following year, on the December 29, 2000 broadcast of Music Station Special Super Live 2000, she stated in her pre-singing talk that she had "choked while singing." However, she later revealed in her novel M Aisubeki Hito ga Ite that in fact it was right after her breakup with Avex Inc.'s chairman and CEO, Max Matsuura.

"Appears" has been heavily promoted on compilation albums and live performances. As of July 2016, it has been included on eight of Hamasaki's remix albums, including Super Eurobeat Presents Ayu-ro Mix (2000) and Ayu-mi-x II Version Non-Stop Mega Mix (2001). The single has also been used on greatest hits albums conducted by Hamasaki, including A Best (2001), the HΛL's remix on A Ballads (2003), A Complete: All Singles (2007), and most recently on her 2014 Christmas compilation Winter Ballad Selection. It was specially remixed by Junior Vasquez and added onto Hamasaki's remix extended play, The Other Side Two: Junior Vasquez. The single has been included on three major concert tours hosted by Hamasaki, including part two of her 2000 concert tour, her 2007 Secret Tour, and her 2012 Hotel Love Songs tour in Japan.

== Track listing and formats ==
- CD single
1. "Appears" ('99 Greeting Mix) – 5:38
2. "Appears" (Scud Filter Mix) – 6:03
3. "Appears" (Dub's Eurotech Remix) – 8:03
4. "Whatever" (Ferry 'System F' Corsten Dub Mix) – 7:38
5. "Appears" (JP's SoundFactory Mix) – 7:58
6. "Appears" (HAL's Mix) – 4:41
7. "Immature" (D-Z Dual Lucifer Mix) – 4:35
8. "Whatever" (Ferry 'System F' Corsten Vocal Extended Mix) – 6:29
9. "Appears" (Keith Litman's Mix Of Truth) – 8:25
10. "Immature" (JT Original CM Version) – 4:45
11. "Appears" (Scud Filter Mix) [Instrumental] – 6:03
12. "Immature" (JT Original CM Version) [Instrumental] – 4:45
- "Appears" / "Whatever" 12" vinyl (Part 1)
1. "Appears" (Dub's Eurotech Remix) – 8:03
2. "Appears" (HAL's Mix) – 4:41
3. "Appears" (Scud Filter Mix) – 6:03
4. "Appears" ('99 Greeting Mix) – 5:38
- "Appears" / "Whatever" 12" vinyl (Part 2)
1. "Appears" (JP's SoundFactory Mix) – 7:58
2. "Appears" (Keith Litman's Mix Of Truth) – 8:25
3. "Whatever" (Ferry 'System F' Corsten Vocal Extended Mix) – 6:29
- US vinyl
1. "Appears" (Junior's Club Mix) – 9:41
2. "Appears" (Junior's Instrumental) – 9:45
3. "Appears" (Junior's Padapella) – 8:02
- "Appears" / "Immature" 12" vinyl
1. Appears" ('99 Greeting Mix) – 5:38
2. "Immature" (JT Original CM Version) – 4:45
- Germany 12" vinyl
1. "Appears" (Armin van Buuren's Rising Star 12" Instr. Mix) – 9:11
2. "Appears" (Armin van Buuren's Sunset Dub Mix) – 9:23
3. "Appears" (Kyau vs. Albert Remix) – 8:15
4. "Appears" (Kyau vs. Albert Dub) – 7:58
5. "Appears" (Vince The Saint vs. Villa Remix) – 6:08
- German CD single
1. "Appears" (Armin van Buuren's Rising Star Radio Edit) – 4:08
2. "Appears" (Kyau vs. Albert Radio Edit) – 3:38
3. "Appears" (Armin van Buuren's Rising Star 12" Mix) – 9:11
4. "Appears" (Kyau vs. Albert Dub) – 7:58
5. "Appears" (Vince The Saint vs. Villa Remix) – 6:08
- UK CD Single
1. "Appears" (Armin van Buuren's Rising Star 12" Mix) – 9:11
2. "Appears" (Kyau vs. Albert Remix) – 8:15
3. "Appears" (Vince The Saint vs. Villa Remix) – 6:08
4. "Appears" (Armin van Buuren's Rising Dub Mix) – 9:20
5. "Appears" (Kyau vs. Albert Dub) – 7:58
6. "Appears" – 9:14
- Digital download
1. "Appears" ('99 Greeting Mix) – 5:38
2. "Appears" (Scud Filter Mix) – 6:03
3. "Appears" (Dub's Eurotech Remix) – 8:03
4. "Whatever" (Ferry 'System F' Corsten Dub Mix) – 7:38
5. "Appears" (JP's SoundFactory Mix) – 7:58
6. "Appears" (HAL's Mix) – 4:41
7. "Immature" (D-Z Dual Lucifer Mix) – 4:35
8. "Whatever" (Ferry 'System F' Corsten Vocal Extended Mix) – 6:29
9. "Appears" (Keith Litman's Mix Of Truth) – 8:25
10. "Immature" (JT Original CM Version) – 4:45
11. "Appears" ('99 Greeting Mix) – 5:38
12. "Appears" (Scud Filter Mix) [Instrumental] – 6:03
13. "Immature" (JT Original CM Version) [Instrumental] – 4:45

== Personnel ==
Credits adapted from the CD liner notes of Loveppears;

Recording

- Recorded at Soundtrack Studios, New York City, New York, US.

Credits

- Ayumi Hamasaki – vocals, songwriting, background vocals
- Max Matsuura – production
- Kazuhito Kikuchi – composing, programming, mixing
- Naoya Akimoto – guitar
- HΛL – keyboards, programming
- Wataru Takeishi – music video director
- Dave Way – mixing

== Charts ==
=== Weekly charts ===
Chart (1999)	Peak position
Japan Singles (Oricon)	2
Japan Count Down TV (TBS)	2

Chart (2000)	Peak position
Japan Count Down TV (TBS) (Note: Charted together with Hamasaki's single "Whatever" on vinyl format.)	96

=== Monthly charts ===
Chart (1999)	Peak position
Japan Singles (Oricon)	8

=== Yearly chart ===
Chart (1999)	Position
Japan Singles (Oricon)	81
Japan Count Down TV (TBS)	84
Taiwan (Hito Radio)	32

== Certification ==
Region	Certification	Certified units/sales
Japan (RIAJ)	Gold	290,550

== Release history ==
Region	Date	Format	Label
Japan	November 10, 1999	CD single	Avex Trax; Avex Entertainment Inc.
Hong Kong	November 10, 1999	CD single	Avex Trax; Avex Entertainment Inc.
Japan	January 28, 2000	12" vinyl	Rhythm Republic
Japan	January 28, 2000	"Appears"/"Immature" 12" vinyl	Rhythm Republic
Japan	March 22, 2000	12" vinyl	Rhythm Republic
United States	May 27, 2001	12" vinyl	Avex USA
Germany	April 18, 2005	12" vinyl	Drizzly Records
Europe	April 18, 2005	CD single	Drizzly Records
United Kingdom	2006	CD single	Drizzly Records
Japan	September 2008 (Note: There is currently insufficient evidence to determine what date Hamasaki's digital releases appeared on online retails. The closest source for iTunes Store evidence is at Jame World, whom confirmed Hamasaki's work was released worldwide on iTunes in September 2008.)	Digital download	Avex Trax; Avex Entertainment Inc.
