= List of awards and nominations received by Ayumi Hamasaki =

Ayumi Hamasaki awards and nominations
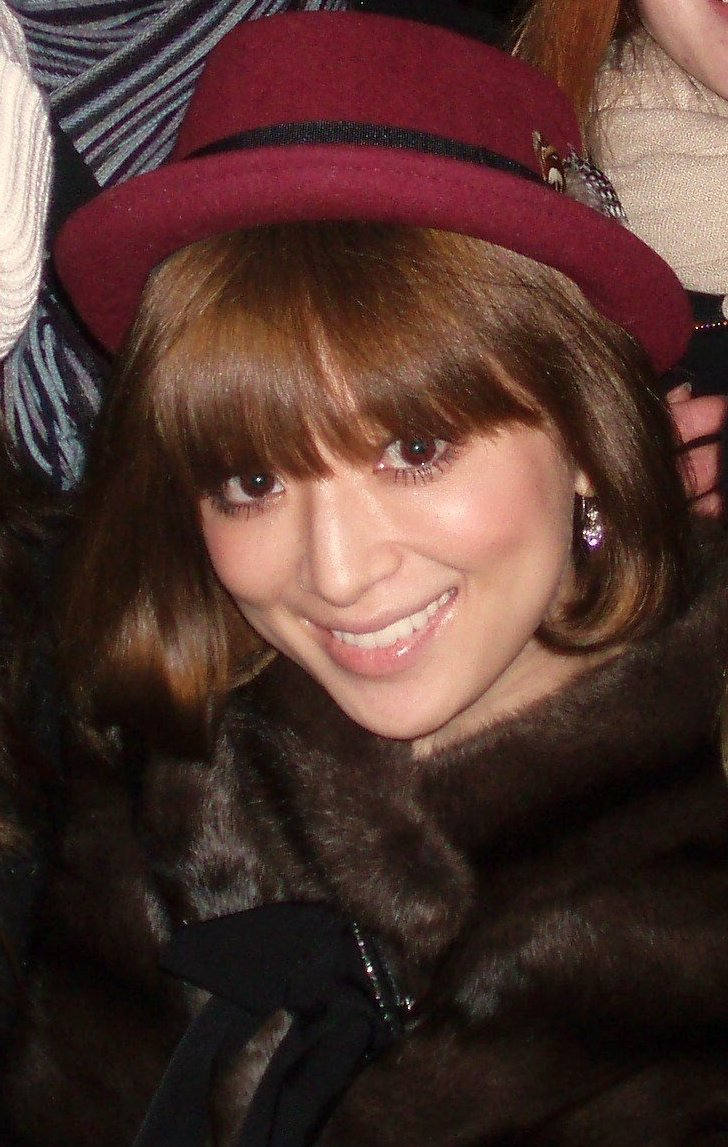
- Hamasaki in 2010
Awards and nominations
Award	Wins	Nominations

Totals (Note: Certain award groups do not simply award one winner. They acknowledge several different recipients, have runners-up, and have third place. Since this is a specific recognition and is different from losing an award, runner-up mentions are considered wins in this award tally. For simplification and to avoid errors, each award in this list has been presumed to have had a prior nomination.)
- Wins: 77
- Nominations: 87

Japanese singer-songwriter Ayumi Hamasaki has won numerous awards, including 23 Japan Gold Disc Awards, 8 Japan Record Awards, 3 MTV Video Music Awards Japan and two MTV Asia Awards.

== Awards and nominations ==
Name of award ceremony, year presented, award category, nominee of award, and result of nomination
Award ceremony	Year	Category	Nominee(s) / Work(s)	Result	Ref.
All Japan Cable Broadcasting Awards	1999	Grand Prix	Ayumi Hamasaki	Won	
All Japan Cable Broadcasting Awards	2002	Grand Prix	Ayumi Hamasaki	Won	
All Japan Cable Broadcasting Awards	2003	Grand Prix	Ayumi Hamasaki	Won	
Asian Pop Music Awards	2023	Top 20 Albums of the Year (Overseas)	Remember You	Won	
Asian Pop Music Awards	2023	Best Album of the Year (Overseas)	Remember You	Nominated	
Asian Pop Music Awards	2023	Best Lyricist (Overseas)	Ayumi Hamasaki	Won	
Creative 3D Arts Awards	2012	Electronic Broadcast Media, Live Event Award	Ayumi Hamasaki Arena Tour 2009 A: Next Level	Won	
French J-Awards	2008	Best Album of 2008	A Complete ~All Singles~	Won	
French J-Awards	2008	Most Wanted Japanese Artist in France for 2009	Ayumi Hamasaki	Won	
Green Globe Film Awards	2010	Best Asian Entertainer	Ayumi Hamasaki	Won	
Hito Music Awards	2003	Best Asian Song	"Voyage"	Won	
Hito Music Awards	2004	Best Asian Song	"Real Me"	Won	
Hito Music Awards	2005	Best Asian Song	"Moments"	Won	
Hito Music Awards	2006	Best Asian Song	"My Name's Women"	Won	
Hito Music Awards	2008	Best Asian Song	"Jewel"	Won	
Japan Cable Awards	2001	Grand Prix	Ayumi Hamasaki	Won	
Japan Cable Awards	2002	Grand Prix	Ayumi Hamasaki	Won	
Japan Gold Disc Awards	1999	New Artist of the Year	Ayumi Hamasaki	Won	
Japan Gold Disc Awards	1999	Pop Album of the Year	A Song for ××	Won	
Japan Gold Disc Awards	2000	Pop Album of the Year	Loveppears	Won	
Japan Gold Disc Awards	2000	Song of the Year	"A"	Won	
Japan Gold Disc Awards	2001	Artist of the Year	Ayumi Hamasaki	Won	
Japan Gold Disc Awards	2001	Pop Album of the Year	Duty	Won	
Japan Gold Disc Awards	2001	Song of the Year	"M"	Won	
Japan Gold Disc Awards	2001	Song of the Year	"Seasons"	Won	
Japan Gold Disc Awards	2002	Artist of the Year	Ayumi Hamasaki	Won	
Japan Gold Disc Awards	2002	Pop Album of the Year	A Best, I am…	Won	
Japan Gold Disc Awards	2003	Song of the Year	"Free & Easy"	Won	
Japan Gold Disc Awards	2003	Song of the Year	"H"	Won	
Japan Gold Disc Awards	2003	Song of the Year	"Voyage"	Won	
Japan Gold Disc Awards	2003	Rock & Pop Album of the Year	Rainbow	Won	
Japan Gold Disc Awards	2004	Artist of the Year	Ayumi Hamasaki	Won	
Japan Gold Disc Awards	2004	Rock & Pop Album of the Year	A Ballads	Won	
Japan Gold Disc Awards	2004	Rock & Pop Album of the Year	&	Won	
Japan Gold Disc Awards	2004	Rock & Pop Album of the Year	Memorial Address	Won	
Japan Gold Disc Awards	2005	Song of the Year	"Moments"	Won	
Japan Gold Disc Awards	2005	Song of the Year	"Inspire"	Won	
Japan Gold Disc Awards	2007	The 10 Best Albums	(Miss)understood	Won	
Japan Gold Disc Awards	2007	The 10 Best Albums	Secret	Won	
Japan Gold Disc Awards	2009	The 10 Best Albums	A Complete ~All Singles~	Won	
Japan Record Awards	1999	Best Album Award	A Song for ××	Won	
Japan Record Awards	1999	Excellence Award	"Boys & Girls"	Won	
Japan Record Awards	2000	Album of the Year	Duty	Won	
Japan Record Awards	2000	Best Album Award	Duty	Won	
Japan Record Awards	2000	Lyricist Award	Ayumi Hamasaki	Won	
Japan Record Awards	2000	Excellence Award	"Seasons"	Won	
Japan Record Awards	2001	Grand Prix	"Dearest"	Won	
Japan Record Awards	2001	Excellence Award	"Dearest"	Won	
Japan Record Awards	2002	Grand Prix	"Voyage"	Won	
Japan Record Awards	2002	Excellence Award	"Voyage"	Won	
Japan Record Awards	2003	Grand Prix	"No Way to Say"	Won	
Japan Record Awards	2003	Excellence Award	"No Way to Say"	Won	
Japan Record Awards	2024	Special Award	Ayumi Hamasaki	Won	
J-Station Awards	2010	Best Female Artist	Ayumi Hamasaki	Won	
J-Station Awards	2010	Best Pop Album	Rock 'n' Roll Circus	Won	
J-Station Awards	2010	Best Music Video	"Microphone"	Won	
J-Station Awards	2010	Best Mini-Drama Clip	"Blossom"	Won	
J-Station Awards	2010	Best Collaboration	"Dream On" (Naoya Urata featuring Ayumi Hamasaki)	Won	
MTV Asia Awards	2002	Most Influential Artist in Asia Award	Ayumi Hamasaki	Won	
MTV Student Voice Awards	2008	Best Female Artist	Ayumi Hamasaki	Won	
MTV Video Music Awards Japan	2002	Best Female Artist	Ayumi Hamasaki	Won	
MTV Video Music Awards Japan	2002	Video of the Year	"Dearest"	Nominated	
MTV Video Music Awards Japan	2002	Best Pop	Ayumi Hamasaki	Nominated	
MTV Video Music Awards Japan	2003	Best Pop Video	"Real Me"	Nominated	
MTV Video Music Awards Japan	2004	Best Female Video	"Because of You"	Won	
MTV Video Music Awards Japan	2004	Best Pop Video	"No Way to Say"	Won	
MTV Video Music Awards Japan	2004	Best Live Performance	Ayumi Hamasaki	Won	
MTV Video Music Awards Japan	2005	Best Female Video	"Inspire"	Nominated	
MTV Video Music Awards Japan	2006	Best Pop Video	"Fairyland"	Nominated	
Musicnet Awards	2005	Best Album	My Story	Won	
Musicnet Awards	2006	Best Artist	Ayumi Hamasaki	Won	
Musicnet Awards	2006	Best Album	(Miss)understood	Won	
Musicnet Awards	2006	Best Single	"Heaven"	Won	
Musicnet Awards	2006	Best Concert Video	Arena Tour 2005: My Story	Won	
Musicnet Awards	2008	Best Artist	Ayumi Hamasaki	Won	
Musicnet Awards	2008	Best Album	A Best 2	Won	
Musicnet Awards	2008	Best Single	"Talkin' 2 Myself"	Won	
Musicnet Awards	2008	Best Concert Video	Asia Tour 2007: Tour of Secret	Won	
Oricon Chart Awards	2003	Best Selling Album Title Award		Won	
Oricon Chart Awards	2003	Best Hit Award		Won	
RTHK International Pop Poll Awards	2007	Top Japanese Gold Songs	"Secret"	Gold	
Space Shower Music Awards	2002	Best Video of the Year	"Dearest"	Nominated	
Space Shower Music Awards	2008	Art Direction Video	"Part of Me"	Nominated	
Space Shower Music Awards	2009	Art Direction Video	"Green"	Nominated	
Space Shower Music Awards	2011	Best Female Video	"Virgin Road"	Nominated	
Weibo Culture Exchange Night	2025	Best Artist		Won	
World Music Awards	2001	Best Japanese Pop/Rock Artist	Ayumi Hamasaki	Won	
World Music Awards	2001	World's Best-Selling Asian Artist	Ayumi Hamasaki	Won	
World Music Awards	2003	Best Japanese Pop/Rock Artist	Ayumi Hamasaki	Won	
World Music Awards	2005	Best-Selling Japanese Artist	Ayumi Hamasaki	Won	
Yahoo! Asian Buzz Awards	2008	Best International Female Artist – Hong Kong	Ayumi Hamasaki	Won	
