= To Be (song) =

- Mini CD cover

Single by Ayumi Hamasaki

from the album Loveppears
- Released: May 12, 1999
- Recorded: 1999
- Genre: J-pop
- Length: 5:18
- Label: Avex Trax; Avex Taiwan; Avex Entertainment Inc.
- Songwriter: Ayumi Hamasaki
- Producer: Max Matsuura

Ayumi Hamasaki singles chronology
"Love (Destiny)" (1999)	"To Be" (1999)	"Boys & Girls" (1999)

Alternative cover
- CD single artwork

Official Music Video
- "To Be" on YouTube

"To Be" (stylized as "TO BE") is a song by Japanese recording artist Ayumi Hamasaki. It served as the third single from Hamasaki's second studio album Loveppears (1999). The track was released by Avex Trax in Japan and Taiwan on May 12, 1999, and through Avex Entertainment Inc. worldwide in September 2008. It was Hamasaki's final single to be distributed as a Mini-CD, a format that debuted at the start of her career in April 1998. "To Be" was written by Hamasaki herself, while production was handled by long-time collaborator Max Matsuura. Musically, it is a J-Pop that was written in third person perspective, much like the content from the parent album.

Upon its release, "To Be" received positive reviews from music critics. Some highlighted the single as one of Hamasaki's best works, and complimented the composition and Hamasaki's vocals. Commercially, the single was a success in Japan, reaching number four on both the Oricon Singles Chart and TBS' Count Down TV chart. It was certified Gold by the Recording Industry Association of Japan (RIAJ) for shipments of 200,000 units. Due to the single's success, it was re-released as a CD single and re-entered both record charts.

An accompanying music video was directed by Wataru Takeishi, which featured Hamasaki in a kaleidoscope with several clones of her in a variety of colorful clothing. To promote the single, it appeared on several remix and greatest hits compilation albums, in addition to various live concert tours conducted by Hamasaki. It was used as the official theme song for a peach water commercial that was advertised in Japan. The song was covered by Chinese recording artist An Youqi in 2006, and released as a single.

== Background and release ==
"To Be" was written by Hamasaki herself, while production was handled by long-time collaborator Max Matsuura. The song was composed by Dai Nagao, who used the alias D.A.I., whilst it was arranged by Nagao and Japanese musician Naoto Suzuki. It was mixed by Dave Way, and mastered by Eddy Schreyer. Musically, "To Be" is a J-Pop song, a genre that wasn't as prominent on the parent album Loveppears (1999), which heavily incorporated dance music. The song's instrumentation consists of synthesizers and keyboards by Suzuki and electric guitar by Masayoshi Furukawa, whilst programming was handled by Takahiro Iida. Lyrically, the song was written in third person perspective, a trait that is shared with the rest of the album's tracks.

"To Be" was released by Avex Trax in Japan and Taiwan on May 12, 1999, and through Avex Entertainment Inc. it was released worldwide in September 2008. The mini CD format featured a total of three tracks: the original recording, the instrumental track, and a remix by Japanese musician Izumi Miyazaki. Then on February 28, 2001, Avex Trax distributed a CD single including the three tracks from the mini CD, plus three remixes of Hamasaki's single "Fly High" and one remix for her single "Appears". As part of Avex's archive releases, an EP of the single was distributed worldwide on iTunes Store in September 2008. The artwork of the CD and digital format was shot by Toru Kumazawa, and featured an image of Hamasaki wearing a patterned dress, mirrored against each other. The CD single was marked with a special colored, this being pink.

== Reception ==
Upon its release, "To Be" received positive reviews from music critics. A staff member at Amazon.com was positive towards the "gentle", "warming", and "feminine" vibe towards the song, and praised her vocal performance. AllMusic's Alexey Eremenko, whom contributed to writing Hamasaki's biography on the website, selected the track as some of her best work. In 2015, Japanese website Goo.ne.jp hosted a 24-hour only poll for audiences in Japan to vote for their favorite single released by Hamasaki. As a result, "To Be" ranked at number five, with a rating of 46.2 average percent. Commercially, "To Be" was a success in Japan, but failed to replicate the same success as her previous single "Love (Destiny)", which reached the top spot on the Oricon Singles Chart. It debuted at number four, sold 109,860 units in its first week, and lasted 15 weeks on the chart. In a similar run, it debuted at number six on the Count Down TV chart hosted by Tokyo Broadcasting System (TBS), and lasted 15 weeks overall.

By the end of 1999, it had sold over 324,500 units in Japan, and was ranked at number 67 on Oricon's Annual 1999 chart; the single was ranked behind three of Hamasaki's other releases: "Love (Destiny)", (May 1999) "Boys & Girls" (July 1999) and her EP A (August 1999). Likewise, it ranked at number 62 on TBS' Annual Chart. In March 2000, the single was certified Platinum by the Recording Industry Association of Japan (RIAJ) for shipments of 400,000 units. As of July 2016, "To Be" is her 21 highest selling single based on Oricon Style's data base. After the CD single release, "To Be" charted at number 26 on the Oricon Singles Chart, one of the highest results from her re-released maxi CD's. It lasted for 3 weeks on the top 100, and sold 28,850 units. It reached number 27 on the TBS Count Down TV chart, and was present there for three weeks.

== Music video and promotion ==
An accompanying music video for the single was directed by Wataru Takeishi. The video opens with a title screen of the song and Hamasaki's name. It then shows a boy looking towards the camera, until shifting to Hamasaki wearing a colorful outfit whilst surrounded by star-like shapes. The boy walks through the stars whilst Hamasaki sings the song; the second look is inspired by the artwork of "To Be". He opens a case that holds a kaleidoscope and looks through it, seeing various versions of Hamasaki in different colored outfits and wigs singing the song. All these scenes start to re-appear throughout the rest of the song, and ends with a black and white image of Hamasaki, apparently cracked in the kaleidoscope, which then has the boy looking upset. The music video was included on several DVD compilations released by Hamasaki: A Clips (2000), a self-titled DVD (2000), A Complete Box Set (2004), the digital release of A Clips Complete (2014), and the DVD and Blu-Ray re-release edition of her 2001 compilation album A Best (2016).

"To Be" has been heavily promoted on compilation albums conducted by Hamasaki. It has been included on seven of Hamasaki's remix albums, including Super Eurobeat Presents Ayu-ro Mix (2000) and Ayu-mi-x II Version Non-Stop Mega Mix (2001). The acoustic orchestral version appeared on Hamasaki's 2000 single "Seasons", whilst the Hideki Hakamada remix appeared on the following single "Boys & Girls" in 1999. The single has also been featured on two of Hamasaki's greatest hits album, being A Best (2001) and A Complete: All Singles (2007). The single was re-vised twice on two special occasions; the first being her ballad compilation release A Ballads (2003), which was remastered for the album, and was re-recorded for her 10th anniversary celebration on her single "Days/Green" in 2008. It has been performed at one live event and released on live DVD by Hamasaki, this being her 2006 (Miss)Understood concert tour in Japan. In 2006, the song was covered by Chinese recording artist An Youqi, who won the Super Girl competition years prior, and was titled "Accompany Me".

== Track listing ==
- Mini CD
1. "To Be" – 5:16
2. "To Be" (Dub's Cool Wind Remix) – 5:56
3. "To Be" (Instrumental) – 5:16
- CD single
1. "To Be" – 5:16
2. "To Be" (Dub's Cool Wind Remix) – 5:56
3. "Appears" (HW Tokyo Hard House Mix) – 5:37
4. "Fly High" (Sharp Boys U.K Cocal Mix) – 4:07
5. "Fly High" (Supreme Mix) – 6:22
6. "Fly High" (Sample Madness Remix) – 5:03
7. "To Be" (Instrumental) – 5:16
- Digital download EP #1
1. "To Be" – 5:16
2. "To Be" (Dub's Cool Wind Remix) – 5:56
3. "To Be" (Instrumental) – 5:16
- Digital download EP #2
1. "To Be" – 5:16
2. "To Be" (Dub's Cool Wind Remix) – 5:56
3. "Appears" (HW Tokyo Hard House Mix) – 5:37
4. "Fly High" (Sharp Boys U.K Cocal Mix) – 4:07
5. "Fly High" (Supreme Mix) – 6:22
6. "Fly High" (Sample Madness Remix) – 5:03
7. "To Be" (Instrumental) – 5:16
- US and Canada digital download
1. "To Be" – 5:16

== Personnel ==
Credits adapted from the CD liner notes of Loveppears;

Recording

- Recorded at Prime Sound Studio, Studio Sound Dali, Onkio Haus, Tokyo, Japan in 1999.

Credits

- Ayumi Hamasaki – vocals, songwriting, background vocals
- Max Matsuura – production
- Dai Nagao – composing, arranging
- Naoto Suzuki – sound producing, synthesizers, keyboards
- Eddy Schreyer – mastering
- Masayoshi Furukawa – guitar
- Takahiro Iida – programming
- Wataru Takeishi – music video director
- Dave Way – mixing

== Charts ==
=== Weekly charts ===
Chart (1999)	Peak position
Japan Weekly Chart (Oricon)	4
Japan Weekly Count Down TV Chart (TBS)	6

Chart (2001; CD release)	Peak position
Japan Weekly Chart (Oricon)	26
Japan Weekly Count Down TV Chart (TBS)	27

=== Yearly chart ===
Chart (1999)	Peak position
Japan (Oricon)	67
Japan Count Down TV (TBS)	62

== Certification and sales ==
Region	Certification	Certified units/sales
Japan (RIAJ) Mini CD release.	Platinum	400,000^{^}
Japan CD single release.	—	28,850
^{^} Shipments figures based on certification alone.

== Release history ==
Region	Date	Format	Label
Japan	May 12, 1999	Mini CD	Avex Trax
Taiwan	May 12, 1999	Mini CD	Avex Trax
Japan	February 28, 2001; February 28, 2016	CD single	Avex Trax
Taiwan	February 28, 2001; February 28, 2016	CD single	Avex Trax
Japan	September 2008 (Note: There is currently insufficient evidence to determine what date Hamasaki's digital releases appeared on online retails. The closest source for iTunes Store evidence is at Jame World, whom confirmed Hamasaki's work was released worldwide on iTunes in September 2008.)	Digital download	Avex Trax; Avex Entertainment Inc.
Australia	September 2008	Digital download	Avex Entertainment Inc.
New Zealand	September 2008	Digital download	Avex Entertainment Inc.
United Kingdom	September 2008	Digital download	Avex Entertainment Inc.
Ireland	September 2008	Digital download	Avex Entertainment Inc.
Germany	September 2008	Digital download	Avex Entertainment Inc.
Spain	September 2008	Digital download	Avex Entertainment Inc.
France	September 2008	Digital download	Avex Entertainment Inc.
Italy	September 2008	Digital download	Avex Entertainment Inc.
Taiwan	September 2008	Digital download	Avex Entertainment Inc.
United States	September 2008	Digital download	Avex Entertainment Inc.
Canada	September 2008	Digital download	Avex Entertainment Inc.

== See also ==
- List of Oricon number-one singles of 1999
