= Love (Destiny) =

- Mini CD cover

Single by Ayumi Hamasaki

from the album Loveppears
- Released: April 14, 1999
- Recorded: 1999
- Genre: J-pop
- Length: 4:55
- Label: Avex Trax; Avex Taiwan; Avex Entertainment Inc.
- Songwriter: Ayumi Hamasaki
- Producer: Max Matsuura

Ayumi Hamasaki singles chronology
"Whatever" (1999)	"Love (Destiny)" (1999)	"To Be" (1999)

Alternative cover
- CD single artwork

Official Music Video
- "Love (Destiny)" on YouTube

"Love (Destiny)" (stylized as "LOVE ~Destiny~") is a song recorded by Japanese recording artist Ayumi Hamasaki, serving as the second single for her second studio album, Loveppears (1999). It was released by Avex Trax in Japan and Taiwan on April 14, 1999, and through Avex Entertainment Inc. worldwide in September 2008. The track was written by Hamasaki herself, while production was handled by long-time collaborator Max Matsuura. Three versions of the recording have been made available—a ballad version arranged by Tsunku, an edited version with vocals by Tsunku, and a dance-influenced version included on Loveppears.

Upon its release, "Love (Destiny)" received near universal acclaim from music critics, praising her vocal performance, with some highlighting the single as one of Hamasaki's best work. Commercially, the recording experienced success in Japan, reaching number one on the Oricon Singles Chart and TBS' Count Down TV chart, her first song to do so on either charts. It also became Hamasaki's first single to sell over 500,000 units, and was certified Platinum by the Recording Industry Association of Japan (RIAJ) for shipments of 400,000 copies. Due to the single's success, it was re-released as a CD single and re-entered both charts.

An accompanying music video was directed by Wataru Takeishi, and featured Hamasaki in a large skyscraper while singing to the song in different areas. In order to promote the single, it appeared on several remix and greatest hits compilation albums, and live concert torus conducted by Hamasaki. It was also used as the theme song for Japanese television show SemiDouble (1999). To date, the recording remains one of her highest-selling singles according to Oricon Style.

== Background ==
=== Versions and composition ===
Three versions of the recording have been made available for purchase. "Love (Destiny)" initially served as Hamasaki's second single for her album Loveppears but did not appear on the album for unknown reasons. Written by the singer, the production process was handled by Max Matsuura whilst it was composed by Japanese musician and businessman Tsunku, who worked as the producer for Japanese group Morning Musume and vocalist of Sharan Q at that time. The composition was then arranged by Shingo Kobayashi and Yasuaki Maejima, and mixed by Atsushi Hattori. The second version, "Love (Since 1999)", portrayed a duet with Tsunku and featured songwriting credits by him during the English chorus. Being arranged by Takao Konishi and mixed by Koji Uchikado, the track appeared as an A-side single in Japan and Taiwan during its April 1999 release.

The final counterpart of the recording was titled "Love (Refrain)", and was similarly composed by Tsunku, but arranged by Naoto Suzuki and programmed by Takahiro Iida. "Love (Refrain)" was added to the track list of Loveppears, and is musically a dance song, a genre that heavily influences the album. According to the demo sheet music published at Ultimate Guitar Archive, the recording is set in time signature of common time with a tempo of 89 beats per minute. Lyrically, each song was written in third person perspective, a trait that is shared with the rest of the tracks on Loveppears. The lyrical content of the songs delves on a lonely woman who wants to find love.

=== Release and formats ===
"Love (Destiny)" was released by Avex Trax in Japan and Taiwan on April 14, 1999, and through Avex Entertainment Inc. worldwide in September 2008. The mini CD format featured a total of four tracks, with the first two being original recordings accompanied instrumentals. Subsequently, on February 28, 2001, Avex Trax distributed a CD single including the four tracks from the mini CD, plus two remixes of Hamasaki's single "Kanariya" (1999) and one remix of a previous album track, "From Your Letter". The artwork of the CD and digital format was shot by Toru Kumazawa, and featured an image of Hamasaki hugging an unidentified male.

== Reception ==
Upon its release, "Love (Destiny)" received widespread acclaim from music critics. A reviewer at Amazon was positive towards the songwriting, and praised Hamasaki's "painful" and "love[ly]" performance. In 2015, Japanese website Goo.ne.jp hosted a 24-hour only poll for audiences in Japan to vote for their favorite single released by Hamasaki; as a result, "Love (Destiny)" ranked at number six, with a rating of 43.9 average percent. Commercially, "Love (Destiny)" experienced success in Japan. It debuted inside the top ten on the Oricon Singles Chart, selling 70,540 in its first week of availability. The recording then went to number one, becoming Hamasaki's first number one single on that chart. It lasted 26 weeks, marking the singer's longest-charting release. Charting together as "Love (Destiny)"/"Love (Since 1999)", both tracks debuted at number one on the Count Down TV chart hosted by Tokyo Broadcasting System (TBS), having become her first number one there as well, and similarly spent 26 weeks within the top 100.

By the end of 1999, "Love (Destiny)" sold over 650,790 units in Japan, thus being ranked at number 30 on Oricon's Annual 1999 chart behind two fellow releases of the singer, "Boys & Girls" (1999) and her extended play A (1999). Likewise, it charted at number 28 on TBS' Annual Chart. In July 1999, the single was certified Platinum by the Recording Industry Association of Japan (RIAJ) for shipments of 400,000 units. As of July 2016, "Love (Destiny)" marks the singer's 12th highest-selling song based on Oricon Style's database. Following the CD single release, "Love (Destiny)" charted at number 20 on the Oricon Singles Chart, the highest result from her re-released maxi CDs. It lasted four weeks within the top 100, and sold 39,080 units. Additionally, the song reached number 100 on TBS Count Down TV chart on May 14, 2001, her lowest entry to date.

== Music video and promotion ==
An accompanying music video for the single was directed by Wataru Takeishi. It opens with Hamasaki watching her previous music videos on several television screens. Sitting in a small room, she exits it and finds a large number of fans and paparazzi bombarding her; scenes interspersed through the main plot feature her looking towards a mirror. Following the first chorus, Hamasaki is shown riding through Tokyo city, including her appearance at a recording studio singing the song, and on top of a skyscraper at night. The frames subsequently re-appear throughout the visual, with it ending with a blurry shot of Hamasaki looking away from the mirror, and the TV screens from the first shot displaying the logo of Avex Trax. The music video was included on several DVD compilations released by Hamasaki: A Clips (2000), A Complete Box Set (2004), the digital release of A Clips Complete (2014), and the DVD and Blu-Ray re-release edition of her 2001 compilation album A Best (2016). It was additionally used as the theme for Japanese television show Semi Double (1999).

"Love (Destiny)" has been heavily promoted on compilation albums conducted by Hamasaki. It has been included on one of the singer's remix compilation album, Ayu-mi-x 7 Version Acoustic Orchestra (2012). A remix produced by Todd Okawa appeared on the maxi CD for her single "Boys & Girls", and it was re-recorded for her 10th anniversary in 2008 on her single release "Days/Green". The single has also been featured on two of Hamasaki's greatest hits albums, A Best (2001), and A Complete: All Singles (2007). "Love (Destiny)" has further been included on one of the singer's major concert tours, part one and part two of her 2000 concert tour.

== Track listings ==
- Mini CD
1. "Love (Destiny)" – 4:55
2. "Love (Since 1999)" – 4:39
3. "Love (Destiny)" (instrumental) – 4:55
4. "Love (Since 1999)" (instrumental) – 4:39
- CD single
1. "Love (Destiny)" – 4:55
2. "Love (Since 1999)" – 4:39
3. "Kanariya" (Big Room mix) – 7:34
4. "Kanariya" (H∧L's mix) – 4:22
5. "From Your Letter" (Pandart Sasanooha mix) – 5:41
6. "Love (Destiny)" (instrumental) – 4:55
7. "Love (Since 1999)" (instrumental) – 4:39
- Digital download EP #1
1. "Love (Destiny)" – 4:55
2. "Love (Since 1999)" – 4:39
3. "Love (Destiny)" (instrumental) – 4:55
4. "Love (Since 1999)" (instrumental) – 4:39
- Digital download EP #2
1. "Love (Destiny)" – 4:55
2. "Love (Since 1999)" – 4:39
3. "Kanariya" (Big Room Mix) – 7:34
4. "Kanariya" (H∧L's Mix) – 4:22
5. "From Your Letter" (Pandart Sasanooha Mix) – 5:41
6. "Love (Destiny)" (instrumental) – 4:55
7. "Love (Since 1999)" (instrumental) – 4:39
- US and Canada digital download
1. "Love (Destiny)" – 4:55
2. "Love (Since 1999)" – 4:39

== Charts ==
=== Weekly charts ===
Chart (1999)	Peak position
Japan (Oricon)	1
Japan (Count Down TV)	1

Chart (2001; CD release)	Peak position
Japan (Oricon)	20
Japan (Count Down TV)	100

=== Yearly charts ===
Chart (1999)	Peak position
Japan (Oricon)	30
Japan Count Down TV (TBS)	28

== Certification and sales ==
Region	Certification	Certified units/sales
Japan (RIAJ)	Platinum	689,870

== Release history ==
Region	Date	Format	Label
Japan	April 14, 1999	Mini CD	Avex Trax
Taiwan	April 14, 1999	Mini CD	Avex Trax
Japan	February 28, 2001; February 28, 2016	CD single	Avex Trax
Taiwan	February 28, 2001; February 28, 2016	CD single	Avex Trax
Japan	September 2008 (Note: There is currently insufficient evidence to determine what date Hamasaki's digital releases appeared on online retails. The closest source for an iTunes Store evidence is at Jame World, who confirmed Hamasaki's work was released worldwide on iTunes in September 2008.)	Digital download	Avex Trax; Avex Entertainment Inc.
Australia	September 2008	Digital download	Avex Entertainment Inc.
New Zealand	September 2008	Digital download	Avex Entertainment Inc.
United Kingdom	September 2008	Digital download	Avex Entertainment Inc.
Ireland	September 2008	Digital download	Avex Entertainment Inc.
Germany	September 2008	Digital download	Avex Entertainment Inc.
Spain	September 2008	Digital download	Avex Entertainment Inc.
France	September 2008	Digital download	Avex Entertainment Inc.
Italy	September 2008	Digital download	Avex Entertainment Inc.
Taiwan	September 2008	Digital download	Avex Entertainment Inc.
United States	September 2008	Digital download	Avex Entertainment Inc.
Canada	September 2008	Digital download	Avex Entertainment Inc.

== See also ==
- List of Oricon number-one singles of 1999
