= Kanariya =

Single by Ayumi Hamasaki

from the album Loveppears
- Released: December 8, 1999
- Recorded: 1999
- Genre: Trip hop (original album version) House · Rave (Jonathan Peters remix)
- Length: 4:44 (Radio edit); 3:04 (Album edit)
- Label: Avex Trax; Avex USA; Avex Entertainment Inc.
- Songwriter: Ayumi Hamasaki
- Producer: Max Matsuura

Ayumi Hamasaki singles chronology
"Appears" (1999)	"Kanariya" (1999)	"Fly High" (2000)

Official Music Video
- "Kanariya" on YouTube

"Kanariya" (Japanese: "Canary") is a song recorded by Japanese recording artist Ayumi Hamasaki for her second studio album, Loveppears (1999). It was released by Avex Trax in Japan and Hong Kong on December 8, 1999, and through Avex USA in North America in early 2000. The recording also served as Hamasaki's second limited-edition single, with limited physical units of 300,000 copies. The track was written by Hamasaki herself, while production was handled by long-time collaborator Max Matsuura. Two versions of "Kanariya" were made available for consumption—a radio edit produced by American disc jockey Jonathan Peters, and the album version composed by Yasuhiko Hoshino. Lyrically, the song was written in third person perspective.

Upon its release, "Kanariya" received mixed reviews from music critics, with some of them praising the original and radio edit, but generally criticizing the remixes. Commercially, the single experienced success in Japan, peaking at number one on the Oricon Singles Chart and TBS' Count Down TV chart. It sold just below its 300,000 restricted copies, and was certified Gold by the Recording Industry Association of Japan (RIAJ) for shipments of 200,000 units. An accompanying music video for the recording was directed by Wataru Takeishi, with it portraying Hamasaki in a dark laboratory surrounded by keyboards and electronic devices. To promote the single, it appeared on several remix and greatest hits compilation albums released by Hamasaki.

== Background and release ==
"Kanariya" was written by Hamasaki herself, while production was handled by long-time collaborator Max Matsuura. Two versions of "Kanariya" were made available for consumption—a radio edit produced by disc jockey Jonathan Peters, and the album version composed by Yasuhiko Hoshino. Peters' remix of the track portrays a dance composition, a genre that heavily influenced Hamasaki's second studio album, Loveppears (1999). The song also includes musical elements of house and techno. "Kanariya"'s instrumentation consists of synthesizers and keyboards played by Peters; it was eventually mastered and co-produced by Japanese musician Naoto Suzuki. The track's album version was included as a hidden track with another album entry, "Who...", and has been described by members of CD Journal as a pop recording with instrumentation of guitars and a drum kit. Lyrically, the recording was written in third person perspective, a trait that is shared with the rest of the album's tracks.

The song was released by Avex Trax in Japan and Hong Kong on December 8, 1999, as a CD single, serving as Hamasaki's second limited-edition single with limited physical units of 300,000 copies. The physical format of "Karariya" featured a total of thirteen tracks, of which eleven were remixes and an a cappella of the track, also incorporating a remix for Hamasaki's tracks "Two of Us" and "From Your Letter". While the former appeared on her debut studio album, A Song for ×× (1999), the latter was included as a B-side track for her single "Depend on You". On June 12, 2000, "Kanariya" was distributed in North America through Avex USA as a 12" inch vinyl, including three remixes managed by Peters. The single's artwork was photographed by Japanese photographer Toru Kumazawa, and featured Hamasaki sitting in a circular pod with rhinestones on her face. The physical version of "Kanariya" failed to include a booklet, which resulted in the cover sleeve being immolated as a picture disc, featuring an emphasised plastic sheet with information on the single.

== Reception ==
Upon its release, "Kanariya" received mixed reviews from music critics. A reviewer from Jame World was generally favourable to the album version of the song, acclaiming the R&B approach and Hamasaki's vocal abilities. When reviewing the CD single, the website stated, "For fans of remixes, it is a great release – however, if you want substantial music with variety and professionalism, you should look elsewhere." Similarly, a member of CD Journal was positive towards the original and radio edit of the single, but criticized the remixes and labelled the sound "tired". Commercially, the single experienced success in Japan. It debuted at number one on the Oricon Singles Chart, selling 248,070 units in its first week of availability. "Kanariya" lasted six weeks within the top 200, marking one of Hamasaki's lowest-spanning singles on that chart. Likewise, it opened atop on the Count Down TV chart hosted by Tokyo Broadcasting System (TBS), lasting four weeks within the top 100.

By the end of 1999, the recording sold over 289,200 units in Japan, but failed to be included on Oricon's Annual Chart for unknown reasons. The subsequent year, "Kanariya" was ranked at number 92 behind five other singles released by Hamasaki. It also peaked at number 84 on TBS' Annual Chart in 1999. In February 2000, the track was certified Gold by the Recording Industry Association of Japan (RIAJ) for shipments of 200,000 units. As of July 2016, "Kanariya" has been listed as the singer's 29th best-selling single based on Oricon Style's database.

== Music video and promotion ==
An accompanying music video for the single was directed by Wataru Takeishi, and uses a shorten version of Peters' remix. The visual portrays Hamasaki in a dark laboratory, being surrounded by keyboards, electronic devices and a black bird. Throughout the music video, several people start to wear headphones and follow Hamasaki, with them eventually starting to listen to the song and observing TV monitors of the singer. Each person, including Hamasaki, wears black eye shadow on one eye, and a code on their hand. Over the clip, the singer is seen singing to the recording in the laboratory, with interspersed scenes portraying her wearing the outfit used for the single's artwork. The music video was included on several DVD compilations released by Hamasaki, includingA Clips (2000), A Complete Box Set (2004), and the digital release of A Clips Complete (2014).

"Kanariya" has been heavily promoted through compilation albums released by Hamasaki, being additionally included on six of her remix albums, including Super Eurobeat Presents Ayu-ro Mix and Ayu-mi-x II Version Non-Stop Mega Mix (2001). The single has also been featured on A Complete: All Singles (2007), one of the singer's greatest hits album, and was specially remixed by Hex Hector for addition on her extended play The Other Side One: Hex Hector (2001).

== Track listing ==
- CD single & Digital download
1. "Kanariya" (Jonathan Peters' Vocal Club Mix) – 9:58
2. "Kanariya" (Struggle Mix) – 6:03
3. "Kanariya" (Hal's Mix) – 4:22
4. "Kanariya" (DJ-Turbo Club Mix) – 7:10
5. "Kanariya" (Dub's Energy Remix) – 7:31
6. "Two of Us" (Hal's Mix) – 5:17
7. "Kanariya" (Spazm Mix) – 6:22
8. "From Your Letter" (Pandart Sasanooha mix) – 5:41
9. "Kanariya" (Big Room Mix) – 7:35
10. "Kanariya" (Hiroshi's Nite Clubbing Mix) – 5:15
11. "Kanariya" (Full Vocal Mix) – 6:45
12. "Kanariya" (Original Mix) [Radio edit] – 3:03
13. "Kanariya" (Vocal Track) – 3:03
- US 12" vinyl
1. "Kanariya" (Jonathan Peters' Vocal Club Mix) – 9:58
2. "Kanariya" (Jonathan Peters' Millennium Dub) – 9:41
3. "Kanariya" (Jonathan Peters' Sound Factory Dub) – 9:41

== Credit and personnel ==
Credits adapted from the liner notes of the single's physical release.

Recording

- Recorded at Prime Sound Studio, Studio Sound Dali, Onkio Haus, Tokyo, Japan in 1999.

Credits

- Ayumi Hamasaki – vocals, songwriting, background vocals
- Max Matsuura – production
- Yasuhiko Hoshino – composing, programming
- CPM-Marvin – arranging
- Naoto Suzuki – sound producing
- Wataru Takeishi – music video director
- Jonathan Peters – co-producing, remixing
- Dave Way – mixing

== Charts ==
=== Weekly ===
Chart (1999)	Peak position
Japan (Oricon)	1
Japan (Count Down TV)	1

=== Year-end chart ===
Chart (1999–2000)	Peak position
Japan Count Down TV	89
Japan (Oricon)	92

== Certification and sales ==
Region	Certification	Certified units/sales
Japan (RIAJ)	Gold	289,200

== Release history ==
Region	Date	Format	Label
Japan	December 8, 1999	CD single	Avex Trax; Avex Entertainment Inc.
Hong Kong	December 8, 1999	CD single	Avex Trax; Avex Entertainment Inc.
North America	June 12, 2000	12" vinyl	Avex USA
Japan	September 2008 (Note: There is insufficient evidence to determine what date Hamasaki's digital releases appeared on online retails. The closest source for an iTunes Store availability is provided by Jame World, who confirmed Hamasaki's work was released in September 2008.)	Digital download	Avex Trax; Avex Entertainment Inc.
Australia	September 2008	Digital download	Avex Entertainment Inc.
New Zealand	September 2008	Digital download	Avex Entertainment Inc.
United Kingdom	September 2008	Digital download	Avex Entertainment Inc.
Ireland	September 2008	Digital download	Avex Entertainment Inc.
Germany	September 2008	Digital download	Avex Entertainment Inc.
Spain	September 2008	Digital download	Avex Entertainment Inc.
France	September 2008	Digital download	Avex Entertainment Inc.
Italy	September 2008	Digital download	Avex Entertainment Inc.
Taiwan	September 2008	Digital download	Avex Entertainment Inc.
