= A Complete: All Singles =

- Standard cover.

Greatest hits album by Ayumi Hamasaki
- Released: September 10, 2008
- Recorded: 1998–2008
- Genre: J-pop
- Label: Avex Trax
- Producer: Max Matsuura

Ayumi Hamasaki chronology
Guilty (2008)	A Complete: All Singles (2008)	Next Level (2009)

Alternative cover
- 3CD+DVD edition

Singles from A Complete: All Singles
- 1. "Mirrorcle World" Released: April 8, 2008

A Complete: All Singles is a greatest hits album by Japanese singer Ayumi Hamasaki. Avex Trax released it on September 10, 2008 in a variety of formats, and was created to commemorate the singer's tenth anniversary since the release of her 1998 single "Poker Face". The album is divided into three sections, each highlighting a single released by Hamasaki from her debut in 1998 to her most recent single, "Talkin' 2 Myself" in 2007. Additionally, the compilation includes two new songs: the stand-alone single "Mirrorcle World" and a re-recorded version of "Who...".

A Complete: All Singles was appreciated by Japanese music publication CDJournal for highlighting Hamasaki’s music catalogue. It debuted at the top of the Oricon Albums Chart and spent more than 200 weeks on the Oricon Digital chart. The Recording Industry Association of Japan (RIAJ) certified the album triple platinum for exceeding shipments of 750,000 units, and gold for digital sales of 100,000 copies. Hamasaki promoted the album through her annual Countdown Live show and her 10th Anniversary concert tour, which travelled between Japan, Hong Kong and China. Both shows had live DVD releases.

== Background and content ==
Hamasaki announced on her website in July 2008 that she would be releasing her greatest hits album, A Complete: All Singles. It is her second compilation album to include all singles from her entire discography up to her most recent single, "Talkin' 2 Myself," the first being her A Best album from 2001. It is also her fifth compilation release, following A Best (2001), A Ballads (2003), and the double album A Best 2 (2007). She later published additional information about both albums, including the album's content, formats, and promotional activities.

The compilation was created to mark the singer's tenth anniversary since the release of her 1998 single "Poker Face". Shigeo Miyamoto remastered all of the songs on A Complete: All Singles, and was produced by primary collaborator Max Matsuura. The album is divided into three parts, with a total of 44 songs arranged chronologically from the release date of each single. The third disc features two new tracks: "Mirrorcle World," a reworked version of the album interlude "Mirror" from Guilty (2008), and a new recording of her song "Who..." from Loveppears (1999). The Chinese-language version of "Who..." was also included in Chinese editions of the album.

== Release ==
A Complete: All Singles was released on various formats on September 10, 2008 by Avex Trax. The standard release included three discs of material and came in a large jewelcase. The DVD version included songs from the album performed at a limited-capacity TA Live show at Zepp Tokyo on May 27, 2003. The DVD includes a variety of live performances from Hamasaki's appearance at A-Nation, as well as live tracks that were not included in the compilation. Furthermore, first-press editions of both formats came in a boxset with a forty-eight-page photobook featuring previously unreleased alternate artworks for each single. Avex Trax later released A Complete: All Singles on triple-CD and DVD formats across Asia, including Hong Kong, Taiwan, and China.

== Promotion ==
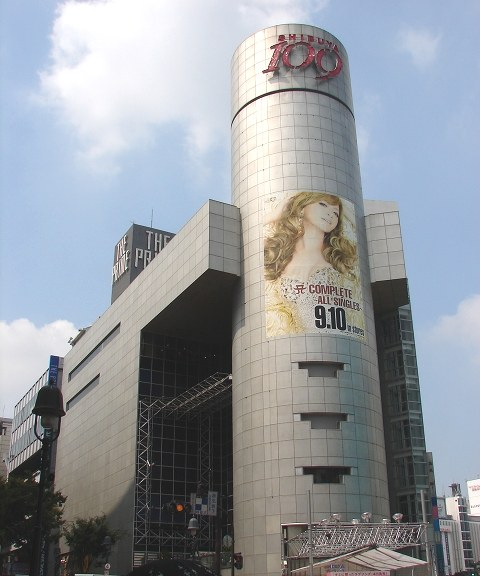
A Complete ~All Singles~ being promoted on Shibuya 109.

Avex Trax released "Mirrorcle World" as the album's standalone single on April 8, 2008. Its release commemorates Hamasaki's tenth career anniversary and the release date of her first single, "Poker Face". The single also includes a re-recording of her song "Depend on You" and a B-side track called "Life". The DVD versions of the single included a music video featuring the singer dressed in various outfits while walking through Paris, France. Commercially, it debuted at the top of the Oricon Singles Chart, was certified Platinum by the Recording Industry Association of Japan (RIAJ) for physical sales of over 250,000 units, and certified gold for digital sales of over 100,000 units.

The re-recorded version of "Who..." was released as a promotional single in Japan. It peaked at number 49 on Billboard Japan's Adult Alternative Airplay chart in 2008, and was the 18th most downloaded ringtone in October 2008, according to RIAJ. It was later certified platinum by the RIAJ after exceeding 250,000 digital downloads.

Hamasaki embarked on two separate concert tours to promote A Complete: All Singles. Her first was a 32-date concert tour of Japan, China, and Hong Kong to commemorate her 10th anniversary. The tour began on April 5, 2008 and ended on November 2, the same year. A live DVD of the tour was released on January 28, 2009. A second tour was her annual Countdown Live show, which was held on December 30 and 31, 2008, at the Yoyogi National Stadium. Avex Trax distributed a live DVD on May 13, 2009.

== Reception ==
Professional ratings
Review scores
Source	Rating
CDJournal	(positive)

CDJournal, a Japanese music publication, praised A Complete: All Singles for highlighting Hamasaki's career over three discs, calling the affair "surprising." The album won two awards: Best Album of 2008 at the French J-Awards and one of the top ten best albums at the Japan Gold Disc Awards ceremony in 2009.

A Complete: All Singles was commercially successful in Japan. The album debuted at the top of the Oricon Daily and Weekly Album Charts, selling 538,876 copies in its first week and becoming her fourth number-one compilation. Moreover, the album opened at number one on the Billboard Japan Top Album Sales chart. By the end of 2008, it ranked eighth on the Oricon Year-end Chart, having sold 815,643 units. The Recording Industry Association of Japan (RIAJ) certified the album triple platinum for sales exceeding 750,000 units in September 2008. By September 2011, Oricon stated that the album sold 853,000 physical copies in the region.

After Oricon began tracking digital downloads in November 2016, A Complete: All Singles peaked at number one on the Digital Albums Chart and has spent over 200 weeks on there. On January 25, 2021, the album reached 19th place in the weekly charts, becoming a long-running hit. On September 13, 2022, it was featured on dMusic's "Long-running hit albums that boast unwavering popularity." The album was later certified gold by the RIAJ for exceeding 100,000 digital sales.

== Track listing ==
All lyrics are written by Ayumi Hamasaki.

CD 1
No.	Title	Music	Arranger(s)	Length
1.	"Poker Face"	Yasuhiko Hoshino	Akimitsu Honma	4:46
2.	"You"	Hoshino	Honma	4:48
3.	"Trust"	Takashi Kimura	Honma, Kimura	4:54
4.	"For My Dear..."	Hoshino	Hoshino	4:36
5.	"Depend on You"	Kazuhito Kkuchi	Honma, Takashi Morio	4:23
6.	"Whatever"	Kikuchi	Izumi Miyazaki	5:35
7.	"Love (Destiny)"	Tsunku	Shingo Kobayashi, Yasuaki Maejima	5:00
8.	"To Be"	D.A.I.	D.A.I., Naoto Suzuki	5:22
9.	"Boys & Girls"	D.A.I.	D.A.I., Suzuki	3:58
10.	"Monochrome"	D.A.I.	D.A.I., Suzuki	4:34
11.	"Appears"	Kikuchi	HΛL	5:41
12.	"Kanariya"	Hoshino	CPM-Marvin	3:09
13.	"Fly High"	D.A.I.	HΛL	4:10
14.	"Vogue"	Kikuchi	Kikuchi, Suzuki	4:30
15.	"Far Away"	D.A.I., Kikuchi	HΛL	5:34

CD 2
No.	Title	Music	Arranger(s)	Length
1.	"Seasons"	D.A.I.	Suzuki	4:25
2.	"Surreal"	Kikuchi	HΛL	4:44
3.	"Audience"	D.A.I.	HΛL	4:10
4.	"M"	Hamasaki	HΛL	4:31
5.	"Evolution"	Hamasaki	HΛL	4:46
6.	"Never Ever"	Hamasaki	Chokkaku	4:44
7.	"Endless Sorrow"	Hamasaki	CMJK, Junichi Matsuda	5:30
8.	"Unite!"	Hamasaki	HΛL	5:04
9.	"Dearest"	Hamasaki, D.A.I.	Suzuki	5:37
10.	"Daybreak"	Hamasaki, D.A.I., Matsuda	Tasuku	4:52
11.	"Free & Easy"	Hamasaki, D.A.I.	HΛL	5:03
12.	"Independent"	Hamasaki, D.A.I.	Tasuku	4:59
13.	"Voyage"	Hamasaki, D.A.I.	Ken Shima	5:11
14.	"Ourselves"	Bounceback	CMJK	4:57
15.	"Forgiveness"	Hamasaki, D.A.I.	CMJK	5:34

CD 3
No.	Title	Music	Arranger(s)	Length
1.	"No Way to Say"	Bounceback	HΛL	4:45
2.	"Moments"	Tetsuya Yukumi	Hikari	5:33
3.	"Inspire"	Yukumi	HΛL	4:36
4.	"Carols"	Tomoya Kinoshita	CMJK	5:32
5.	"Step You"	Kazuhiro Hara	CMJK	4:28
6.	"Fairyland"	Tasuku	HΛL	5:21
7.	"Heaven"	Kikuchi	Yuta Nakano, KZB	4:22
8.	"Bold & Delicious"	Geo of Sweetbox	CMJK	4:44
9.	"Startin'"	Hara	CMJK	4:21
10.	"Blue Bird"	D.A.I.	HΛL	4:11
11.	"Glitter"	Hara	HΛL	4:54
12.	"Talkin' 2 Myself"	Nakano	HΛL	4:56
13.	"Mirrorcle World"	Nakano	Nakano	5:22

Japanese bonus track
No.	Title	Music	Arranger(s)	Length
14.	"Who..." (10th Anniversary version)	Kikuchi	Suzuki	5:37

Chinese bonus track
No.	Title	Music	Arranger(s)	Length
14.	"Who..." (Chinese version)	Kikuchi	Suzuki	5:37

DVD
No.	Title	Length
1.	"Real Me" (Limited TA Live Tour – Zepp Tokyo, May 27, 2003)
2.	"Poker Face" (Limited TA Live Tour – Zepp Tokyo, May 27, 2003)
3.	"Depend on You" (Limited TA Live Tour – Zepp Tokyo, May 27, 2003)
4.	"To Be" (Limited TA Live Tour – Zepp Tokyo, May 27, 2003)
5.	"You" (Limited TA Live Tour – Zepp Tokyo, May 27, 2003)
6.	"Dolls" (Limited TA Live Tour – Zepp Tokyo, May 27, 2003)
7.	"A Song for ××" (Limited TA Live Tour – Zepp Tokyo, May 27, 2003)
8.	"Surreal" (Limited TA Live Tour – Zepp Tokyo, May 27, 2003)
9.	"Evolution" (Limited TA Live Tour – Zepp Tokyo, May 27, 2003)
10.	"Rainbow" (Limited TA Live Tour – Zepp Tokyo, May 27, 2003)
11.	"Evolution" (A-Nation '02 – Odaiba, September 1, 2002)
12.	"Hanabi" (A-Nation '02 – Odaiba, September 1, 2002)
13.	"Voyage" (A-Nation '02 – Odaiba, September 1, 2002)
14.	"Forgiveness" (A-Nation '03 – Odaiba, August 31, 2003)
15.	"Boys & Girls" (A-Nation '03 – Odaiba, August 31, 2003)
16.	"Game" (A-Nation '04 – Showa Memorial Park, August 29, 2004)
17.	"Moments" (A-Nation '04 – Showa Memorial Park, August 29, 2004)
18.	"Greatful days" (A-Nation '04 – Showa Memorial Park, August 29, 2004)
19.	"Fairyland" (A-Nation '05 – Ajinomoto Stadium, August 21, 2005)
20.	"Is This Love?" (A-Nation '05 – Ajinomoto Stadium, August 21, 2005)
21.	"Unite!" (A-Nation '06 – Ajinomoto Stadium, August 27, 2006)
22.	"A Song for ××" (A-Nation '06 – Ajinomoto Stadium, August 27, 2006)
23.	"Until That Day..." (A-Nation '07 – Ajinomoto Stadium, August 26, 2007)
24.	"July 1st" (A-Nation '07 – Ajinomoto Stadium, August 26, 2007)
25.	"Boys & Girls" (A-Nation '07 – Ajinomoto Stadium, August 26, 2007)

== Charts ==
=== Weekly chart ===
Chart (2008)	Peak position
Japanese Albums (Billboard Japan)	1
Japanese Albums (Oricon)	1
Taiwanese Albums (G-Music)	2

=== Monthly charts ===
Chart (2008)	Peak position
Japanese Albums (Oricon)	1

=== Yearly chart ===
Chart (2008)	Position
Japanese Albums (Oricon)	8

== Certification and sales ==
Region	Certification	Certified units/sales
Japan (RIAJ) Physical	3× Platinum	855,518
Japan (RIAJ) Digital	Gold	114,216

== Release history ==
Region	Date	Format(s)	Label	Ref.
Japan	September 10, 2008	CD; DVD	Avex Trax	
China	September 19, 2008	CD; DVD	Avex Trax	
Taiwan	September 19, 2008	CD; DVD	Avex Trax	
Hong Kong	October 15, 2008	CD; DVD	Avex Trax	
Various	2008	Digital download; streaming	Avex Trax	

== See also ==
- List of Oricon number-one albums of 2008
