= Fly High (Ayumi Hamasaki song) =

- CD is packaged in a red jewel case.

Single by Ayumi Hamasaki

from the album Loveppears
- Released: February 9, 2000
- Recorded: 1999
- Genre: Progressive Trance; J-pop
- Length: 4:14 (radio edit); 4:07 (album edit)
- Label: Avex Trax; Avex Entertainment Inc.
- Songwriter: Ayumi Hamasaki
- Producer: Max Matsuura

Ayumi Hamasaki singles chronology
"Kanariya" (1999)	"Fly High" (2000)	"Vogue" (2000)

Official Music Video
- "Fly High" on YouTube

"Fly High" is a song recorded by Japanese recording artist Ayumi Hamasaki. It was released by Avex Trax in Japan on February 9, 2000, and through Avex Entertainment Inc. worldwide in September 2008. The recording served as Hamasaki's third and final limited-edition single from her second studio album, Loveppears (1999), limiting physical units to 300,000 copies. The track was written by the singer herself, while production was handled by long-time collaborator Max Matsuura. Two versions of "Fly High" were made available for consumption—a radio edit composed by HΛL, and the album version produced by Dai Nagao. Lyrically, the song was written in third person perspective.

Upon its release, "Fly High" received mixed reviews from music critics. Some praised the original and radio edit, while generally criticizing the amount of remixes. Commercially, the single experienced success in Japan, peaking at number three on the Oricon Singles Chart and TBS' Count Down TV chart. It sold just below its restricted 300,000 units, and was certified Gold by the Recording Industry Association of Japan (RIAJ) for shipments of 200,000 copies. An accompanying music video for "Fly High" was directed by Wataru Takeishi, and portrayed Hamasaki in a nightclub, with a clone of her standing in the distance. To promote the single, it appeared on several remix and greatest hits compilation albums released by Hamasaki.

== Background and release ==
"Fly High" was written by Hamasaki herself, while production was handled by long-time collaborator Max Matsuura. Two versions of "Fly High" were made available for consumption—a radio edit composed by HΛL, and the album version produced by Dai Nagao. Both compositions are inspired by dance music, a genre that heavily influences Hamasaki's second studio album, Loveppears (1999), and also includes musical elements of house and techno. The song's instrumentation consists of synthesizers and keyboards managed by HΛL, while also incorporating an electric guitar provided by Naoya Akimoto. "Fly High" was eventually mastered and co-produced by Japanese musician Naoto Suzuki and Nagao. The album version is used as a lead-on for the titular opening song of Lovepperars. Lyrically, "Fly High" was written in third person perspective, a trait that is shared with the rest of the album's tracks.

It was released by Avex Trax in Japan on February 9, 2000, marking her first single in the 2000s decade, and through Avex Entertainment Inc. worldwide in September 2008. It also served as Hamasaki's third and final limited-edition single from Loveppears, limiting physical units to 300,000 copies. Subsequently, in mid 2000, a limited 12" vinyl was issued through Avex Trax in Japan to promote her second part of her 2000 concert tour. A picture disc that featured a shot of Hamasaki in a leather pink jacket included HΛL's 2000 remix on side one, and an orchestral version of the recording on side two. The artwork was photographed by Japanese photographer Toru Kumazawa, and featured Hamasaki sitting in a beige–colored circular pod with fabric around her. The physical version of "Fly High" failed to include a booklet, which resulted in the cover sleeve being immolated as a picture disc, featuring an emphasised plastic sheet with information on the single.

== Reception ==
Upon its release, "Fly High" received mixed reviews from music critics. A reviewer from CD Journal was particularly negative towards the amount of remixes on the maxi single and the lack of recognisable disc jockeys on the tracks. AllMusic's Alexey Eremenko, who contributed in writing Hamasaki's biography on the website, selected the track as one of her best works. Commercially, the single experienced success in Japan. It debuted at number three on the Oricon Singles Chart, selling 260,460 units in its first week of availability. "Fly High" lasted four weeks within the top 200, marking one of the singer's lowest-spanning singles in that chart. Likewise, it debuted at number three on the Count Down TV chart hosted by Tokyo Broadcasting System (TBS), being present for six editions within the top 100 positions.

By the end of 2000, the recording had sold over 299,540 units in Japan, and was ranked at number 89 on Oricon's Annual 2000 chart, behind four other songs by Hamasaki. Similarly, it charted at number 94 on TBS' Year-End Chart. In April 2000, "Fly High" was certified Gold by the Recording Industry Association of Japan (RIAJ) for shipments of 200,000 copies. As of July 2016, the track is her 26th highest-selling single based on Oricon Style's database.

== Music video and promotion ==
An accompanying music video for the single was directed by Wataru Takeishi, and uses HΛL's remix version. The video opens with Hamasaki signing the track in front of an audience, whilst dancing around a large black platform accompanied by her background band. Several scenes portray the video being projected on a large television screen, with the ending chorus having a clone of Hamasaki walking into the club and observing herself performing on stage. The music video was included on several DVD compilations released by Hamasaki: A Clips (2000), A Complete Box Set (2004), the digital release of A Clips Complete (2014), and the DVD and Blu-Ray re-release edition of her 2001 compilation album, A Best.

"Fly High" has been heavily promoted through compilation albums conducted by Hamasaki; it has been included on 11 of the singer's remix albums, including Super Eurobeat Presents Ayu-ro Mix and Ayu-mi-x II Version Non-Stop Mega Mix (2000). The single has also been featured on two of Hamasaki's greatest hits albums,A Best (2001) and A Complete: All Singles (2008). Additionally, it was specially remixed by Vincent De Moor for being added to the track list of her remix extended play, The Other Side Four: System F, Vincent De Moor (2001).

== Track listing ==
- CD single
1. "Fly High" (Hal's mix 2000) – 4:14
2. "Fly High" (Sample Madness remix) – 5:06
3. "Fly High" (Supreme mix) – 6:25
4. "Fly High" (acoustic orchestra version) – 4:04
5. "Fly High" (Sharp Boys U.K. vocal mix) – 4:14
6. "Fly High" (Saturation remix) – 3:55
7. "Appears" (HW club mix) – 5:26
8. "Fly High" (Dub's F remix) – 10:43
9. "Fly High" (non-stop mix N.S dance mega mix) – 12:52
10. "Kanariya" (fake compilation) – 5:11
11. "Fly High" (album version instrumental) – 4:10
12. "Fly High" (vocal track) – 3:20
- Digital download
1. "Fly High" (Hal's Mix 2000) – 4:14
2. "Fly High" (Sample Madness remix) – 5:06
3. "Fly High" (Supreme mix) – 6:25
4. "Fly High" (acoustic orchestra version) – 4:04
5. "Fly High" (Sharp Boys U.K. vocal mix) – 4:14
6. "Fly High" (Saturation remix) – 3:55
7. "Appears" (HW club mix) – 5:26
8. "Fly High" (Dub's F remix) – 10:43
9. "Fly High" (non-stop mix N.S dance mega mix) – 12:52
10. "Kanariya" (fake compilation) – 5:11
11. "Fly High" (vocal track) – 3:20
- 12" vinyl
1. "Fly High" (Hal's mix 2000) – 4:14
2. "Fly High" (acoustic orchestra version) – 4:04

== Credits and personnel ==
Credits adapted from the liner notes of the single's physical release.

Recording

- Recorded at Prime Sound Studio, Studio Sound Dali, Onkio Haus, Tokyo, Japan in 1999.

Credits

- Ayumi Hamasaki – vocals, songwriting, background vocals
- Max Matsuura – production
- Dai Nagao – composing, programming, mastering
- HΛL – composing, synthesizers, keyboards
- Naoto Suzuki – sound producing
- Naoya Akimoto – electric guitar
- Wataru Takeishi – music video director
- Dave Way – mixing

== Charts ==
=== Weekly charts ===
Chart (2000)	Peak position
Japan (Oricon)	3
Japan (Count Down TV Chart) (TBS)	3

=== Year-end charts ===
Chart (2000)	Peak position
Japan (Oricon)	89
Japan Count Down TV (TBS)	94

== Certifications and sales ==
Region	Certification	Certified units/sales
Japan (RIAJ)	Gold	299,540

== Release history ==
Region	Date	Format	Label
Japan	February 9, 2000	CD single	Avex Trax; Avex Entertainment Inc.
Japan	Digital download	September 2008 (Note: There is currently insufficient evidence to determine what date Hamasaki's digital releases appeared on online retails. The closest source for iTunes Store evidence is provided by Jame World, who confirmed Hamasaki's work was released worldwide on iTunes in September 2008.)	Avex Entertainment Inc.
Australia	Digital download	September 2008	Avex Entertainment Inc.
New Zealand	Digital download	September 2008	Avex Entertainment Inc.
United Kingdom	Digital download	September 2008	Avex Entertainment Inc.
Ireland	Digital download	September 2008	Avex Entertainment Inc.
Germany	Digital download	September 2008	Avex Entertainment Inc.
Spain	Digital download	September 2008	Avex Entertainment Inc.
France	Digital download	September 2008	Avex Entertainment Inc.
Italy	Digital download	September 2008	Avex Entertainment Inc.
Taiwan	Digital download	September 2008	Avex Entertainment Inc.
