= Loveppears =

- Standard cover; the 20th Anniversary Edition features a long portrait of Hamasaki.

Studio album by Ayumi Hamasaki
- Released: November 10, 1999
- Recorded: January–October 1999
- Studios: Prime Sound Studio (Tokyo); Studio Sound Dali (Tokyo); Onkio Haus (Tokyo); Soundtrack Studios (New York City)
- Genres: Electronic; dance; trance; rock; J-pop
- Length: 70:47 (Disc 1); 34:06 (Disc 2)
- Label: Avex Trax
- Producer: Max Matsuura

Ayumi Hamasaki chronology
| A Song for ×× (1999) | Loveppears (1999) | Duty (2000) |

Singles from Loveppears
- 1. "Whatever" Released: February 10, 1999; 2. "Love (Destiny)" Released: April 14, 1999; 3. "To Be" Released: May 12, 1999; 4. "Boys & Girls" Released: July 14, 1999; 5. "A" Released: August 11, 1999; 6. "Appears" Released: November 10, 1999; 7. "Kanariya" Released: December 8, 1999; 8. "Fly High" Released: February 9, 2000

Loveppears (stylized as LOVEppears) is the second studio album by Japanese singer Ayumi Hamasaki. It was released on November 10, 1999, by Avex Trax, ten months after her debut album, A Song for xx (1999). It was additionally distributed in a variety of formats and on different dates throughout Asia. Loveppears was written entirely by Hamasaki, produced by Max Matsuura, and includes collaborations with composers such as Hal, Dai Nagao, D.A.I, Yasuhiko Hoshino, and Kazuhito Kikuchi, among others. Musically, it is a departure from her previous record and incorporates more electronic and dance sounds with elements of trance, house, J-pop, and rock. Lyrically, it explores themes of love, frustration with life, loneliness, and individualism.

Music critics gave Loveppears positive reviews, with some praising its dance-oriented nature, its production style, and highlighting certain tracks on the record. Some publications regarded it as one of Hamasaki's best records to date. Commercially, it peaked at number one in Japan and was certified double million by the Recording Industry Association of Japan (RIAJ) for exceeding two million copies sold. Since its release, it has sold over 2.5 million units in the region, making it one of the best-selling records in Japanese history. The album produced eight singles, all of which were commercially successful; "Love (Destiny)" became the singer's first number-one single in the region, while "A" remains her best-selling release to date.

To promote the album, Hamasaki appeared in several commercials and campaigns, becoming a brand staple in the Japanese market. Several remix albums featuring many Loveppears songs were released, including Super Eurobeat Presents Ayu-ro Mix (2000), which is one of the best-selling remix albums to date. Hamasaki later embarked on two nationwide concert tours in Japan, which were later released on DVD and VHS. To commemorate the album's release, a 20th Anniversary repackage was released in 2019, which included previously released remixes, music videos, and material.

== Background and composition ==
On January 1, 1999, Hamasaki released her debut studio album, A Song for xx. Music critics gave the album mixed-to-positive reviews, and it was a commercial success in Japan, selling more than 1.4 million units. However, one month later, Hamasaki debuted new music with the release of her single "Whatever" on February 10. In the midst, Hamasaki's label Avex Trax decided to promote her work with a remix album titled Ayu-mi-x (1999), which featured elements of house, trance, reggae, and orchestral music, as opposed to her J-pop sound from her debut. Inspired by these genres, she continued to work on new music, releasing singles throughout 1999 and collaborating with new composers such as Hal, Dai Nagao, D.A.I, Yasuhiko Hoshino, and Kazuhito Kikuchi, among many others. Hamasaki wrote the entire album, which was produced by Max Matsuura, who previously worked on A Song for xx. Hamasaki recorded the album at Prime Sound Studio, Studio Sound Dali, and Onkio Haus in Tokyo, as well as Soundtrack Studios in New York.

Musically, Loveppears is a departure from her previous album, and incorporates more electronic and dance sounds with elements of trance, techno, house, J-pop, and rock. Neil Z. Yeung of AllMusic noted the "high energy" of tracks like "Fly High", "Boys & Girls", and "Whatever", which "took Hamasaki straight to the dancefloor", while describing "And Then" as "hardened dub" and observing rock elements in "Appears." CD Journal reviews pointed out dance ("Trauma", "And Then", "Too Late"), mid-tempo compositions ("Monochrome"), and techno-trance genres ("Whatever"). Several songs on the album are also revised versions of its single releases; "Immature", "Too Late", "Appears", and "Monochrome" are edited for the album, "P.S. II" samples lyrics from her song "Powder Snow" of A Song for xx, "Love (Refrain)" is a revised version of the single "Love (Destiny)", and "Whatever" is an extended dub of the single version. Additionally, the original mix of "Kanariya" appears as a hidden track. The album's lyrics explore themes of love, frustration, loneliness, and individualism, which have been echoed in Hamasaki's subsequent work until I Am... (2002). The song "Trauma" has been interpreted as a potential link between Hamasaki's personal trauma and her father abandoning her family as a child. "To Be" symbolizes strength and growth from past experiences, while "End Roll" emphasizes moving on from the past. "Appears" explores romantic feelings towards someone, while "Whatever" examines the ambivalence of these feelings.

== Release and packaging ==
"The title Loveppears has two meanings to it, ‘thing that seems like love’ and ‘discrepancy between what we see and what's really there.’ ...Before my trip to New York for the jacket photo shoot, I looked out the window from inside the car, and there was a couple that looked so happy, but I personally was thinking, maybe they're in the middle of a serious crisis. Or maybe they're actually talking about separating. So I thought of the meaning "seems to be" for the word "appears" and stuck it on there. We give ourselves certain outward appearances and images, trying to make it look like things are good or bad, whatever we want to show people, but really things aren't as we're showing."

— Hamasaki explaining the title Loveppears.

Avex Trax released Loveppears on November 10, 1999, ten months after A Song for xx (1999). It contains 17 tracks in total; a bonus disc includes two megamixes of Hamasaki's work, remixes of the tracks "A Song for xx", "Powder Snow", and "Friend II" that originally appeared on her previous album, as well as enhanced content such as commercial files, small audio samples of all her recordings, internet links, images of magazine appearances, files of Hamasaki's voice, and images of Hamasaki photographed in New York City. Furthermore, the album was released in a variety of formats throughout Asia on different dates. It was repackaged as a memory stick in Japan in 2012, with the bonus material removed. To mark the album's 20th anniversary, Avex Trax repackaged and remastered it with the single "Appears" in two formats: the original album and a bonus disc containing bonus material and additional remixes from the original formats of "Appears". The second edition came in a large digipak with a laminated sleeve and included the same material split into three discs, as well as two discs containing additional remixes of "Appears" and music videos for each single from the Loveppears campaign. Avex Trax also distributed it digitally and through streaming platforms. An album advertisement was added to Hamasaki's YouTube channel, along with lyric videos for "To Be" and "Appears", which included a compilation of concert footage, unreleased scenes from each song's music video, and additional visuals.

Toru Kumazawa photographed the album cover and promotional campaign in Los Angeles and New York City, featuring Hamasaki wearing a long brown wig that covers her breasts in front of a city view. A second version of the album cover, with Hamasaki wearing darker make-up and wig, served as the cover sleeve for "Appears". Known as "White Ayu" and "Black Ayu", Hamasaki stated about the two covers; "The jacket idea was Ayu's idea during a meeting with the staff. You might be wondering what I'm talking about, but it was something like, 'No clothes on the upper half of the body! Let's hide our breasts with our hair,' and it was decided in a flash." The technique of hiding her breasts with her hair was inspired by the photo book Nocturne by Izumi Sakai, who was known at the time for modelling as a race queen in 1990. The full-body makeup transformation was influenced by a 1997 Kanebo Cosmetics commercial for "Bronze Love (ブロンズラヴ)" by Tomomi Kahara. Hamasaki's decision to name the album Loveappears was influenced by the album's content. She stated, "While working on A Song for xx, during the sad times that I couldn't shake, I'd always be saying 'I'm very sad, I can't shake this.' Quietly crying, quietly wounded, quietly mourning. But with Loveppears, I express it with furious sounds, shouting out, screaming."

The two artworks garnered considerable attention from publications. According to Laura Miller of Beauty Up: Exploring Contemporary Japanese Body Aesthetics, Hamasaki's inclusion shows a "playful attitude towards racial categorisation" compared to Westernised singers. She also highlights its use in Japanese fashion and beauty. Lisa Takeuchi Allen of Time described the cover as an example of Hamasaki's "attention-grabbing image change", noting that each cover made her appear Caucasian and Black. In retrospect, Singaporean photographer Leslie Kee, who had photographed some of Hamasaki's album covers, said, "I’ve never seen anything like it. She controls every detail of her image. She knows what she wants, likes, needs, hates, and is very, very particular."

== Promotion ==
"Boys & Girls" (1999)
"Boys & Girls", a dance-oriented J-pop song, proved to be a success to Hamasaki's career.

During the release of Loveppears, Hamasaki appeared in a number of commercials and campaigns throughout Japan and Asia, including those for various food snacks, vehicles, and technology. She was covered on several magazines in Japan, including The Ichiban, Zappy, Girlpop, CDData, ViVi, An An, and Girl Hits. In a previous review, Alexey Eremenko of AllMusic wrote that "its success boosted by ad contracts that Hamasaki has raked in ever since as a spokesman, beginning with the Asian cosmetics juggernaut Kose (later she also worked for the likes of Honda and Panasonic)." As this effect spread throughout her career following the release of Loveppears and subsequent records, Hamasaki initially supported the commercial exploitation of her popularity, stating that it was "necessary that [she is] viewed as a product," but eventually opposed Avex's decision to market her as a "product rather than a person." Furthermore, Hamasaki embarked on two back-to-back concert tours, beginning in Chiba on April 28, 2000, and ending in Yokohama on August 9; live DVD and VHS versions of each tour were released on September 13 of that year. Several Loveppears tracks appeared on remix albums from 1999 to the 2000s, the first being Super Eurobeat Presents Ayu-ro Mix (2000), which was a commercial success in Japan and is one of the best-selling remix albums of all time. In Japan, a four-part remix series was released on March 8, 2000; the albums featured themed remixes by Japanese producers, American and European composers, an orchestral version of many songs from her career, and a non-stop megamix version. Her 2000 VHS titled A Clips included music videos for "Whatever", "Love (Destiny)", "To Be", "Boys & Girls", "Appears", "Kanariya", "Fly High", and other album promotional footage. Hamasaki made her debut at the Kōhaku Uta Gassen special in 1999, performing "Boys & Girls".

=== Singles and other songs ===
"Whatever" was the album's lead single, released on February 10, 1999, by Avex Trax. Despite mixed reviews from critics, it was a commercial success in Japan, peaking at number five on the Oricon Singles Chart and being certified gold by the RIAJ for exceeding 200,000 units sold in the country. "Love (Destiny)" was released as the second single on April 14, and it became Hamasaki's first single to top the Japanese singles chart. It was certified platinum for selling more than 400,000 units. On May 12, "To Be" was released as the third single, reaching number five in Japan and earning platinum certification. "Boys & Girls" was released as the fourth single on July 14 and reached number one in Japan. It was also Hamasaki's first single to sell more than a million units in the country. On August 11, "A" was released as the fifth single and includes the album tracks "Monochrome", "Too Late", "Trauma", and "End Roll", as well as additional remixes and instrumental versions of each song. It peaked at number one in Japan and became Hamasaki's best-selling single of her career, selling over 1.7 million copies in total. "Appears" was released as the album's sixth single on the same day it was released, with only 300,000 copies printed. Commercially, it peaked at number two on the single chart, earning gold certification in the country. On December 8, "Kanariya" became the album's seventh single and peaked at number one in Japan, where it was certified gold; it also only had 300,000 copies printed. The album's eighth and final single, "Fly High," was released on February 9, 2000, and reached number three in Japan; like its predecessor, 300,000 units were only printed.

Several singles were reissued on multiple occasions. "Whatever", "Love (Destiny)", and "To Be" were all repackaged as CD singles with bonus content in 2001, and they all received commercial success in Japan. In the United Kingdom, "Appears" and "Whatever" were distributed as a double A-side vinyl, while "Monochrome" was released separately in the same region. Vinyl versions of the songs "Boys & Girls", "Kanariya" (also labelled as "Canary"), "Fly High", "Trauma", "Monochrome", and "Too Late" were released in the United States. Remixes and vinyl versions of "Appears" were also available in Germany. During Hamasaki's 2000 Japanese concert tour, limited edition picture disc vinyls were released for the singles "Boys & Girls", "Fly High", and a double A-side of "Appears" and "Immature." The song "Who..." was certified platinum by the RIAJ after exceeding 250,000 downloads in the country.

== Reception ==
Professional ratings
Review scores
| Source | Rating |
|---|---|
| AllMusic | 4/5 stars |
| CDJournal | (positive) |

Loveppears received positive reviews from music critics. The record was described as "bold" and "high quality" by CDJournal, and the producers and composers were praised for their contributions. Yeung of Allmusic gave the record four stars, calling it "bolder and better in every way" than her previous album, and claiming that tracks like "And Then" and "Appears" had "pushed her artistic boundaries with exciting new additions to her arsenal." Finally, Yeung saw it as one of Hamasaki's best records of her career. Chūō Kōron reported that the Loveppears material had a significant impact on Hamasaki's younger audience in Japan. Popular TV believed Loveppears cemented Hamasaki's status as a "queen" of Japanese pop. Loveppears won Best Pop Album of the Year, and "A" won Song of the Year at the Japan Gold Disc Awards. "Boys & Girls" received the Gold Award at the 42nd Japan Record Awards. In a Goo poll in which the audience was asked to vote on Hamasaki's most popular songs, "Whatever", "Fly High", "A", "Appears", "Love (Destiny)", "To Be", and "Boys & Girls" were included. whereas AllMusic selected "Whatever", "Trauma", "Boys & Girls", "And Then" and "To Be" as standouts to Hamasaki's career.

Loveppears debuted at number one on the Oricon Albums Chart, her second album to do so. It sold 1,201,870 units in its first week, more than doubling her previous album's sales and making it the 34th fastest-selling record in the country. It was also her first record to sell over one million units in its inaugural week. It became the 14th best-selling album of the year, selling 1,443,490 copies, and made her the fourth highest-selling female artist of 1999, trailing only American singer Mariah Carey and Japanese singers Ami Suzuki and Hikaru Utada. By the end of 2000, Loveppears had sold an additional 1,077,960 units and was the 14th best-selling record of that year. By the end of the fiscal year, it was recognised as one of three Avex albums that sold well despite a "flat" return to the Japanese market, along with Cruise Records 1995-2000 by Japanese band Globe and ID by Japanese singer Nanase Aikawa. When it was re-released in 2019, it debuted at number nine and remained on the charts for five weeks. Loveppears was certified double million by the RIAJ for exceeding shipments of two million units; the album has sold 2.562 million units in the country, making it her third best-selling release after Duty (2000) with 2.9 million and A Best (2001) with 4.2 million sales, and one of the best-selling records in Japanese history.

== Track listing ==
Loveppears track listing
| No. | Title | Music | Arranger(s) | Length |
|---|---|---|---|---|
| 1. | "Introduction" | Hal | Hal | 1:09 |
| 2. | "Fly High" | Dai Nagao | Hal | 4:07 |
| 3. | "Trauma" | D.A.I | Naoto Suzuki; Dai Nagao | 4:17 |
| 4. | "And Then" | Yasuhiko Hoshino | Keisuke Kikuchi | 4:14 |
| 5. | "Immature" (Album Version) | Kazuhito Kikuchi | HΛL | 4:44 |
| 6. | "Boys & Girls" | Nagao | Suzuki; Nagao | 3:54 |
| 7. | "To Be" (Album Version) | Nagao | Suzuki; Nagao | 5:18 |
| 8. | "End Roll" | Nagao | Suzuki; Nagao | 4:49 |
| 9. | "P.S II" | Hideaki Kuwabara | Akimitsu Honma | 4:48 |
| 10. | "Whatever" ("Dub's 1999 Remix") | Kazuhito Kikuchi | Izumi Miyazaki | 7:20 |
| 11. | "Too Late" (Album Version) | Nagao | Suzuki; Nagao | 4:25 |
| 12. | "Appears" (Album Version) | Kikuchi | Hal | 5:38 |
| 13. | "Monochrome" (Album Version) | Hal | Suzuki; Nagao | 4:21 |
| 14. | "Interlude" | Suzuki | Suzuki | 0:55 |
| 15. | "Love (Refrain)" | Tsunku | Suzuki | 5:21 |
| 16. | "Who..." | Kikuchi | Suzuki | 5:35 |
| 17. | "Kanariya" (Hidden track) | Yasuhiko Hoshino | CPM-Marvin | 3:52 |

Bonus disc track listing
| No. | Title | Length |
|---|---|---|
| 1. | "Ayu's Euro Mega-Mix" (Y&Co. Mix) | 9:48 |
| 2. | "Ayu's House Mega-Mix" (N.S House Mix) | 9:58 |
| 3. | "A Song for xx" (Millennium Mix) | 4:46 |
| 4. | "Powder Snow" (Acoustic Orchestra Version) | 5:03 |
| 5. | "Friend II" (Make My Mad Mix) | 4:31 |

20th Anniversary disc three track listing
| No. | Title | Length |
|---|---|---|
| 1. | "Appears" (99 Greeting Mix) | 5:39 |
| 2. | "Appears" (Scud Filter Mix) | 6:05 |
| 3. | "Appears" (Dub's Eurotech Remix) | 8:05 |
| 4. | "Whatever" (Ferry 'System F' Corsten dub mix) | 7:40 |
| 5. | "Appears" (JP's SoundFactory Mix) | 8:00 |
| 6. | "Appears" (HAL's MIX) | 4:41 |
| 7. | "Immature" (D-Z DUAL LUCIFER MIX) | 4:36 |
| 8. | "Whatever" (Ferry 'System F' Corsten vocal extended mix) | 6:31 |
| 9. | "Appears" (Keith Litman's Mix of Truth) | 8:27 |
| 10. | "Immature" (JT Original CM Version) | 4:48 |
| 11. | "Appears" (99 Greeting Mix (Instrumental)) | 5:40 |
| 12. | "Immature" (JT Original CM Version (Instrumental)) | 4:45 |

20th Anniversary limited disc four track listing
| No. | Title | Length |
|---|---|---|
| 1. | "Appears" (Hal‘s Progress) |
| 2. | "Appears" (Acoustic version) |
| 3. | "Appears" (Armin van Buuren’s remix) |
| 4. | "Appears" (Junior‘s Appears On The Air) |
| 5. | "Appears" (HW Club Mix) |
| 6. | "Appears" (DJ-TURBO remix) |
| 7. | "Appears" (Junior’s Club Mix) |
| 8. | "Appears" (HW Tokyo Hard House Mix) |
| 9. | "Appears" (Armin van Buuren‘s Sunset Dub) |
| 10. | "Appears" (Aggressive Extended Mix) |
| 11. | "Appears" (Melodic Extended Mix) |
| 12. | "Appears" (Shinichi Osawa Mix) |
| 13. | "Appears" (Inst melo version) |

20th Anniversary limited DVD track listing
| No. | Title | Length |
|---|---|---|
| 1. | "Fly high" |
| 2. | "Boys & Girls" |
| 3. | "To Be" |
| 4. | "Whatever" |
| 5. | "Appears" |
| 6. | "Kanariya" |
| 7. | "Love (Destiny)" |
| 8. | "Who... (Live Lyric Video)" |
| 9. | "Trauma (Choreography Video)" |

=== Additional notes ===
- Dai Nagao is credited as the alias D.A.I. in the liner notes.

== Personnel ==
Musicians

- Ayumi Hamasaki – vocals, background vocals, songwriting
- Max Matsuura – producer, additional production
- Jun Kujiwara – guitar
- Masayoshi Furukawa – guitar
- Naoki Harashibe – guitar
- Naoya Akimoto – guitar
- Hidetoshi Suzuki – guitar
- Naoto Suzuki – keyboards, synthesizers, mixing, arrangement, composer, additional production
- Hal – mixing, arrangement, composer, keyboards, synthesizers
- Tatsuyan Ikeda – marketing
- Kentaro Furusawa – marketing
- Yasuhiro Yamamoto – marketing
- Akiiro Terada – marketing
- Toru Kumazawa – photography
- Koji Matsumoto – glam team
- Tadamasa Tagami – glam team
- Gina – assistant photography
- Chika – glam team
- Taro – glam team
- Kananko Miura – glam team
- Shinichi Hara – art direction
- Michiho Ogasawara – design
- Toshikazu Sakawa – creative co-ordination
- Eddy Schreyer – mastering

== Charts ==
=== Weekly charts ===
| Chart (1999) | Peak position |
|---|---|
| Japanese Albums (Oricon) | 1 |

| Chart (2019) | Peak position |
|---|---|
| Japanese Albums (Oricon) | 9 |

=== Year-end charts ===
| Chart (1999) | Peak position |
|---|---|
| Japanese Albums (Oricon) | 15 |

| Chart (2000) | Peak position |
|---|---|
| Japanese Albums (Oricon) | 14 |

=== Decade-end charts ===
| Chart (1990–1999) | Position |
|---|---|
| Japanese Albums (Oricon) | 28 |

=== All-time chart ===
| Chart | Position |
|---|---|
| Japanese Albums (Oricon) | 40 |

== Certification and sales ==
| Region | Certification | Certified units/sales |
|---|---|---|
| Japan (RIAJ) | 2× Million | 2,562,130 |

== Release history ==
Loveppears release history
| Region | Date | Format | Editions | Label | Ref. |
|---|---|---|---|---|---|
| Japan | November 10, 1999 | CD | Standard; bonus disc | Avex Trax | |
| Hong Kong | November 1999 | CD | Standard; bonus disc | Avex Trax | |
| Taiwan | November 17, 1999 | CD | Standard; bonus disc | Avex Trax | |
| Thailand | 1999 | Cassette | Standard | Avex Trax | |
| China | 2000 | CD | Standard | China Record Shanghai Corporation | |
| China | 2005 | CD | Standard | China Record Shanghai Corporation | |
| Japan | March 21, 2012 | Memory stick | Standard | Avex Trax | |
| Japan | November 10, 2019 | CD; DVD; digital download; streaming | Standard; bonus disc; limited edition | Avex Trax | |

== See also ==
- Ayumi Hamasaki discography
- List of awards received by Ayumi Hamasaki
- List of Oricon number-one albums of 1999
