= Boys & Girls (Ayumi Hamasaki song) =

Single by Ayumi Hamasaki

from the album Loveppears
- Released: July 14, 1999
- Recorded: 1999
- Genre: Dance
- Length: 3:54
- Label: Avex Trax; Avex USA; Avex Entertainment Inc.
- Songwriter: Ayumi Hamasaki
- Producer: Max Matsuura

Ayumi Hamasaki singles chronology
"To Be" (1999)	"Boys & Girls" (1999)	"A" (1999)

Official Music Video
- "Boys & Girls" on YouTube

"Boys & Girls" is a song recorded by Japanese recording artist Ayumi Hamasaki, serving as the fourth single for her second studio album, Loveppears (1999). It was released by Avex Trax in Japan and Hong Kong on July 14, 1999, and through Avex USA in North America in early 2001, while being re-distributed in 2003. "Boys & Girls" marks Hamasaki's first single to be made available for purchase as a maxi single with additional remixes. The track was written by the singer herself, while production was handled by long-time collaborator Max Matsuura. Musically, the song is a dance recording, a genre that heavily influences Loveppears. The single's lyrical content is written in third-person perspective.

Upon its release, "Boys & Girls" received positive reviews from music critics, with some praising the original version of the song, but also acclaiming the different selection of remixes on its physical release. Commercially, the single experienced success in Japan, being subjected to a controversial competition with the song "Be Together" by Japanese recording artist Ami Suzuki, who eventually outperformed "Boys & Girls" during its first charting week on the Oricon Singles Chart. It became Hamasaki's first single to sell over one million copies, and was certified double Platinum by the Recording Industry Association of Japan (RIAJ) for shipments of 800,000 units.

An accompanying music video was directed by Wataru Takeishi, and featured Hamasaki in an orange-lit room circulated by mysterious light and furniture. In order to promote the single, it appeared on several remix and greatest hits compilation albums and live concert tours conducted by Hamasaki. "Boys & Girls" was additionally used as the theme song for the cosmetics company Aube, which led to the singer becoming their spokeswoman. To date, the recording is one of the best-selling singles in Japanese music history and remains one of her highest-selling tracks.

== Background and release ==
"Boys & Girls" (1999)
A 20-second sample of "Boys & Girls", a dance recording similar to the content of its parent album.

"Boys & Girls" was written by Hamasaki herself, while production was handled by long-time collaborator Max Matsuura. The song was composed by Dai Nagao—who used the alias D.A.I. through production credits and Aube for the maxi single notes—whilst it was arranged by Nagao and Japanese musician Naoto Suzuki. It was mixed by Dave Ford, and mastered by Shigeo Miyamoto. Musically, "Boys & Girls" is a dance song, a genre that heavily influences its parent album, Loveppears (1999). The recording's instrumentation consists of synthesizers and keyboards managed by Suzuki, while electric guitar is provided by Hidetoshi Suzuki. Programming was handled by Takahiro Iida. According to the demo sheet music published at Ultimate Guitar Archive, the song is set in time signature of common time with a tempo of 130 beats per minute. Its chord progression develops in E-A-D-G-B-E. Lyrically, "Boys & Girls" was written in third person perspective, a trait that is shared with the rest of the album's content.

"Boys & Girls" served as the fourth single from Loveppears. It was released by Avex Trax in Japan and Hong Kong on July 14, 1999, and through Avex USA in North America in early 2001, while being re-distributed in 2003. Its CD edition featured a total of ten tracks, seven of which were remixes and its instrumental, plus one remix for both of Hamasaki's previous singles, "Love (Destiny)" (1999) and "To Be" (1999). In early 2001, Avex USA subsequently distributed three 12" vinyls; the first two of them contained remixes produced by American disc jockey Hex Hector, whilst the third vinyl, released in on January 24, 2003, contained remixes by Junior Vasquez. The artwork of the physical and digital formats was shot by Toru Kumazawa, and features several images of Hamasaki in one entire square canvas. A large photo of Hamasaki's face is placed in the center, with it being surrounded by 12 small thumbnails.

== Reception ==
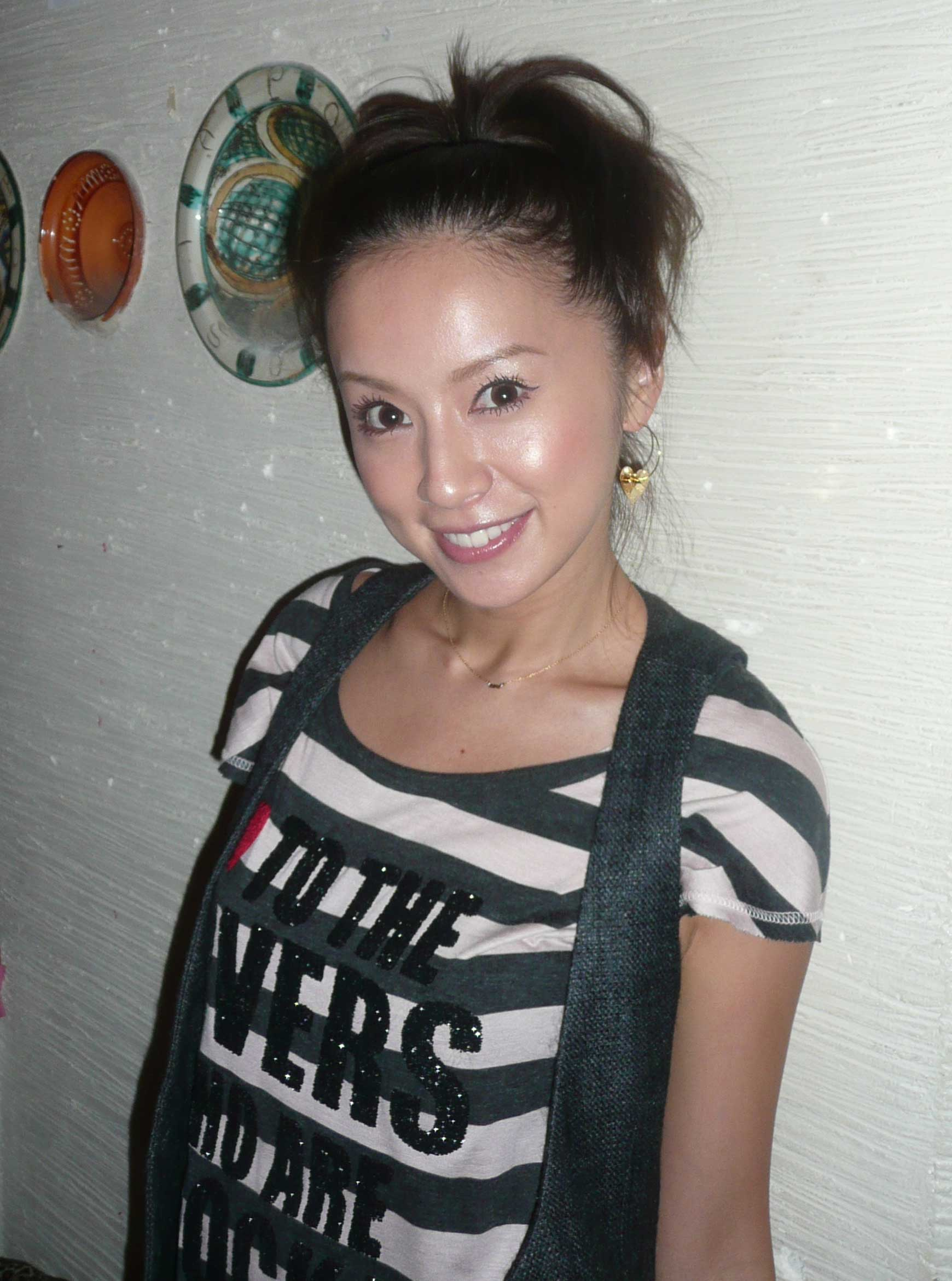
"Boys & Girls" was commercially outperformed by Ami Suzuki's "Be Together" during its first charting week on the Oricon Singles Chart. However, Hamasaki's single then rose to the top position.

Upon its release, "Boys & Girls" received positive reviews from music critics. A member of CD Journal was positive towards the original version of the single, but also complimented the remixes featured on its maxi release. The review concluded that each remix was able to "change different moods", and labelled the release of the recording "high-tension". AllMusic's Alexey Eremenko, who contributed in writing Hamasaki's biography on the website, selected the track as one of her best work.

"Boys & Girls" was subjected to controversy by Japanese media at the time of its release, mainly due to it interspersing with the premiere of Japanese recording artist Ami Suzuki's "Be Together", which was perceived as a direct competition between Suzuki's label, Sony Music, and Hamasaki's label, Avex Trax, in order to score the highest entry on the Oricon Singles Chart. As a result, Suzuki's single topped the Oricon Singles Chart with 317,610 units sold, whilst Hamasaki's recording debuted at number two on that chart, selling 261,750 copies in its first week of availability. The following week, "Boys & Girls" replaced "Be Together" at the top spot, becoming the singer's second single to peak atop after "Love (Destiny)" in May 1999. The recording spent 17 weeks within the top 200, marking one of Hamasaki's longest-spanning songs on the chart. Similarly, it debuted at number two on the Count Down TV chart hosted by Tokyo Broadcasting System (TBS), behind Suzuki's "Be Together". The following week, it reached number one and stayed there for three consecutive weeks, with it lasting 16 weeks within the top 100. In 2008, the single charted at number 33 on Billboard's Adult Alternative Radio chart in Japan.

By the end of 1999, "Boys & Girls" had sold over 1,037,950 units in Japan, thus being ranked at number 11 on Oricon's Annual 1999 chart. Likewise, it charted at number 12 on TBS' Annual Chart. In October 1999, the single was certified double Platinum by the Recording Industry Association of Japan (RIAJ) for shipments of 800,000 units. "Boys & Girls" remains the 225th best-selling single in Japanese music history, and as of July 2016 the singer's fourth highest-selling song according to Oricon Style's database.

== Music video and promotion ==
An accompanying music video for the single was directed by Wataru Takeishi. It opens with Hamasaki walking into a small orange-lit room with a black object on a stall. After touching it, the entire room starts to light up, and the singer subsequently walks around singing to the song; scenes are digitally-altered and edited during the process. Following the first chorus, Hamasaki is seen wearing a white outfit while a mysterious light shines around the room. The video subsequently ends with the singer sitting on a small chair, looking in the distance. The clip was included on several DVD compilations released by Hamasaki: A Clips (2000), A Complete Box Set (2004), the digital release of A Clips Complete (2014), and the DVD and Blu-Ray re-release edition of her 2001 compilation album, A Best (2016). The visual was additionally used as the theme song for Japanese cosmetics company Aube's launch of their lipstick range, which led to Hamasaki becoming their spokeswoman and appearing in a campaign video.

"Boys & Girls" has been heavily promoted on compilation albums conducted by Hamasaki. It has been included on 11 of Hamasaki's remix albums, including Super Eurobeat Presents Ayu-ro Mix and Ayu-mi-x II Version Non-Stop Mega Mix (2001). The single has also been featured on three of Hamasaki's greatest hits albums, A Best (2001), A Complete: All Singles (2007), and A Summer Best (2012). Additionally, it was specially remixed by Junior Vasquez and Hex Hector in order to be added onto her remix extended plays The Other Side One: Hex Hector (2001) and The Other Side Two: Junior Vasquez (2001). The song has been included on three of the singer's major concert tours, including her part one and part two of her 2000 concert tour, her 2000–2001 Countdown live show, her 2006 (Miss)Understood tour, and her 2011 Hotel Love Songs concert tour.

== Track listing ==
- CD single
1. "Boys & Girls" (Mad Filter Mix) – 6:54
2. "Boys & Girls" (Aube Original Mix) – 3:56
3. "Boys & Girls" (Higher Uplift Mix) – 9:50
4. "Love (Destiny)" (Todd's Lovers Conversion) – 6:03
5. "Boys & Girls" (HΛL's Mix) – 4:59
6. "Boys & Girls" (Melt Down Dub Mix) – 4:47
7. "To Be" (Bright Mix) – 5:45
8. "Boys & Girls" (D-Z Psychedelic Assassin Mix) – 5:09
9. "Boys & Girls" (Dub's Club Remix) – 7:26
10. "Boys & Girls" (Aube Original Mix) [Instrumental] – 3:53
- Hex Hector 12" vinyl (part 1)
1. "Boys & Girls" (Hex Hector Main Club Mix) – 9:15
2. "Boys & Girls" (Hex Hector Dub) – 9:07
- Digital download
1. "Boys & Girls" (Mad Filter Mix) – 6:54
2. "Boys & Girls" (Aube Original Mix) – 3:56
3. "Boys & Girls" (Higher Uplift Mix) – 9:50
4. "Love (Destiny)" (Todd's Lovers Conversion) – 6:03
5. "Boys & Girls" (HΛL's Mix) – 4:59
6. "Boys & Girls" (Melt Down Dub Mix) – 4:47
7. "To Be" (Bright Mix) – 5:45
8. "Boys & Girls" (D-Z Psychedelic Assassin Mix) – 5:09
9. "Boys & Girls" (Dub's Club Remix) – 7:26
10. "Boys & Girls" (Aube Original Mix) [Instrumental] – 3:53
- Junior Vasquez 12" vinyl
1. "Boys & Girls" (Junior's Club Mix) – 8:57
2. "Boys & Girls" (Junior's Club Dub) – 8:57
3. "Boys & Girls" (Junior's Boys & Girls Beats) – 6:15

== Credits and personnel ==
Credits adapted from the single's CD release.

Recording

- Recorded at Prime Sound Studio, Studio Sound Dali, Onkio Haus, Tokyo, Japan in 1999.

Technical and songwriting credits

- Ayumi Hamasaki – vocals, songwriting, background vocals
- Max Matsuura – production
- Dai Nagao – composing, arranging
- Naoto Suzuki – sound producing, arranging, keyboards, synthesizers
- Hidetoshi Suzuki – electric guitar
- Shigeo Miyamoto – mastering
- Takahiro Iida – programming
- Wataru Takeishi – music video director
- Dave Ford – mixing

== Charts ==
=== Weekly charts ===
Chart (1999)	Peak position
Japan (Oricon)	1
Japan (Count Down TV)	1

=== Yearly chart ===
Chart (1999)	Peak position
Japan (Oricon)	11
Japan (Count Down TV)	12

== Certification and sales ==
Region	Certification	Certified units/sales
Japan (RIAJ)	2× Platinum	1,037,950

== Release history ==
Region	Date	Format	Label
Japan	July 14, 1999	CD single	Avex Trax; Avex Entertainment Inc.
Hong Kong	July 14, 1999	CD single	Avex Trax; Avex Entertainment Inc.
North America	January 24, 2000	Hex Hector 12" vinyl	Avex USA
North America	January 24, 2000	Junior Vazquez 12" vinyl	Avex USA
Japan	September 2008 (Note: There is currently insufficient evidence to determine what date Hamasaki's digital releases appeared on online retails. The closest source for an iTunes Store evidence is at Jame World, who confirmed Hamasaki's work was released worldwide on iTunes in September 2008.)	Digital download	Avex Trax; Avex Entertainment Inc.
Australia	September 2008	Digital download	Avex Entertainment Inc.
New Zealand	September 2008	Digital download	Avex Entertainment Inc.
United Kingdom	September 2008	Digital download	Avex Entertainment Inc.
Ireland	September 2008	Digital download	Avex Entertainment Inc.
Germany	September 2008	Digital download	Avex Entertainment Inc.
Spain	September 2008	Digital download	Avex Entertainment Inc.
France	September 2008	Digital download	Avex Entertainment Inc.
Italy	September 2008	Digital download	Avex Entertainment Inc.
Taiwan	September 2008	Digital download	Avex Entertainment Inc.

== See also ==
- List of Oricon number-one singles of 1999
