= Jonathan Peters =

American DJ, remixer and producer (born 1969)

- Also known as: Luminaire, J.P.
- Born: January 25, 1969 (age 57); United States
- Origin: New York City; New Jersey
- Genres: Club; Dance; Trance; Progressive House
- Occupations: DJ; producer; remixer
- Years active: 1985–present

Jonathan Peters (born January 25, 1969) is an American DJ, remixer and producer. He is known for his remix of Whitney Houston's "My Love Is Your Love". He was the long-time resident DJ of the Manhattan nightclub The Sound Factory. In 2006, Jonathan Peters was voted America's Best DJ by DJ Times Magazine.

== Discography ==
=== Albums ===
Title	Details	Peak chart positions
Title	Details	US Dance
Live With Jonathan Peters	Released: 2002; Format: Digital download, CD	20
Revelation: The S&M Party (Live At Soundfactory)	Released: 2003; Format: Digital download, CD	24
Jonathan Peters Presents: Pacha New York	Released: 2008; Format: Digital download, CD	21

=== Singles ===
Title	Year	Peak chart positions		Album
Title	Year	US Airplay	US Club	Album
"Flower Duet '99" (Jonathan Peters Presents Luminaire)	1999	—	14	Non-album singles
"All This Time" (Jonathan Peters Presents Sylver Logan Sharp)	2005	1	—	Non-album singles
"Music (Happy Radio") (Jonathan Peters featuring Maya)	2005	—	15	Non-album singles
