= A (Ayumi Hamasaki EP) =

EP by Ayumi Hamasaki
- Released: August 11, 1999
- Recorded: January–July 1999
- Studios: Prime Sound Studio, Studio Sound Dali, Onkio Haus (Tokyo, Japan); Soundtrack (New York City, New York)
- Genres: Pop rock; dance
- Length: 75:48
- Labels: Avex Trax; Avex Entertainment
- Producer: Max Matsuura

Ayumi Hamasaki chronology
| A Song for ×× (1999) | A (1999) | Loveppears (1999) |

Singles from A
- 1. "Monochrome" Released: August 11, 1999; 2. "Too Late" Released: August 11, 1999; 3. "Trauma" Released: August 11, 1999; 4. "End Roll" Released: August 11, 1999

A (stylized as) is an extended play (EP) (Note: The classification of A as a single, EP, or album has been disputed. Technically, Avex Trax marketed A as a single—it served as the fifth single from Hamasaki's album Loveppears and charted on the Oricon Singles Chart. However, the Recording Industry Association of Japan (RIAJ) recognized the release as an album and certified it as such. A can be further disputed as an extended play according to definitions outlined by top organisations outside of Japan; according to off-related sources such as The Official Charts Company (BPI), About.com, and Enki Village, an EP can typically include an average of four tracks but does not count remixes and alternative versions. Knowing that A is a single inside of Loveppears, it can be easily recognized as an EP-single rather than an album.) by Japanese recording artist Ayumi Hamasaki. It was released by Avex Trax in Japan and Hong Kong on August 11, 1999, in 10 different editions, and through Avex Entertainment Inc. worldwide in September 2008. It additionally served as a single from her second studio album Loveppears (1999), and is her first single marketed as an EP. The 12-track EP contains four new original songs: "Monochrome", "Too Late", "Trauma", and "End Roll", and eight remixes. All songs were written by Hamasaki, while production was handled by long-time collaborator Max Matsuura.

Musically, like Loveppears, A is a pop rock album with dance music influences. Lyrically, the new songs are written from a third-person perspective, and deal with themes such as nostalgia, anxiety, and trauma. Upon release, A received favorable reviews from music critics for its individual tracks—some of which were highlighted as examples of Hamasaki's best work—and as a collection, with additional praise for the production quality of the EP versions of the original songs over that of their parent album counterparts. Some criticism was directed towards the number of remixes present on the EP.

Commercially, the single peaked at number one in Japan, on the Oricon Singles Chart and TBS' Count Down TV chart. It became Hamasaki's second consecutive single to sell over one million copies domestically—it is also the singer's highest-selling single—and was certified Million by the Recording Industry Association of Japan (RIAJ) for shipments of one million units. Hamasaki did not film any music videos for the new songs, but appeared in several commercials broadcast in Japan that featured the new music. Each original song has subsequently been included on various greatest hits albums released by Hamasaki, including A Best (2001) and A Complete: All Singles (2008). "A" currently ranks as the 57th highest selling Japanese single of all time.

== Content and composition ==
A was Hamasaki's first extended play release, and was her first EP to be marketed as a single in Japan. The EP consists of four recordings: "Monochrome", "Too Late", "Trauma", and "End Roll", all written by Hamasaki herself and produced by Japanese musician and her long-time collaborator Max Matsuura. The three songs apart from "Monochrome" were composed by Japanese musician Dai Nagao, who used the alias D.A.I., whilst the latter track was composed by Japanese band HΛL. The tracks were arranged by Naoto Suzuki and Nagao, and eventually mixed by American engineer Dave Ford; the edited versions that appeared on Hamasaki's second studio album Loveppears (1999) were re-vised and mixed by Dave Way. Naoto played the keyboards and synthesizers in all four original tracks, whilst Jun Kajiwara, Naoki Hayashibe, both Hidetoshi Suzuki and Naoki Hayashibe, and Hayashibe played the electric guitar in "Trauma", "End Roll", "Too Late", and "Monochrome" respectively.

Musically, A was described by staff members at AllMusic as a pop rock release. However, like a majority of the sounds throughout the parent album, the original tracks are also inspired by dance music. A staff member from Japanese magazine CD Journal commented that both "Trauma" and "Too Late" were dance tunes, whilst "Monochrome" was set at a medium tempo. Lyrically, the song was written in third person perspective, a trait that is shared with the rest of the album's tracks. The review at CD Journal noted that each track included different emotions and themes; Hamasaki talked about her anxiety in "Too Late", nostalgia in "Monochrome", and "transforming" trauma into positivity in "Trauma".

== Release ==
A was released by Avex Trax in Japan and Hong Kong on August 11, 1999, in 10 different editions, and through Avex Entertainment Inc. worldwide in September 2008. The EP included the four original recordings, plus four remixes, two bonus remix tracks through first press issues of the single, and an instrumental version for the original songs. To market each original track in Japan, Avex distributed four different editions of the single by changing the compact disc colors, these being blue, green, orange, and red. For each color, the original recordings included on the track list is shifted down one and each variation were limited to 70,000 units. (Note: To understand the track list changes, visit the link here to view the Master release of A at Discogs.com) After the single sold over one million units in Japan, Avex Trax distributed a limited gold edition disc that was noted by the company through the liner notes as just a sticker. This edition was limited to 100,000 copies in Japan.

However, after the first gold version sold over its limit, Avex published a second gold disc titled the Shining Gold CD to 150,000 copies in Japan. The disc was made of real gold, and the artwork of Hamasaki was tinted gold. Two promotional 12" vinyls were distributed in Japan by Rhythm Republic on October 16, 1999; the first vinyl featured a remix for both "Too Late" and "Monochrome", whilst the second vinyl included a remix for each original recording. The artwork was photographed by Toru Kumazawa, and features Hamasaki in a black dress in front of a black backdrop, holding onto a long piece of white string. The logo on the artwork was the first establishment of Hamasaki's logo/emblem, a staple she has used ever since.

Although the original recordings were promoted together with the EP, each of them were distributed in Japan and worldwide as individual singles. "Monochrome" was remixed by American DJ Keith Litman, and released in North America in early 2001, whilst English electronic music group The Orb remixed the track and released it in the United Kingdom by Badorb.com on July 21, 2001; the latter release was limited to 486 vinyls. American duo Thunderpuss remixed the track "Trauma" and released it in North America through the offices of Avex USA in early 2001. "Too Late" was remixed by Soul Solution and was released in North America through Avex USA in mid-2001.

== Critical response ==
Upon its release, A received favorable reviews from music critics. In a review for Loveppears at CD Journal, a staff member selected "Trauma", "Too Late", "Monochrome", and another album track titled "And Then" as the best songs. In general, the review commended Hamasaki's songwriting and her vocal delivery. However, a separate review for the A at the same publication was mixed. The review complimented the original four recordings, but criticized the amount of remixes and felt the extra editions were not "convincing" for Hamasaki's fan base. In retrospect, AllMusic's Alexey Eremenko, whom contributed to writing Hamasaki's biography on the website, selected "End Roll", "Monochrome", and "Trauma" as an examples of her best work. In 2015, Japanese website Goo.ne.jp hosted a 24-hour only poll for audiences in Japan to vote for their favorite single released by Hamasaki. As a result, A ranked at number 12, with a rating of 32.1 average percent.

== Commercial performance ==
Commercially, the single was a success in Japan. It debuted at number one on the Oricon Singles Chart, selling 508,940 units in its first week of sales. A is the 78th single with the highest first week sales, a record that still holds as of July 2016. It stayed at number one of three non-consecutive weeks, and lasted 18 weeks on the top 200, one of Hamasaki's longest spanning singles on that chart. Likewise, it debuted at number one on the Count Down TV chart hosted by Tokyo Broadcasting System (TBS). It stayed atop of the charts for two weeks, and lasted 17 weeks in the top 100.

By the end of 1999, it had sold over 1,630,540 units in Japan and ranked at number three on Oricon's Annual 1999 chart. It resulted as the highest selling EP–single by any artist at the time, and was the highest selling single by a female artist. Similarly, it ranked at number six on TBS' Annual Chart, the third highest selling single by a female artist (behind two entries by Japanese recording artist Hikaru Utada), alongside being the highest selling EP–single. In July 2000, the single was certified Million by the Recording Industry Association of Japan (RIAJ) for shipments of one million units; this was her second consecutive single to sell over one million units, the first being the previous single from Loveppears "Boys & Girls". As of July 2016, it is Hamasaki's highest selling physical single of her entire career on Oricon Style's data base, and is the 57th best selling single in Japan of all time; it is the ninth highest selling single by a female artist. (Note: There has been a dispute in which is Hamasaki's highest selling single. According to a 2015 publication through AllMusic, the author of the page identified that Hamasaki's 2007 single "Together When..." sold over 3.3 million digital units worldwide, making it her highest selling single overall. Despite the song being her highest selling single overall, it is not recognised through Oricon database as her highest selling single in Japan alone. Based on their ranking, A is her highest selling single in the category (despite it being recognised as an EP), and "Seasons" is her highest selling single without any other additional recordings.)

== Promotion and live performances ==
No music videos were shot for the tracks on A, her first major release to not feature any visuals. However, in Japan, Hamasaki appeared in commercial endorsement videos that promoted each original track from A. "Trauma" and "Monochrome" were used as the official theme songs for two commercials of JT Peach Water drinks, whilst "Too Late" was the theme song for Honda Giorno Crea, and Hal's remix of "End Roll" was featured in commercial for Morinaga. The videos for each commercial appeared on several DVD compilations released by Hamasaki: A Clips (2000), a self-titled DVD, A Complete Box Set (2004), and the digital release of A Clips Complete (2014). "Trauma" and "End Roll" were included on her greatest hits compilation album A Best (2001), whilst "Monochrome" was added onto A Complete: All Singles (2008), To promote the EP, each original recording were performed on Hamasaki's first part and second part of her 2000 concert tour in Japan.

== Track listing ==
- CD single and digital download
1. "Monochrome" – 4:29
2. "Too Late" – 4:20
3. "Trauma" – 4:18
4. "End Roll" – 4:49
5. "Monochrome" (Keith Litman's Big City Vocal Mix) – 9:35
6. "Too Late" (Razor 'N Guido Remix) – 8:12
7. "Trauma" (Heavy Shuffle Mix) – 6:10
8. "End Roll" (Hal's Mix) – 4:16
9. "Monochrome" (Instrumental) – 4:29
10. "Too Late" (Instrumental) – 4:20
11. "Trauma" (Instrumental) – 4:18
12. "End Roll" (Instrumental) – 4:49
13. "End Roll" (Neuro-mantic Mix) [Bonus track] – 5:08
14. "Monochrome" (Dub's full Color Remix) [Bonus track] – 6:43
- 12" vinyl (titled A NYC)
1. "Monochrome" (Keith Litman's Big City Vocal Mix) – 9:35
2. "Too Late" (Razor 'N Guido Remix) – 8:12
- 12" vinyl (titled A TYO)
1. "Monochrome" (Keith Litman's Big City Vocal Mix) – 9:35
2. "Too Late" (Razor 'N Guido Remix) – 8:12
3. "Trauma" (Heavy Shuffle Mix) – 6:10
4. "End Roll" (Hal's Mix) – 4:16

== Personnel ==
Credits adapted from the CD liner notes of A;

=== Recording ===
- Recorded at Prime Sound Studio, Studio Sound Dali, Onkio Haus, Tokyo, Japan in 1999.

=== Credits ===
- Ayumi Hamasaki – vocals, songwriting, background vocals
- Dai Nagao – composing, programming, mastering
- Dave Ford – mixing
- Dave Way – mixing
- Hidetoshi Suzuki – electric guitar
- HΛL – composing, synthesizers, keyboards
- Jun Kajiwara – electric guitar
- Max Matsuura – production
- Naoki Hayashibe – electric guitar
- Naoto Suzuki – sound producing

== Charts ==
=== Weekly charts ===
| Chart (1999) | Peak position |
|---|---|
| Japan Weekly Chart (Oricon) | 1 |
| Japan Weekly Count Down TV Chart (TBS) | 1 |

=== Yearly chart ===
| Chart (1999) | Peak position |
|---|---|
| Japan (Oricon) | 3 |
| Japan Count Down TV (TBS) | 6 |

== Certifications and sales ==
| Region | Certification | Certified units/sales |
|---|---|---|
| Japan (RIAJ) | Million | 1,630,540 |

== Release history ==
| Region | Date | Format | Label |
|---|---|---|---|
| Japan | August 11, 1999 | CD single + colored editions | Avex Trax; Avex Entertainment Inc. |
| Hong Kong | August 11, 1999 | CD single | Avex Trax |
| Japan | October 16, 2000 | 12" vinyl (titled NYC) | Rhythm Republic |
| Japan | October 16, 2000 | 12" vinyl (titled TYO) | Rhythm Republic |
| Japan | Digital download | September 2008 (Note: There is currently insufficient evidence to determine what date Hamasaki's digital releases appeared on online retails. The closest source for iTunes Store evidence is at Jame World, whom confirmed Hamasaki's work was released worldwide on iTunes in September 2008.) | Avex Entertainment Inc. |
| Australia | Digital download | September 2008 | Avex Entertainment Inc. |
| New Zealand | Digital download | September 2008 | Avex Entertainment Inc. |
| United Kingdom | Digital download | September 2008 | Avex Entertainment Inc. |
| Ireland | Digital download | September 2008 | Avex Entertainment Inc. |
| Germany | Digital download | September 2008 | Avex Entertainment Inc. |
| Spain | Digital download | September 2008 | Avex Entertainment Inc. |
| France | Digital download | September 2008 | Avex Entertainment Inc. |
| Italy | Digital download | September 2008 | Avex Entertainment Inc. |
| Taiwan | Digital download | September 2008 | Avex Entertainment Inc. |

== See also ==
- Ayumi Hamasaki discography
- List of Oricon number-one singles of 1999
