= Wataru Takeishi =

Japanese music director

Wataru Takeishi (竹石 渉, Takeishi Wataru; born 1965) is a Japanese music video director. He has created videos for Ayumi Hamasaki and Every Little Thing.

== Music videos ==
Sorted by year, then within year sorted alphabetically.

Artist	Title	Youtube Link	Year	Notes
Every Little Thing	"Feel my Heart"	watch	1996	
Every Little Thing	"Future World"	watch	1996	
The Alfee	"Love"	watch	1996	
Every Little Thing	"Dear my Friend"	watch	1997	
Every Little Thing	"Shapes of Love"	watch	1997	
SPEED	"White Love"	watch	1997	
Ayumi Hamasaki	"Poker Face"	watch	1998	
Ayumi Hamasaki	"You"	watch	1998	
Ayumi Hamasaki	"Trust"	watch	1998	
Chisato Moritaka	"Tokyo Rush"	-	1998	
Every Little Thing	"Time Goes By"	watch	1998	
Every Little Thing	"Nesscessary"	watch	1998	
L'Arc~en~Ciel	"Dive to Blue"	-	1998	
L'Arc~en~Ciel	"Honey"	-	1998	
L'Arc~en~Ciel	"Snowdrop"	-	1998	
L'Arc~en~Ciel	"Winter Fall"	-	1998	
SPEED	"My Graduation"	watch	1998	
Yaen	"Get Down"	watch	1998	
Yaen	"Sakebi"	watch	1998	
Yaen	"Snow Blind"	-	1998	
Ayumi Hamasaki	"Appears"	watch	1999	
Ayumi Hamasaki	"Boys & Girls"	watch	1999	
Ayumi Hamasaki	"Love (Destiny)"	watch	1999	
Ayumi Hamasaki	"To Be"	watch	1999	
Ayumi Hamasaki	"Whatever"	watch	1999	
Dreams Come True	"Asa ga Mata Kuru" Tomorrow Still Comes	-	1999	
Dreams Come True	"Nante Koi Shita n' Darō" I Think I was in Some Kind of Love	-	1999	
Every Little Thing	"Over and Over"	watch	1999	
Every Little Thing	"Someday, Someplace"	watch	1999	
L'Arc~en~Ciel	"Driver's High"	-	1999	
Mariya Takeuchi	"Tenshi no Tameiki"	-	1999	
Noriyuki Makihara	"Hungry Spider"	-	1999	
SPEED	"Long Way Home"	-	1999	
Hikaru Utada	"Addicted to You"	watch	1999	
Yaen	"Be Cool!"	watch	1999	
Yaen	"Selfish"	-	1999	
Yaen	"Yozora wo Machinagara"	-	1999	
Ayumi Hamasaki	"Fly High"	watch	2000	
Ayumi Hamasaki	"Kanariya"	watch	2000	
Ayumi Hamasaki	"M"	watch	2000	
Ayumi Hamasaki	"Surreal"	watch	2000	
Ayumi Hamasaki	"Vogue"/"Far Away"/"Seasons"	watch	2000	
Every Little Thing	"Ai no Kakera" Love's Fragment	watch	2000	
Every Little Thing	"Pray"	watch	2000	
Every Little Thing	"Rescue Me"	watch	2000	
Every Little Thing	"Sure"	watch	2000	
L'Arc~en~Ciel	"Finale"	-	2000	
Hikaru Utada	"For You"	watch	2000	
Hikaru Utada	"Time Limit"	watch	2000	
Hikaru Utada	"Wait and See (Risk)"	watch	2000	
Yaen	"Chicken Guys"	-	2000	
Yaen	"First Impression"	watch	2000	
Yaen	"Taiyo no Kaseki"	-	2000	
Aya Matsuura	"Dokki Doki! Love Mail"	watch	2001	
Aya Matsuura	"Tropical Koishiteru" Tropical Loving	watch	2001	
Aya Matsuura	"Love Namidairo" Love: The Color of Tears	watch	2001	
Aya Matsuura	"100Kai no Kiss" 100th Kiss	watch	2001	
Ayumi Hamasaki	"Dearest"	watch	2001	
Ayumi Hamasaki	"Endless Sorrow"	watch	2001	
Ayumi Hamasaki	"Evolution"	watch	2001	
Ayumi Hamasaki	"Never Ever"	-	2001	
Mariya Takeuchi	"Mayonaka no Nightingale"	watch	2001	
Mariya Takeuchi	"Nostalgia"	-	2001	
Morning Musume	"Mr. Moonlight~Ai no Big Band~" Mr. Moonlight~Love's Big Band~	watch	2001	
Morning Musume	"Souda! We're Alive" That's Right! We're Alive	watch	2001	
Morning Musume	"The Peace!"	watch	2001	
Yaen	"Star"	-	2001	
Aya Matsuura	"Momoiro Katomoi" Peach-Colored Unrequited Love	watch	2002	
Aya Matsuura	"Yeah! Meccha Holiday" Yeah! Super Holiday	watch	2002	
Ayumi Hamasaki	"Daybreak"	watch	2002	
Ayumi Hamasaki	"Free & Easy"	watch	2002	
BoA	"Every Heart-Minna no Kimochi" Every Heart-Everyone's Feelings	watch	2002	
BoA	"Jewel Song"	watch	2002	
BoA	"Kiseki" Miracle	watch	2002	
BoA	"Listen to my Heart"	watch	2002	
BoA	"No. 1"	watch	2002	
BoA	"Valenti"	watch	2002	
Morning Musume	"Do It! Now"	watch	2002	
Sonim	"Curry Rice no Onna"	watch	2002	
Aya Matsuura	"Goodbye Natsuo" Goodbye Summer Boy	watch	2003	watch (wild ayaya version)
Aya Matsuura	"The Last Night"	watch	2003	watch (close up version)
Ayumi Hamasaki	"Rainbow"	watch	2003	
BoA	"Double"	watch	2003	
BoA	"Shine We Are!"	watch	2003	
Morning Musume	"As for One Day"	watch	2003	
Morning Musume	"Shabondama" Soap Bubbles	watch	2003	
Porno Graffitti	"Uzu"	-	2003	
SPEED	"Walking in the Rain"	-	2003	
Tommy February6	"Love is Forever"	-	2003	
Aya Matsuura	"Kiseki no Kaori Dance" Miraculous Fragrance Dance	watch	2004	watch (close up version)
Aya Matsuura	"Waterasebashi" Watarase Bridge	watch	2004	watch (close up version)
Ayumi Hamasaki	"Humming 7/4"	watch	2004	
L'Arc~en~Ciel	"Ready Steady Go"	-	2004	
Morning Musume	"Joshi Kashimashi Monogatari"The Story of Noisy Girls	watch	2004	
Morning Musume	"Namida ga Tomaranai Houkago" Tears That Won't Stop After School	watch	2004	
Aya Matsuura	"Zutto Suki de li Desu ka" May I Love You Fovever?	watch	2005	watch (another version)
Ayumi Hamasaki	"Fairyland"	watch	2005	
Ayumi Hamasaki	"My Name's Woman"	watch	2005	
Ayumi Hamasaki	"Heaven"	watch	2005	
BoA	"Dakishimeru" Hug	watch	2005	
Morning Musume	"Osaka Koi no Uta" Osaka Love Song	watch	2005	
Morning Musume	"The Manpower!!!"	watch	2005	watch (another version)
Ayumi Hamasaki	"Jewel"	watch	2006	
Mariya Takeuchi	"Henshin"	-	2006	
Mariya Takeuchi	"Synchronicity"	-	2006	
Morning Musume	"Ambitious! Yashinteki de li jan" Ambitious! Ambition is Good	watch	2006	
Nirgilis	"Sakura"	-	2006	
AKB48	"Bingo!"	-	2007	
Ayumi Hamasaki	"Decision"	watch	2007	
Capsule	"Jumper"	watch	2008	
Mariya Takeuchi	"Shiawase no Monosashi"	-	2008	
Hikaru Utada	"Prisoner of Love"	watch	2008	
Ayumi Hamasaki	"Sunset (Love is All)"	watch	2009	
Ayumi Hamasaki	"Sunrise (Love is All)"	watch	2009	
Nana Mizuki	"Etsuraku Camellia" Pleasure Camelia	-	2009	
Nana Mizuki	"Silent Bible"	-	2010	
Tatsuro Yamashita	"Kibō toiu Na no Hikari " In the Name of the Light of Hope	-	2010	
Ayumi Hamasaki	"Sweet Scar"	watch	2012	
Nana Mizuki	"Metro Baroque"	-	2012	
T.M. Revolution	"Vestige"	watch	2012	
AKB48	"Kiss made Countdown" Countdown to a Kiss	-	2013	
AKB48	"Soko de Inu no Unchi Funjau ka ne?" You're Gonna Step in Dog Poop Then, Aren't You?	-	2013	
AOP	"Mirai e Tsunage" Connect to the Future	-	2013	
AOP	"Never say Never"	watch (short version)	2013	
BKA48	"Haste to Waste" Haste and Waste	-	2013	
Every Little Thing	"On and On"	watch	2013	
Himari	"Sakura"	watch	2013	
NO NAME	"Kono Namida wo Kimi ni Sasagu" I Offer These Tears to You	watch (short preview)	2013	
AKB48	"Seikaku ga Warui Onna no ko" Girl with a Bad Personality	watch (short preview)	2014	
AKB48	"Kimi wa Kimagure" You Follow Your Whims	watch (short preview)	2014	
AOP	"Cosmic Magic Stars"	-	2014	
Himari	"Sakamichi~Graduation~"	watch	2014	
HKT48	"Hikaeme I Love You!" Carefully I Love You!	watch	2014	
HKT48	"Kidoku Through" Already Read Through	watch (short preview)	2014	
Mariya Takeuchi	"Shizukana Densetsu (Legend)"	watch	2014	
Miss Mary	"Tobidase Summer"	watch	2014	
Namie Amuro	"Can You Celebrate?"	watch (short preview)	2014	
AKB48	"Madonna no Sentaku" Madonna's Selection	watch (short version)	2015	
AOP	"Hanamaru Pippi wa Yoiko Dake" The Hanamaru Whistle is Only for Good Kids	-	2015	
AOP	"Stay Gold"	watch	2015	
AOP	"183 no Nihon Torebian Rock n' Roll"	watch	2015	
AOP	"Ano ne, Kimi Dake ni" Well, Just for You	watch (short version)	2016	
AOP	"Cotona Mode"	watch (short version)	2016	
AOP	"Hatsukoi Hello Chuuihou" First Love Hello Warning	-	2016	
AOP	"Kibou Traveler" Hope Traveler	watch (short version)	2016	
AOP	"Zenryoku Batankyu" Full-Force Batankyu	-	2016	
Hikaru Utada	"Hanataba o Kimi ni" A Boquet for You	watch	2016	
