= Mimosa (song) =

2025 single by Ayumi Hamasaki

Single by Ayumi Hamasaki
- Released: April 8, 2025
- Recorded: 2025
- Genre: J-pop
- Length: 5:10
- Label: Avex Trax
- Composer: Kunio Taigo
- Lyricist: Ayumi Hamasaki

Ayumi Hamasaki singles chronology
"Aurora" (2024)	"Mimosa" (2025)

Music video
- "Mimosa" on YouTube

"Mimosa" is a song by Japanese singer-songwriter Ayumi Hamasaki. It was released on April 8, 2025, through Avex Trax, and used as the theme song for the third season of the Fuji TV drama Second to Last Love.

The song peaked at number one on the Oricon Daily Digital Singles Chart upon release, and ranked at number six on the Oricon Weekly Digital Singles Chart.

== Background and release ==
In January 2025, Hamasaki confirmed she was working on new music while preparing for her then-upcoming 2025 Asia Tour. She compared working on the song to "escaping reality", admitting that at first she'd had difficulties with the track, but that "no matter how much time passes, I still love creating something by putting my all into the process."

On February 17, Hamasaki shared that the recording for the upcoming single was complete; at the end of the same month, she posted about "getting emotional" about the final mix production. "It was tough", she commented online to fans. "But in the end it was great."

In March, it was announced that the new song, "Mimosa", would be the theme song for a new season of Second to Last Love. The singer had previously recorded the gold-certified songs "How Beautiful You Are" and "Hello New Me" as the theme songs for previous seasons of the drama in 2012 and 2014 respectively. In the announcement, "Mimosa" was described as a "heartwarming" song written to encourage listeners.

"Mimosa" also marks Hamasaki's first time working on a theme song for a Fuji TV Monday 9 drama in 25 years, her last being "Seasons" for the TV show Tenkiyohou no Koibito (2000). The song was released on digital platforms on April 8, 2025.

== Writing and production ==
"Mimosa" is a mid-tempo ballad, its lyrics written by Ayumi Hamasaki. The composition is credited to Kunio Tago, who last worked with the singer on "Zutto..." (2014), and "Bye-Bye" (2024), and the arrangement to Yuta Nakano.

The song begins with Hamasaki reflecting on what she would tell her younger self: "It might sound cliché, but I would tell her, 'Your efforts will be rewarded, so everything is gonna be okay'/Because I can't forget the bitterness of the tears I cried back then". The singer then states that growing older didn't mean "everything would fall into place", and that her belief is that time itself isn't enough to heal from the past: "The truth is that time doesn't heal all wounds/All I can do is cover them with smiles".

Electric Bloom described the track as "reflective, realistic, and a little melancholic", while Bandwagon focused on highlighting its "powerful, yet gentle" melody. Hamasaki, when speaking about her inspiration for the song, commented: "Through the years, there are things that change and things that remain the same—this song reflects the sides of life that everyone experiences".

== Music video ==
The music video was released on April 14, coinciding with the start date of Second to Last Love's third season. It was directed by Muto Masashi, whose previous works include "Microphone" and "Dreamed a Dream", and shows the singer walking through a museum of her previous single and album covers. Hamasaki, who has portrayed struggling with comparisons to her past in earlier works such as "(Don't) Look Back", "Ivy", and "23rd Monster", is then met with a representation of her younger self face to face.

The concept is described as "a dialogue between her past self and present self", an official press statement highlighting the scene of "Ayu walking with a gentle smile" as she reflects on her career. Oricon News described the video as impressive and emotional, while Billboard Japan complimented the "use of technology to its fullest".

After the music video's release, Avex detailed that the "Ayu Museum" was created by CG artists, while the animated clips of previous music covers, and the representation of a younger Ayu, were generated via AI technology.

== Commercial performance ==
"Mimosa" debuted at number one on the Oricon Daily Digital Single Chart. It entered the Oricon Weekly Digital Singles Chart at number six, having sold 5,235 downloads in six days, becoming Hamasaki's first top ten hit on that chart. It then placed at number eight on its second week with sales of 4,881 downloads. The single remained inside the top ten on its third week, placing at number nine with 3,328 downloads, making it her best-selling single of the 2020s with total sales of over 13,000 units.

The track debuted at number eighty on the Billboard Japan Hot 100 on the chart dated April 23, 2025, becoming Hamasaki's first entry on the Hot 100 since "We Are the Queens" in October 2016. It peaked at number six on the Billboard Japan Top Download Songs chart upon release, and placed at number eight on its second week.

== Charts ==
=== Weekly charts ===
Weekly chart performance for "Mimosa"
Chart (2025)	Peak position
Japan (Japan Hot 100)	69
Japan (Oricon)	34
Japan Digital Singles (Oricon)	6

=== Year-end charts ===
Year-end chart performance for "Mimosa"
Chart (2025)	Position
Japan Download Songs (Billboard Japan)	49
