= I Am Ayu Tour =

2024–2025 concert tour by Ayumi Hamasaki

- Tour by Ayumi Hamasaki
- Promotional poster
- Location: Asia
- Associated album: Various
- Start date: November 1, 2024
- End date: November 23, 2025
- Legs: 2
- No. of shows: 21

Ayumi Hamasaki concert chronology
- Team Ayu Limited: Thank U Tour 2024 (2024); I Am Ayu Tour (2024–2025)

Asia Tour 2025 A: I am Ayu Ep. II
- 2025 promotional poster

The I Am Ayu Tour is the third tour of Asia by Japanese singer-songwriter Ayumi Hamasaki. It began in Shanghai on November 1, 2024. Hamasaki announced a second chapter of the tour, Asia Tour 2025 A: I am Ayu Ep. II, on January 27, 2025. Official promotion dedicated the tour to Hamasaki's twenty-fifth anniversary since debut, as well as to fans who "love her songs beyond any language barriers".

Running for over two hours, the setlist for her 2024 concerts consisted of a combination of classic hits across Hamasaki's career, as well as interlude performances from her dance troupe and string orchestra. For the final date in Tokyo, the show was adjusted for a new year countdown. In 2025, the tour was advertised to have a different setlist per country, taking into account the "history, culture, and context" of each region.

== Background and development ==
The tour was the first in sixteen years that included overseas locations, the singer holding concerts across four cities in China in addition to the two dates in Japan during the first leg of the tour. A previous attempt at international concerts, Asia Tour 2021-2022 A: 23rd Monster, was impacted by the COVID-19 pandemic; it held its final dates in December 2022, at Aichi's Nippon Gaishi Hall. Hamasaki continued to tour in Japan until her announcement of Asia Tour 2024 A: I am Ayu in August 2024, confirming a kick-off date of November 1 in Shanghai—less than a month after her previous tour, Team Ayu Limited: Thank U Tour 2024, ended.

Ticket sales were met with great demand, and pre-order queues reached up to over 100,000. Fans were covered by the media for buying swathes of advertisement space to greet the singer upon her arrival; in Shanghai, Hamasaki also broke the record for the highest attendance to a concert held at the Mercedes-Benz Arena. During a guest appearance on 2024 FNS Music Festival, Hamasaki said of the tour concept: "I want to showcase some of the beautiful things my own country has to offer, but also show understanding and appreciation for the countries I’ve been given the opportunity to perform in. That was a big focus during rehearsals." This direction was continued in the second chapter of the tour, Hamasaki commenting on her creative process regarding multiple setlists: "We're making the final adjustments to the setlists and theme, so we can perform a one and only show in each location... (Considering the) history and culture of each region, the background, what the people who live there value and love, and how they live their lives."

== Concert details ==
=== Asia Tour 2024: I Am Ayu ===
The five tour dates in China utilized a circular stage design, with two extension catwalks on opposite ends. The main stage consisted of two platforms, the inner and outer rings separated by orchestra pits. The lighting focus remained on the central stage until songs using the extension catwalks were being performed.

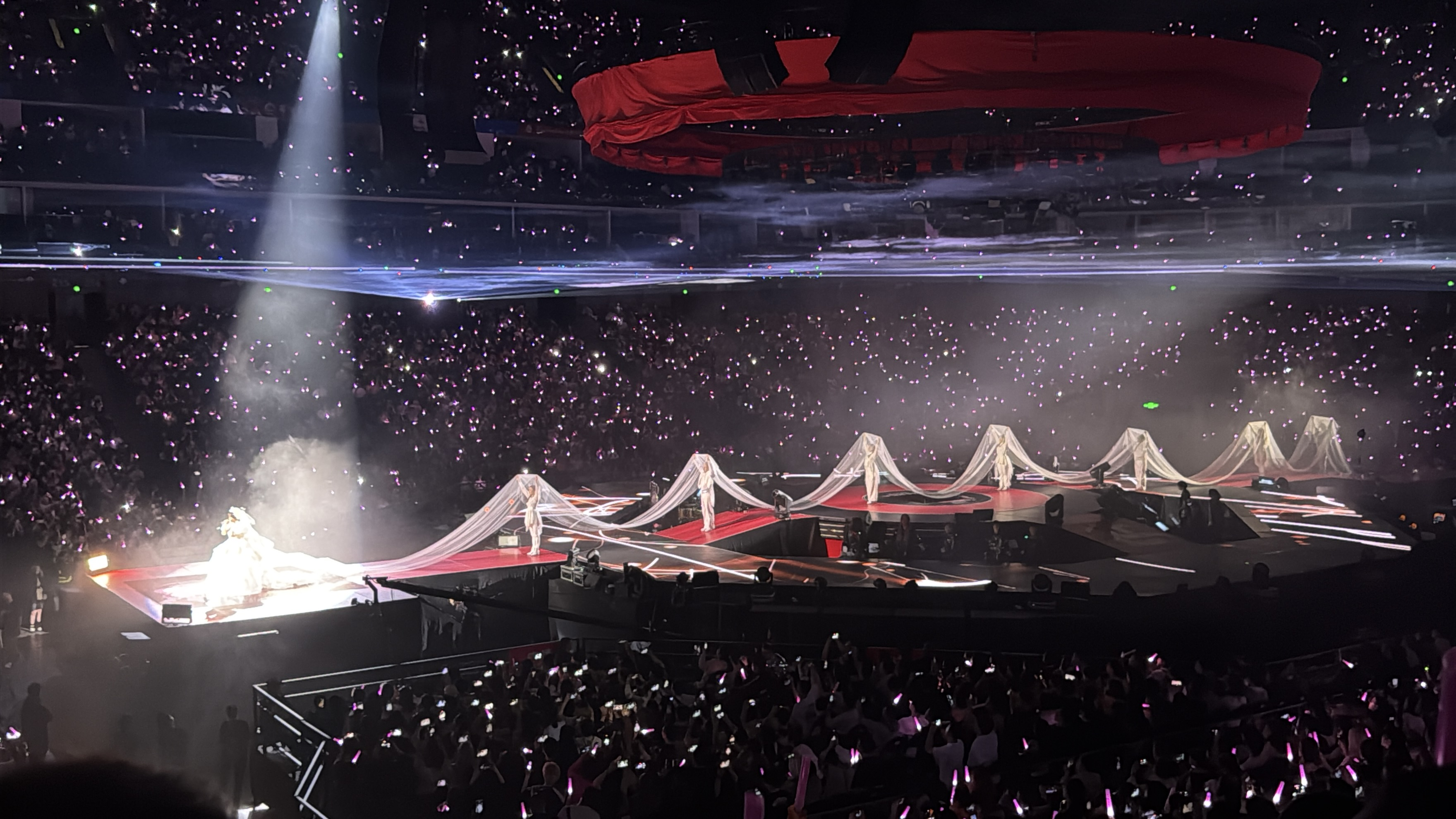
A performance of "M" in Shanghai (2.11.24)

The concerts commenced with the lifting of a red curtain from around the main stage, revealing Hamasaki alongside her orchestra and dance troupe; the singer then began a performance of a rearranged "I Am...". During the song, her dancers slowly walked around the outer ring of the stage, and plumes of smoke were released near the song's end. At the final chorus, a cross spotlight highlighted Hamasaki until the transition into "Rule".

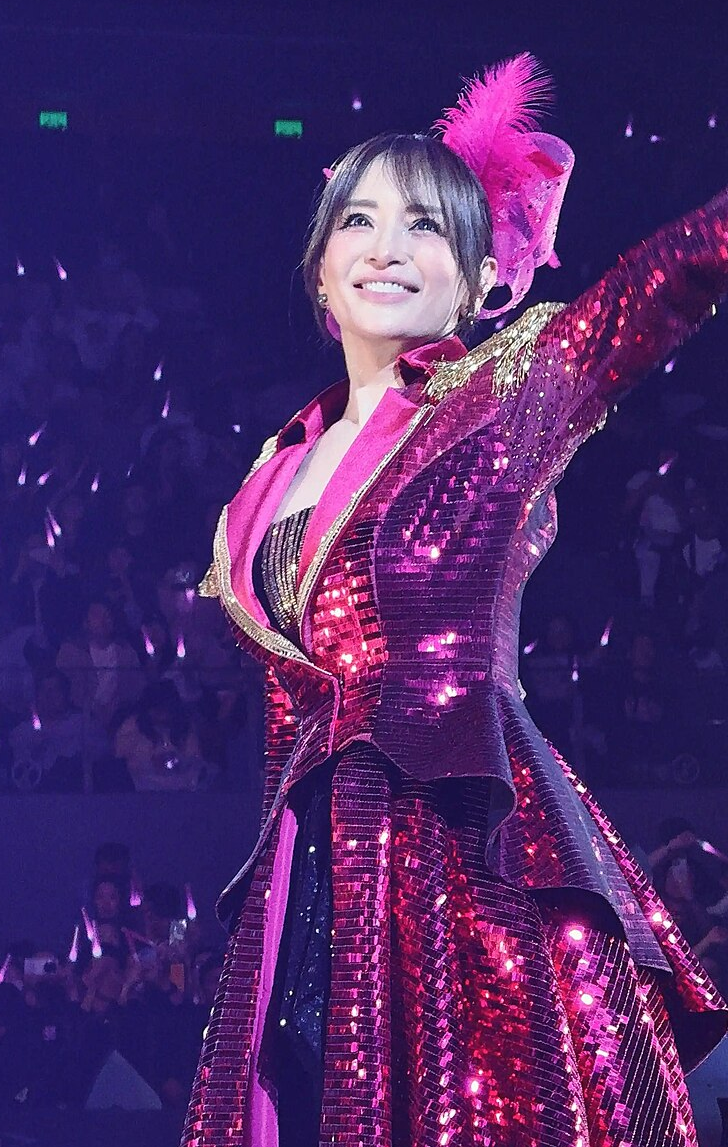
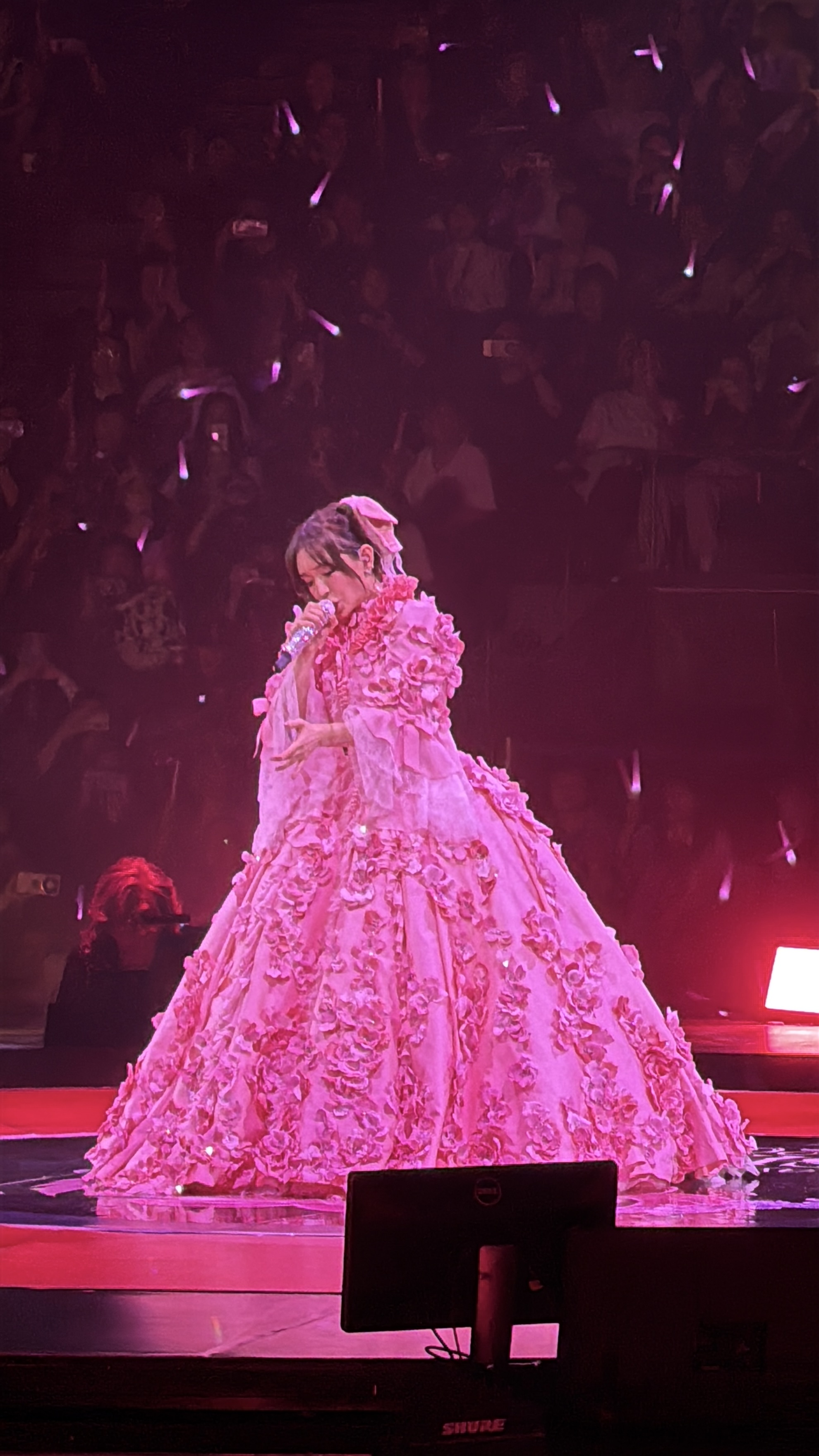
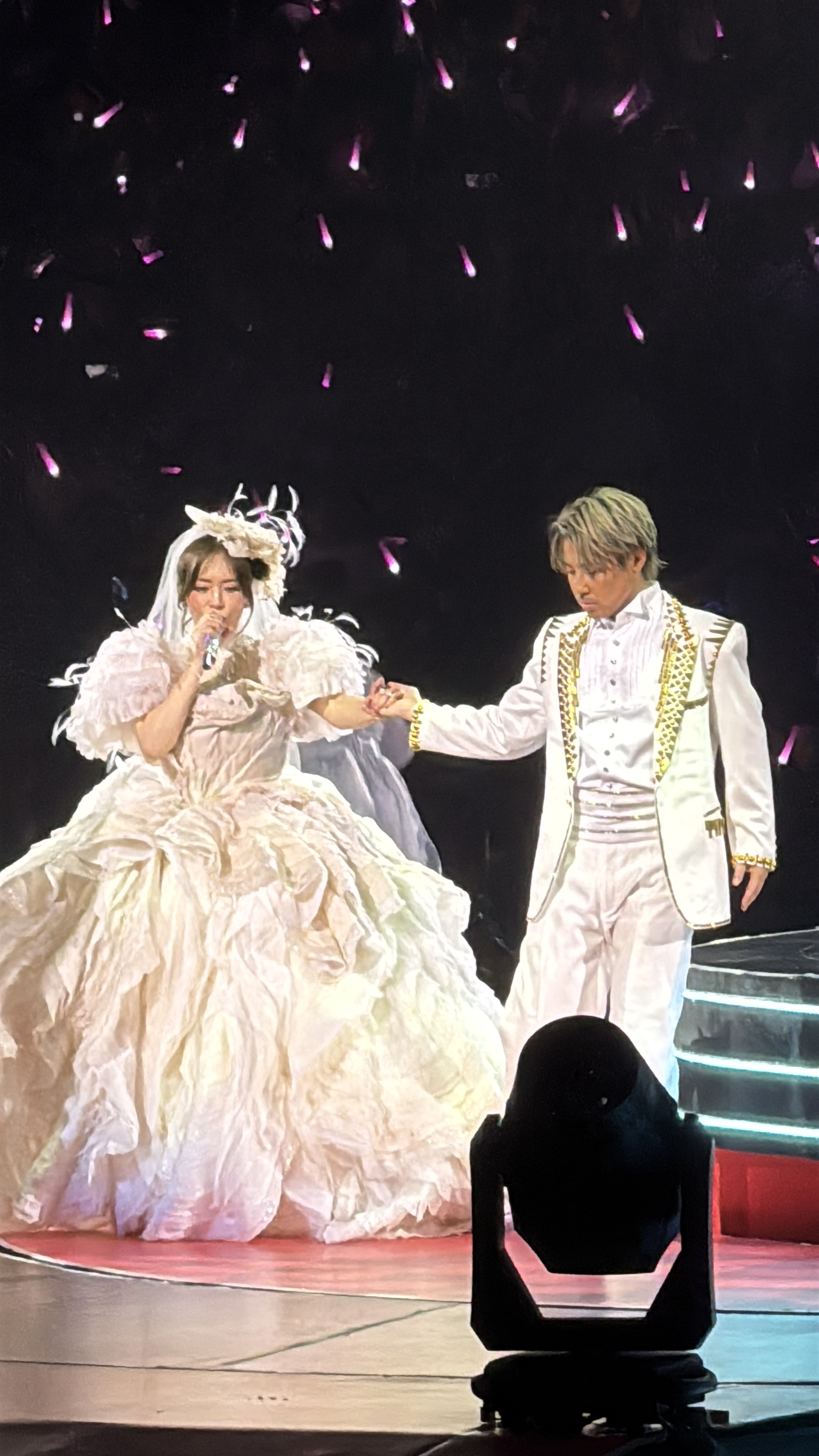
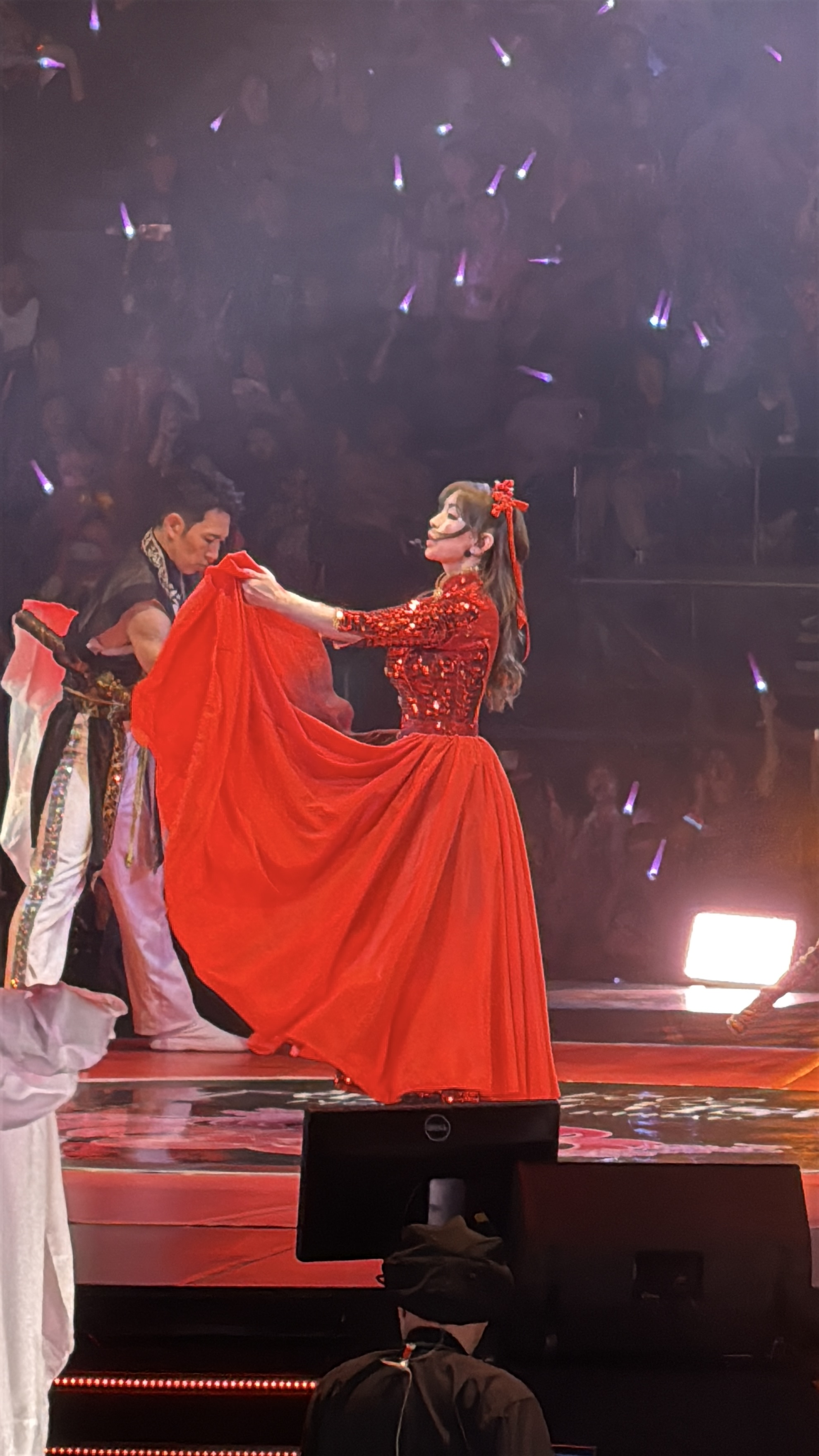
Various outfits used throughout Ayumi Hamasaki's Asia Tour 2024

The setlist was split into separate acts by interludes, the show alternating between orchestral and dance performances. In total, Hamasaki had eight costume changes between acts. In particular, the singer highlighted a white layered dress designed by Keita Maruyama, who has previously worked with Hamasaki for "Green" (2008), "Mirrorcle World" (2008), and "Ohia no Ki" (2020), as well as conceptualizing the opening outfit for the singer's Countdown Live 2022-2023 A: Remember You concert. Describing the dress as "dreamlike", Hamasaki also confessed that her biggest worry about the concert was the 50 metre-long attached veil: "The most nerve-wracking part of this Asia tour will be wearing this veil and crossing the stage from one end to the other... Please look forward to seeing that yourselves." The dress was used for the performances of "M" and "Appears", Hamasaki changing into a bedazzled blazer and long skirt combination for the next act of "Aurora", "Surreal", and "Love Song".

In total, the concerts lasted over two hours, featuring a three song encore. Commentators noted upon the singer speaking to the audience in both Japanese and English; during the final performance, Hamasaki sang the last chorus of "My All" in Mandarin Chinese, encouraging the audience to sing along to close out the concert.

Critics complimented the tour's "best selection" setlist, commentary highlighting the use of traditional instruments for track rearrangements, and the inclusion of Chinese performing arts throughout. The First Times wrote: "Hamasaki showed great respect for traditional Chinese performance art. (...) This (concert) felt worthy of Ayumi Hamasaki", while Oricon News lauded the chosen stage outfits featuring "gorgeous dresses" and "dramatic" standout designs.

=== 2025 canceled show ===
The concert scheduled in Shanghai was canceled on Friday due to "force majeure" the day before the performance, which is widely linked to the diplomatic crisis between China and Japan following remarks made by Japanese Prime Minister Sanae Takaichi. Hamasaki stated on social media that she received the notification unexpectedly on Friday morning, expressing disbelief and regret over the disruption. Later, Hamasaki publicly apologized to the affected fans and the staff members who had completed the stage setup over five days. Following the official cancellation, visual evidence posted on Hamasaki's social media accounts suggested she performed the entire concert set to the empty venue. There are also unconfirmed reports saying the concert was professionally recorded. This action was reportedly taken to preserve the planned show for her fanbase, earning praise for demonstrating exceptional professional commitment despite the circumstances.

== Tour dates ==
Asia Tour 2024: I Am Ayu
Date (2024)	City	Country	Venue	Attendance
November 1	Shanghai	China	Mercedes-Benz Arena	—
November 2	Shanghai	China	Mercedes-Benz Arena	—
November 9	Chengdu	China	Dong'an Lake Sports Park Gymnasium	—
December 7	Ningbo	China	Ningbo Olympic Sports Center	—
December 14	Guangzhou	China	Guangzhou Gymnasium	—
December 30	Tokyo	Japan	Yoyogi National Gymnasium	—
December 31	Tokyo	Japan	Yoyogi National Gymnasium	—
Total				N/A

Asia Tour 2025: I Am Ayu -ep. II-
Date (2025)	City	Country	Venue	Attendance
April 8	Funabashi	Japan	LaLa Arena Tokyo-Bay	—
June 14	Hong Kong		AsiaWorld–Arena	10,000
June 24	Nagoya	Japan	Aichi Arts Center	—
July 5	Singapore		Singapore Indoor Stadium	10,000
July 24	Tokyo	Japan	Tachikawa Stage Garden	—
July 25	Tokyo	Japan	Tachikawa Stage Garden	—
August 1	Taipei	Taiwan	Taipei Arena	26,000
August 2	Taipei	Taiwan	Taipei Arena	26,000
August 16	Hiroshima	Japan	Ueno Gakuen Hall	—
September 18	Osaka	Japan	Festival Hall	—
September 19	Osaka	Japan	Festival Hall	—
October 11	Hangzhou	China	Hangzhou Olympic Sports Centre Gymnasium	—
October 18	Sendai	Japan	Sendai Sun Plaza	—
November 1	Beijing	China	The Wukesong Arena	—
November 23	Fukuoka	Japan	Fukuoka Sunpalace	—
Total				N/A

=== Canceled show ===
Date	City	Country	Venue	Reason
November 29, 2025	Shanghai	China	Shanghai Oriental Sports Center	Force Majeure
January 10, 2026	Macao		The Venetian Arena	Voluntary Cancellation

== Set list ==
=== Asia Tour 2024: I Am Ayu ===
This set list was taken from the show in Shanghai on November 1, 2024. It does not represent all shows throughout the tour.

1. "I Am..."
2. "Rule"
3. "Evolution"

Interlude – Band Introduction

4. "Dearest"
5. "Voyage"
6. "春よ、来い (Haru yo, Koi)"
7. "Seasons"

Interlude – Ayu-mi-x Mega Mix 2024

8. "Boys & Girls"
9. "Fly High"
10. "Step You"
11. "Blue Bird"

Interlude – A Strings I

12. "Moments"
13. "Green"
14. "Jewel"

Interlude – A Strings II

15. "M"
16. "Appears"

Interlude – Dance performance

17. "Aurora"
18. "Surreal"
19. "Love Song"

Encore

20. "Teddybear"
21. "Who..."
22. "My All"

=== Asia Tour 2025: I Am Ayu Ep. II ===
This set list was taken from the show in Funabashi on April 8, 2025. It does not represent all shows throughout the tour.

1. "Inspire"
2. "Duty"
3. "Microphone"

Interlude – Fremder

4. "Vogue"
5. "Part of Me"
6. "Endless Sorrow"
7. "Free & Easy"
8. "Return Road"

Interlude – Warning

9. "About You"
10. "End of the World"
11. "Heartplace"

Interlude – Pieces of Seven

12. "Jewel"
13. "Heaven"
14. "A Song is Born"

Interlude – Kanariya

15. "Tell All"
16. "Unite!"
17. "Startin'"
18. "Talkin' 2 Myself"

Encore

19. "Boys & Girls"
20. "The Show Must Go On"

==== Alterations ====
- The second section of the concert was reworked to include "M", "Fated", and "End Roll" for overseas dates in Hong Kong, Singapore, and Taipei in place of "Vogue", "Part of Me", and "Return Road".
- "Last Minute" was performed after "End Roll" in Taipei (August 1-2).
- "Because of You" and "Game" were added after the Singapore date (July 5), replacing "End of the World" and "Heartplace".
- "A Song is Born" was only performed on April 8; it was replaced by "Voyage" for overseas dates.
- "Mimosa" was performed after the "Pieces of Seven" interlude in Nagoya (June 24) and Tokyo (July 25).
- "Mirrorcle World" replaced "Tell All" and "Unite!" in Hong Kong and Taipei (August 1).
- "Evolution" replaced "Tell All" and "Unite!" in Singapore.
- "My All" was an encore song for overseas dates.
- "Who..." was an encore song in Hong Kong and Taipei (partial acapella in Taipei, August 2).
- "Mimosa" was an encore song in Singapore.
- "Duty" was replaced with "Real Me" in Osaka (September 18-19).

== Countdown Live 2024-2025 A: I am Ayu ==
Countdown Live 2024-2025 A: I am Ayu
- Livestream concert by Ayumi Hamasaki
- Location: Japan
- Venue: Yoyogi National Gymnasium (Japan)
- Associated album: Various albums
- Date: December 31, 2024
- Duration: 140 minutes
- No. of shows: 2
- Guests: Naoya Urata
- Producers: Avex Trax

=== Background ===
On October 2, 2024—Hamasaki's 46th birthday—it was announced that the singer would hold her 22nd New Year's Eve show at Yoyogi National Gymnasium. Two concerts were announced for December 30 and 31. While the show was considered to be a part of Asia Tour 2024 A: I am Ayu, it featured an altered setlist and a new stage design.

On December 6 it was announced that the concert on December 31 would be streamed exclusively through Abema as a pay-per-view webcast. An on-demand version of the livestream was available until January 5, 2025.

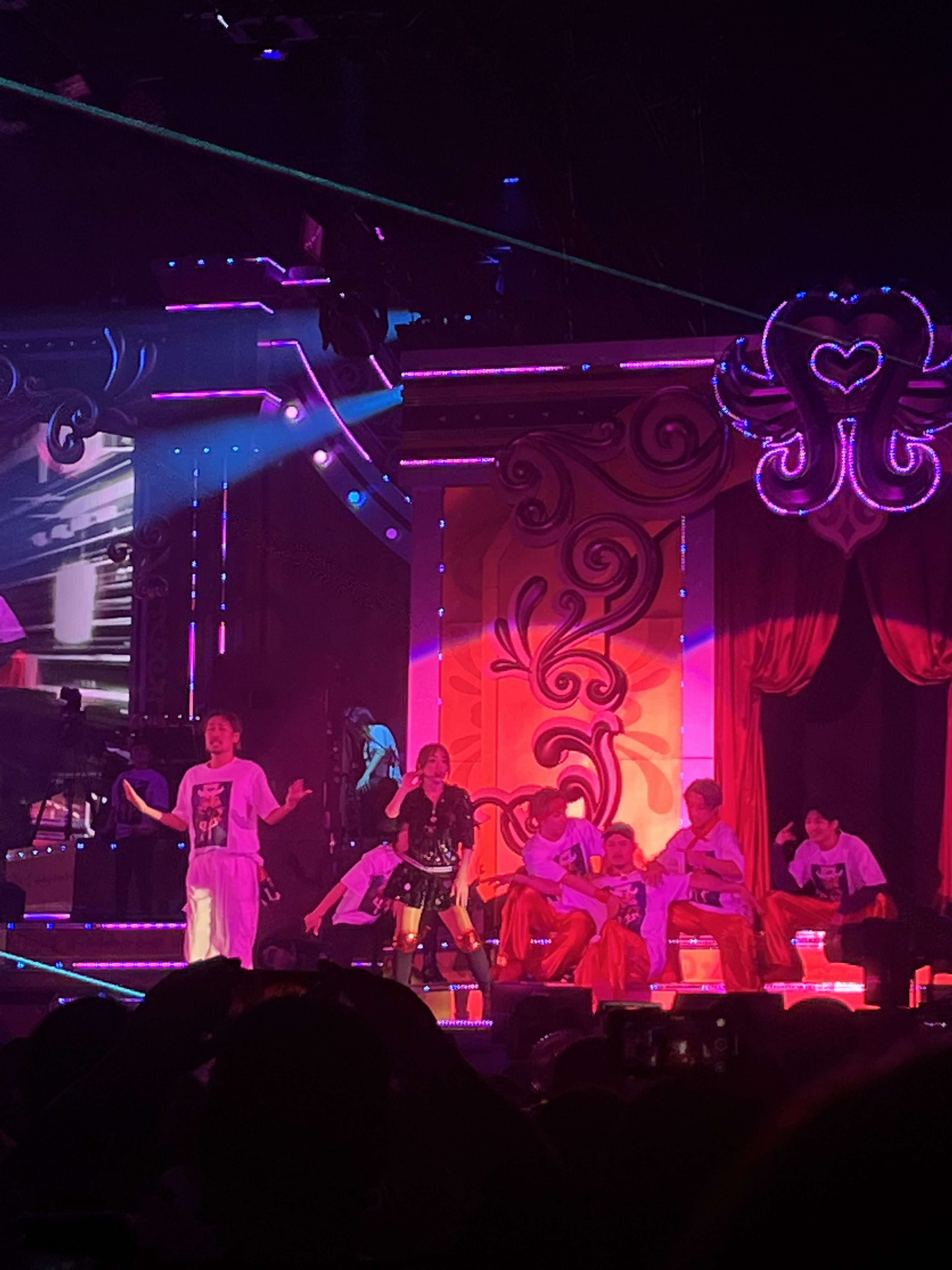
The encore of Countdown Live 2024-2025 (30.12.24)

=== Set list ===
This set list was taken from the show in Tokyo on December 31, 2024.

1. "Opening"
2. "I Am..."
3. "Rule"
4. "Evolution"

Interlude – "Task'n'bass"

5. "Fly High"
6. "Blue Bird"

Interlude – Ayu-mi-x Mega-mix (CDL 2024-2025 edition)

7. "Secret"
8. "Moments"

Interlude – "Duty (re-arranged instrumental)"

9. "Dearest"
10. "春よ、来い (Haru yo, Koi)"
11. "Seasons"
12. "Voyage"

Interlude – Instrumental Medley ("End roll" / "Depend on you")

13. "Green"
14. "Aurora"
15. "Surreal"
16. "Love Song"

Encore

17. "Dream On" (with Naoya Urata)
18. "Another Song" (with Naoya Urata)
19. "Whatever" / "Movin' on without you" / "Audience" / "Independent" / "WOW WAR TONIGHT"
20. "Boys & Girls"
21. "My All"
