= We Are the Queens (song) =

2016 single by Ayumi Hamasaki

Single by Ayumi Hamasaki

from the EP Trouble
- Released: September 30, 2016
- Recorded: 2016
- Genre: J-Pop
- Length: 5:00
- Label: Avex Trax
- Songwriter(s): Ayumi Hamasaki (lyrics); Kazuhiro Hara (music)
- Producer(s): Max Matsuura

Ayumi Hamasaki singles chronology
"Step by Step" (2015)	"We Are the Queens" (2016)	"Ohia no Ki" (2020)

"We Are the Queens" (stylized as "We are the QUEENS") is a song by Japanese singer-songwriter Ayumi Hamasaki. It was released on September 30, 2016, serving as the digital lead single from her seventh EP Trouble, released in 2018. The song was used as the theme song for the mobile game Clash of Queens, developed by Elex Wireless.

Although the song did not enter the Oricon Singles Chart, it did peak at number 79 on the Billboard Japan Hot 100 Chart.

== Background ==
On September 15, 2016 it was announced that a new digital single, entitled "We Are the Queens", would be released on September 30, 2016, as the theme song of the mobile game Clash of Queens.

== Release and promotion ==
The single was released on digital platforms on September 30, 2016.

The song was part of a tie-in with the strategy game Clash of Queens, for which Hamasaki was chosen as the spokeswoman. Additionally, from September 17 to September 30, 2016, an in-game event was held where players could get an “Ayu castle“. Hamasaki herself also appeared as a character in the game.

Commercials started airing on September 17, 2016. One of the commercials featured Hamasaki singing in front of a castle, while another one depicted her as a "race Queen".

"We Are the Queens" was also used as the opening song during the singer's Team Ayu Limited Live Tour 2016, a fanclub-only tour that began on the same day as the song's release.

== Writing and production ==
The song's lyrics were written by Hamasaki herself, with music by Kazuhiro Hara. The arrangement was handled by Yuta Nakano.

The song's lyrics were said to have been written for "all the fighting people".

== Track listing ==
=== Digital download ===
No.	Title	Length
1.	"We Are the Queens"	5:00

== Charts ==
Chart (2016)	Peak position
Billboard Japan Hot 100	79

== Personnel ==
Credits adapted from Discogs.

- Arrangement, programming – Yuta Nakano
- Guitar – Ryota Akizuki
- Lyrics – Ayumi Hamasaki
- Mixing – Naoki Yamada
- Music – Kazuhiro Hara
- Producer – Max Matsuura
- Violin – Yuko Kajitani
