= 21st Anniversary: Power of A^3 =

Ayumi Hamasaki 21st Anniversary: Power of A^3

Video by Ayumi Hamasaki
- Released: September 4, 2019
- Recorded: April 7, 2019
- Venue: Saitama Super Arena
- Genre: J-pop
- Label: Avex

Ayumi Hamasaki chronology
Ayumi Hamasaki Just the Beginning 20 Tour 2017 (2018)	Ayumi Hamasaki 21st Anniversary: Power of A^3 (2019)	Ayumi Hamasaki Countdown Live 2019–2020: Promised Land A (2020)

Ayumi Hamasaki 21st Anniversary: Power of A^3 is Japanese pop singer Ayumi Hamasaki's 42nd video release. It was released on September 4, 2019. The concert was a special live that was held twice at Saitama Super Arena on April 6 and 7, 2019 to close out her 21st anniversary year.

The DVD peaked at No. 2 on the weekly Oricon DVD Chart, while the Blu-ray reached No. 7.

While Hamasaki had gone on a variety of concert tours following her Arena Tour 2016, this marks her first standalone release of a concert in 3 years.

== Release ==
The performance on April 7, 2019, was recorded for the release, which came out in four versions. The different formats include a DVD version, a Blu-ray version, a DVD + Goods + Sumapura version and a Blu-ray + Goods + Sumapura version. The latter two were limited TeamAyu/mu-mo editions, which included a special bonus bag.

== Track list ==
Track list taken from Avex.

=== DVD/Blu-ray ===
DVD/Blu-ray: Ayumi Hamasaki 21st Anniversary: Power of A^3
No.	Title	Length
1.	"Opening"
2.	"Duty"
3.	"Microphone"
4.	"Let's Get Down"
5.	"Startin'"
6.	"Step You"
7.	"It's Showtime"
8.	"Sparkle" / "Summer Love" / "Movin' on without you" / "NaNaNa" / "Rollin'" / "Ladies Night" / "Sparkle"
9.	"Walking Proud"
10.	"Part of Me"
11.	"Kagome"
12.	"Brillante"
13.	"Flower"
14.	"Heaven"
15.	"Surreal" / "Evolution" / "Surreal"
16.	"Bold & Delicious"
17.	"Born to Be..."
18.	"You & Me" / "Audience" / "Boys & Girls"
19.	"Who..."

== Charts ==
Release	Chart	Peak position
September 4, 2019	Oricon DVD Chart (General)	2
September 4, 2019	Oricon Blu-ray Chart (General)	7
