= Ayumi Hamasaki 15th Anniversary Tour: A Best Live =

Video by Ayumi Hamasaki
- Released: October 30, 2013
- Recorded: July 28, 2013
- Venue: Yoyogi National Gymnasium
- Genre: J-pop
- Label: Avex

Ayumi Hamasaki chronology
| Ayumi Hamasaki Countdown Live 2012–2013 A: Wake Up (2013) | Ayumi Hamasaki 15th Anniversary Tour: A Best Live (2013) | Ayumi Hamasaki Countdown Live 2013-2014 A (2014) |

Ayumi Hamasaki 15th Anniversary Tour: A Best Live is Japanese pop singer Ayumi Hamasaki's 36th DVD/Blu-ray release. It was released on October 30, 2013. The tour was held to celebrate Hamasaki's 15th anniversary in the music industry, with her performing 28 shows in Japan from mid-April to late July. The tour started on April 13, 2013 at Saitama Super Arena and finished with two final shows at Yoyogi National Gymnasium on July 27 and 28, 2013.

The DVD peaked at No. 3 on the weekly Oricon DVD Chart, with the Blu-ray reaching No. 3, as well.

== Release ==
The DVD/Blu-ray was released in four formats, the first two being a standard 2DVD version and the Blu-ray version. The other two formats are the limited 2DVD + Live Photobook and the Blu-ray + Live Photobook version. The photobook includes 88 pages.

== Track list ==
Track list taken from Avex.

Disc 1

1. "interlude"
2. "A Song for ××"
3. "Memorial Address"
4. "Massive Trance Station"
5. "Poker Face"
6. "Fly High"
7. "Honey"
8. "Show Time"
9. "M"
10. "No Way to Say"
11. "You & Me"
12. "Blue Bird"
13. "innervisions
14. "Jewel"
15. "Heaven"
16. "Ever Free"
17. "Wake Me Up"
18. "Tell All"
19. "Surreal" ～ "Evolution" ～ "Surreal"
20. "Voyage"
  Encore
21. "Teddy Bear"
22. "Sunrise (Love Is All)"
23. "Boys & Girls"
24. "Who..."
  Double Encore
25. "My All"

Disc 2

1. Screen Videos (2 titles)

== Charts ==
| Release | Chart | Peak position |
|---|---|---|
| October 30, 2013 | Oricon DVD Chart (General) | 3 |
| October 30, 2013 | Oricon Blu-ray Chart (General) | 3 |
