= Countdown Live 2019–2020: Promised Land A =

Ayumi Hamasaki Countdown Live 2019–2020: Promised Land A

Video by Ayumi Hamasaki
- Released: August 26, 2020
- Recorded: December 31, 2019
- Venue: Yoyogi National Gymnasium
- Genre: J-pop
- Label: Avex

Ayumi Hamasaki chronology
Ayumi Hamasaki 21st Anniversary: Power of A^3 (2019)	Ayumi Hamasaki Countdown Live 2019–2020: Promised Land A (2020)	Trouble Tour 2020 A: Saigo no Trouble – Final (2021)

Ayumi Hamasaki Countdown Live 2019–2020: Promised Land A is Japanese pop singer Ayumi Hamasaki's 16th Countdown concert DVD. It was released on August 26, 2020. Hamasaki performed this concert only once at the Yoyogi National Gymnasium on December 31, 2019.

Upon release, the DVD peaked at No. 6 on the weekly Oricon DVD Chart, while the Blu-ray reached No. 9. By the end of 2020, the DVD version reached No. 96 on the Oricon Yearly Music DVD Chart. In addition, it sold a total of 11,543 copies with 6,973 DVD versions and 4,570 Blu-ray versions being sold.

It was released in four formats: a DVD version, a Blu-ray version, a DVD+2CD+Goods version and a Blu-ray+2CD+Goods version. The latter two are limited TeamAyu/mu-mo editions, which include a physical CD version of the songs "Ohia no Ki" and "Dreamed a Dream".

== Background information ==
This was Hamasaki's first New Year's Eve concert to be performed at the Yoyogi National Gymnasium in 3 years. She had previously performed all of her countdown live concerts there from 2000 until 2016.

The DVD/Blu-ray release makes this her first countdown live to receive a standalone release in 5 years, after having released Ayumi Hamasaki Countdown Live 2014–2015 A: Cirque de Minuit on April 8, 2015. Those who ordered the limited edition of the release were able to access an online preview of the concert.

Additionally, this marks Hamasaki's first concert after giving birth in November of the same year.

== Release ==
The concert was released on August 26, 2020 in four different formats. The first two are a standard DVD version and Blu-ray version. The other two formats are a DVD+2CD+Goods version and a Blu-ray+2CD+Goods version. The latter two versions are limited editions that can only be bought through TeamAyu or Mu-mo.

The limited edition comes in a deluxe jacket case and will include two CDs – a live album of the concert and a physical copy of Hamasaki's latest singles "Ohia no Ki" and "Dreamed a Dream", which were released digitally on July 5, and July 31, 2020. Additionally, the limited edition also includes an aurora tote bag which is decorated in a monogram pattern. The bag comes with two carrying handles and features Hamasaki's signature "A" logo, as well as the concert's logo.

== Track listing ==
DVD/Blu-ray: Ayumi Hamasaki Countdown Live 2019–2020: Promised Land A
No.	Title	Length
1.	"Labyrinth"
2.	"The Judgement Day"
3.	"Happening Here"
4.	"Fly High"
5.	"Unite!"
6.	"Starting Over"
7.	"Get In Gear!"
8.	"Snowy Kiss"
9.	"Sending Mail"
10.	"Missing"
11.	"Sakura"
12.	"Marionette -prelude-"
13.	"Marionette"
14.	"Ayu-ro Mega-Mix"
15.	"Identity"
16.	"Decision"
17.	"Warning"
18.	"How Beautiful You Are"
19.	"Song 4 U"
20.	"Evolution"
21.	"Mirrorcle World"
22.	"Love Song"
23.	"Teens - Acoustic version"
24.	"Trauma" / "Audience" / "Everywhere Nowhere" / "Flower Garden" / "Humming 7/4"
25.	"Boys & Girls"
26.	"My All"
27.	"Until That Day..."

DVD/Blu-ray: Ayumi Hamasaki Countdown Live 2019–2020: Promised Land A
No.	Title	Length
1.	"Labyrinth"
2.	"The Judgement Day"
3.	"Happening Here"
4.	"Fly High"
5.	"Unite!"
6.	"Starting Over"
7.	"Get In Gear!"
8.	"Snowy Kiss"
9.	"Sending Mail"
10.	"Missing"
11.	"Sakura"
12.	"Marionette -prelude-"
13.	"Marionette"
14.	"Ayu-ro Mega-Mix"
15.	"Identity"
16.	"Decision"
17.	"Warning"
18.	"How Beautiful You Are"
19.	"Song 4 U"
20.	"Evolution"
21.	"Mirrorcle World"
22.	"Love Song"
23.	"Teens - Acoustic version"
24.	"Trauma" / "Audience" / "Everywhere Nowhere" / "Flower Garden" / "Humming 7/4"
25.	"Boys & Girls"
26.	"My All"
27.	"Until That Day..."

CD1: Live CD
No.	Title	Length
1.	"Happening Here"
2.	"Fly High"
3.	"Unite!"
4.	"Snowy Kiss"
5.	"Sending Mail"
6.	"Missing"
7.	"Sakura"
8.	"Warning"
9.	"How Beautiful You Are"
10.	"Song 4 U"
11.	"Evolution"
12.	"Teens - Acoustic version"
13.	"Until That Day..."

CD2: Single
No.	Title	Length
1.	"Ohia no Ki"	04:36
2.	"Dreamed a Dream"	04:32
3.	"Ohia no Ki (Instrumental)"	04:36
4.	"Dreamed a Dream (Instrumental)"	04:32
Total length:		18:16

== Charts ==
Release	Chart	Peak position
August 26, 2020	Oricon DVD Chart (General)	6
August 26, 2020	Oricon Music DVD Chart	4
August 26, 2020	Oricon Blu-ray Chart (General)	9
August 26, 2020	Oricon Music Blu-ray Chart	3
August 26, 2020	Oricon Music DVD/Blu-ray Chart	3
August 26, 2020	Oricon Yearly Music DVD Chart	96
