= Ayumi Hamasaki Dome Tour 2001 A =

Video by Ayumi Hamasaki
- Released: December 12, 2001
- Genre: J-pop

Ayumi Hamasaki chronology
Ayumi Hamasaki Countdown Live 2000–2001 A (2001)	Ayumi Hamasaki Dome Tour 2001 A (2001)	Ayumi Hamasaki Countdown Live 2001–2002 A (2003)

Ayumi Hamasaki's Dome Live Tour 2001 A DVD was released on December 12, 2001.

== Track listing ==
1. evolution
2. Fly high
3. Duty
4. NEVER EVER
5. M
6. A Song for XX
7. SURREAL
8. vogue
9. AUDIENCE
10. SEASONS
11. Endless sorrow

=== Encore ===
1. UNITE!
2. Trauma
3. Boys & Girls
4. Who...

== Tour dates ==
Date	City	Country	Venue
June 22, 2001	Fukuoka	Japan	Fukuoka Dome
June 23, 2001	Fukuoka	Japan	Fukuoka Dome
June 26, 2001	Nagoya	Japan	Nagoya Dome
June 27, 2001	Nagoya	Japan	Nagoya Dome
June 30, 2001	Osaka	Japan	Osaka Dome
July 1, 2001	Osaka	Japan	Osaka Dome
July 6, 2001	Tokyo	Japan	Tokyo Dome
July 7, 2001	Tokyo	Japan	Tokyo Dome
