= Jidai (Miyuki Nakajima song) =

1975 song by Miyuki Nakajima

Single by Miyuki Nakajima

from the album Watashi no Koe ga Kikoemasuka
- B-side: "Kizutsuita Tsubasa"
- Released: December 21, 1975
- Genre: New Music
- Length: 9:08
- Label: Canyon
- Songwriter: Nakajima

Miyuki Nakajima singles chronology
"Azami Jō no Lullaby" (1975)	"Jidai" (1975)	"Konbanwa" (1976)

"Jidai" (時代) is a 1975 song by Japanese singer-songwriter Miyuki Nakajima. It was used as the official theme song of the Osaka Expo, and won the grand prize at the World Popular Song Festival in November 1975. It was released as a single in December 1975 and sold over 2 million copies. In 1993, it was redubbed for release in Jidai: Time Goes Around, and in 2007 it was included in the Nihon no Uta Hyakusen.

A cover was released by Hiroko Yakushimaru in 1988, and in 2008 it was translated and sang by Hayley Westenra. An instrumental version was used in Leiji Matsumoto's series Cosmo Warrior Zero (2001).

== Ayumi Hamasaki version ==
"Jidai"

Single by Ayumi Hamasaki
- Released: March 25, 2024
- Genre: J-pop
- Length: 4:51
- Label: Avex

Ayumi Hamasaki singles chronology
"Mask" (2022)	"Jidai" (2024)	"Bye-Bye" (2024)

Singer-songwriter Ayumi Hamasaki initially mentioned working on new music at the beginning of 2024, going on to write about feeling "nervous" about a recording session, for "a song that's simply too great". A few weeks later, it was announced that she would be covering "Jidai". It was released as a digital single on March 25.

Upon the song's release, Hamasaki paid tribute to the original track, stating "I worked with the best staff and musicians to produce this song, paying due respect to Nakajima Miyuki's great masterpiece. I expressed myself the best I could."

The track was used as the theme song for Banpaku no Taiyo, a TV-drama based in 1970s Japan. Actress Kanna Hashimoto starred as heroine Asano Kyoko, the show following her journey working for the Osaka Expo and her goal to connect people from all over the world; it is described by critics as a "heartwarming" drama focused on celebrating the history of the era. When asked about the show, Hamasaki commented "I agreed to sing the theme song because I empathized with the world view depicted in this drama, especially the story of the main characters, who continue to pursue their dreams in an era when women's advancement in society was not recognized at all."

=== Critical reception ===
Critics complimented Hamasaki's interpretation, comparing its production and quality to her previous covers of Yumi Matsutoya's "Sotsugyou Shashin" and "Haru yo, koi". "(Hamasaki) brings out the charm in every song" Sponichi said in its coverage, while another critic compared it to Hamasaki's previous hit song "Seasons": "Listening to (Jidai), I remember how much I love Hamasaki's singing voice." Other commentary was similarly positive, the release being met with reported responses of "It's a song that has been covered by hundreds of artists, so why does Ayu's voice pierce my heart so much?" and "Ayu is the epitome of this generation".

The song debuted at number one on the Oricon Daily Digital Single Chart, and placed at number thirty-one on the Oricon Weekly Digital Singles Chart with 1,790 downloads.

== See also ==
- 1975 in Japanese music
