= Ayumi Hamasaki Countdown Live 2012–2013 A: Wake Up =

Ayumi Hamasaki Countdown Live 2012-2013 A: Wake Up

Video by Ayumi Hamasaki
- Released: April 08, 2013
- Recorded: December 31, 2012
- Venue: Yoyogi National Gymnasium
- Genre: J-pop
- Label: Avex

Ayumi Hamasaki chronology
Ayumi Hamasaki Arena Tour 2012 A: Hotel Love Songs (2012)	Ayumi Hamasaki Countdown Live 2012-2013 A: Wake Up (2013)	Ayumi Hamasaki 15th Anniversary Tour: A Best Live (2013)

Ayumi Hamasaki Countdown Live 2012–2013 A: Wake Up is Japanese pop singer Ayumi Hamasaki's 12th Countdown concert DVD. It was released on April 08, 2013. Hamasaki performed three dates at the Yoyogi National Gymnasium for this countdown, on December 29, 30 and 31, 2012.

The DVD/Blu-ray includes the first ever live performances of songs such as Wake Me Up, Snowy Kiss and Missing. All three songs were included one month later on Hamasaki's 14th studio album Love Again (2013).

== Track list ==
Track list taken from Avex.

1. Wake Me Up
2. Rule
3. Disco-munication
4. Beautiful Fighters
5. Fly High
6. Snowy Kiss
7. Missing
8. Together When...
9. Everywhere Nowhere
10. You & Me
11. Song 4 u
12. Who...
13. Humming7/4
14. Evolution ～ Surreal
15. Until That Day...
  Encore
16. Trauma
17. Audience
18. Boys & Girls
19. My All

== Sales ==
DVD: 18,888

Blu-ray: 5,911
