= Ayumi Hamasaki Arena Tour 2012 A: Hotel Love Songs =

Video by Ayumi Hamasaki
- Released: March 8, 2013
- Recorded: October 11, 2012
- Venue: Yoyogi National Stadium
- Genre: J-pop
- Label: Avex Trax

Ayumi Hamasaki chronology
Ayumi Hamasaki Countdown Live 2011–2012 A: Hotel Love Songs (2012)	Ayumi Hamasaki Arena Tour 2012 A: Hotel Love Songs (2013)	Ayumi Hamasaki Countdown Live 2012–2013 A: Wake Up (2013)

Ayumi Hamasaki Arena Tour 2012 A: Hotel Love Songs is Japanese pop singer Ayumi Hamasaki's 34rd live DVD/Blu-ray release of the tour of the same name. It started on April 7, 2012 at Saitama Super Arena, ending with additional performances on October 11, 2012 at Yoyogi National Gymnasium.

== Track list ==
From Mantanweb.

1. "Happening Here"
2. "Song 4 U"
3. "Feedback" (Interlude)
4. "Tell Me Why"
5. "Reminds Me"
6. "Appears"
7. "Missing"
8. "A Cup of Tea"
9. "Shake It"
10. "Step You"
11. "NaNaNa"
12. "Sparkle"
13. "The Next Love"
14. "Eyes, Smoke, Magic"
15. "Kiss o' Kill"
16. "Serenade in A Minor"
17. "Ladies Night"
18. "Party Queen"
19. "Surreal" – "Evolution" – "Surreal"
20. "Love Song"
  Encore
21. "One Night Carnival"
22. "Boys & Girls"
23. "How Beautiful You Are"
24. "Thank U"
