= Bye-Bye (Ayumi Hamasaki song) =

2021 single by Ayumi Hamasaki

Single by Ayumi Hamasaki
- Released: April 8, 2024
- Recorded: 2024
- Genre: J-pop; R&B
- Length: 3:22
- Label: Avex Trax
- Composer: Kunio Tago
- Lyricist: Ayumi Hamasaki

Ayumi Hamasaki singles chronology
"Jidai" (2024)	"Bye-Bye" (2024)	"Aurora" (2024)

Music video
- "Bye-Bye" on YouTube

"Bye-Bye" is a song by Japanese singer-songwriter Ayumi Hamasaki. It was released on April 8, 2024, through Avex Trax, and used as the April-May 2024 theme for Minna no Uta.

The song peaked at number four on the Oricon Daily Digital Singles Chart upon release, and ranked at number twenty-five on the Oricon Weekly Digital Singles Chart.

== Writing and production ==
Hamasaki worked with Kunio Tago on the single; Tago has previously worked with the artist on songs such as "Scar", "Days", and "Zutto...", and is also known for working with Ko Shibasaki and Every Little Thing. The arrangement was done by Tasuku.

When the song released, Hamasaki spoke about her worries about being able to write appropriately for the family-oriented Minna no Uta. "I was unsure about whether it would be okay for me to go all out," the singer stated, adding that the process went smoother after staff told her to go about writing as usual: "I was told to go ahead with creating my usual 'Hamasaki world'. I was able to throw away my doubts".

The song itself is described as a "2000s-inspired" R&B dance number, Hamasaki quoting traditional Japanese nursery rhymes throughout the lyrics.

== Cover art ==
The cover art is credited to Masayuki Kamo, who also worked on Remember You and "Haru yo, koi" as the primary photographer. In the photo, Hamasaki stands in a traditional schoolgirl outfit, looking directly at the viewer in front of a pile of school chairs.

== Music video ==
The music video, directed by Hideaki Sunaga, was released on April 8. It is set in an abandoned school hall filled with the school chairs seen in the cover art. Hamasaki, her dance troupe, and a group of child actors sit at desks in an otherwise dark, empty space before the video transitions to them all holding hands in a circle. The video continues to switch between moments of them writing, to everyone slowly circling the singer; one of these transitions is to a dance break with more traditional stage choreography. The video ends with the chairs piled up behind Hamasaki, the dancers absent from the final shot as she stares into the camera.

The First Times quoted online feedback describing the video as "dark and mysterious", as well as compliments on the "addictive" choreography. A music video for Minna no Uta was also produced, created by artist Mana Inouye.

== Promotion ==
"Bye-Bye" was used as the April-May 2024 theme song for Minna no Uta, and was performed live during Hamasaki's Team Ayu Limited: Thank U Tour 2024 tour. It was also promoted as an anniversary track, marking 26 years since Hamasaki's debut.

== Charts ==
Chart (2024)	Peak position
Oricon Weekly Digital Singles Chart	25
Billboard Japan Download Songs	27
