= Ayumi Hamasaki Countdown Live 2011–2012 A: Hotel Love Songs =

Video by Ayumi Hamasaki
- Released: March 21, 2012
- Genre: J-pop
- Label: Avex

Ayumi Hamasaki chronology
Ayumi Hamasaki Power of Music 2011 A (2012)	Ayumi Hamasaki Countdown Live 2011–2012 A: Hotel Love Songs (2012)	Ayumi Hamasaki Arena Tour 2012 A: Hotel Love Songs (2012)

Ayumi Hamasaki Countdown Live 2011–2012 A: Hotel Love Songs is Japanese pop singer Ayumi Hamasaki's 11th Countdown concert DVD.

== Track list ==
1. do it again
2. Happening Here
3. insomnia
4. MOON
5. fated
6. feedback
7. NEVER EVER
8. sending mail
9. machine
10. Sparkle
11. Humming 7/4
12. evolution
13. RAINBOW
14. November
15. music
16. Ladies Night
17. Party queen
18. Happening Here
19. Love song
20. how beautiful you are
21. Trauma ～ Boys & Girls
22. MY ALL
