= Trouble Tour 2020 A: Saigo no Trouble – Final =

Ayumi Hamasaki Trouble Tour 2020 A: Saigo no Trouble – Final

Video by Ayumi Hamasaki
- Released: January 27, 2021
- Recorded: October 2, 2020
- Genre: J-pop
- Length: 2:14:22
- Label: Avex

Ayumi Hamasaki chronology
Ayumi Hamasaki Countdown Live 2019–2020: Promised Land A (2020)	Ayumi Hamasaki Trouble Tour 2020 A: Saigo no Trouble – Final (2021)

Ayumi Hamasaki Trouble Tour 2020 A: Saigo no Trouble – Final is Japanese pop singer Ayumi Hamasaki's 45th video release. It was released on January 27, 2021.

The concert was a special online live event that was held on October 2, 2020 – Hamasaki's 42nd birthday – and streamed through Mu-mo, serving as the final concert of her Trouble Tour 2020 A: Saigo no Trouble.

== Background ==
The concert was the finale of the Trouble Tour, which had to be put on hold and was eventually cancelled as a result of the ongoing COVID-19 pandemic, after 65 performances from 2018 to 2020. A total of 35 performances had to be cancelled, which resulted in the show being reconstructed for the online live event. The show features first-time performances of songs such as "It Was" and "Bye-bye Darling".

== Release ==
The concert was released in two formats: a standard DVD version and the Blu-ray version. Both versions include a 40-page photobook.

The live-streamed version had previously been available for a week after the performance on Mu-mo, until October 9, 2020, as a video on demand.

== Track listing ==
DVD/Blu-ray: Ayumi Hamasaki Trouble Tour 2020 A: Saigo no Trouble – Final
No.	Title	Length
1.	"Labyrinth"
2.	"Whatever"
3.	"And Then"
4.	"Many Classic Moments"
5.	"Jump!"
6.	"This Side of Me"
7.	"Bye-Bye Darling"
8.	"Powder Snow"
9.	"It Was"
10.	"Ayu-ro Mega-Mix"
11.	"Shake It"
12.	"Lelio"
13.	"Jewel"
14.	"Mad World"
15.	"Catcher In The Light (tsk rmx)"
16.	"Talkin' 2 Myself"
17.	"We Wish"
18.	"Signal"
19.	"Tell All"
20.	"Love Song"
21.	"Independent"
22.	"Trauma" / "Audience" / "Flower Garden"
23.	"Boys & Girls"
24.	"Winding Road"
25.	"My All"
Total length:		2:14:22

== Charts ==
Release	Chart	Peak position
January 27, 2021	Oricon DVD Chart (General)	4
January 27, 2021	Oricon Blu-ray Chart (General)	15
