= Ayumi Hamasaki Countdown Live 2001–2002 A =

Video by Ayumi Hamasaki
- Released: 2003
- Recorded: 2001–2002
- Genre: J-pop

Ayumi Hamasaki chronology
Ayumi Hamasaki Dome Tour 2001 A (2001)	Ayumi Hamasaki Countdown Live 2001–2002 A (2003)	Ayumi Hamasaki Arena Tour 2002 A (2003)

Ayumi Hamasaki's Countdown Live 2001–2002 A, a New Year's Eve show, was released in the Complete Live Box DVD.

== Track listing ==
1. M (not included on the DVD)
2. opening Run
3. Connected
4. UNITE!
5. SURREAL
6. A Song for XX (not included on DVD)
7. NEVER EVER
8. Fly high
9. Boys & Girls
10. evolution
11. A Song is born
12. Daybreak (not included on DVD)
13. AUDIENCE
14. Dearest

=== Encore ===
1. Trauma (not included on DVD)
2. flower garden (not included on DVD)
3. Endless sorrow 〜gone with the wind ver.〜
