= Aurora (Ayumi Hamasaki song) =

2024 single by Ayumi Hamasaki

Single by Ayumi Hamasaki
- Released: May 21, 2024
- Recorded: 2024
- Genre: J-pop
- Length: 4:37
- Label: Avex Trax
- Composer: Kazuhiro Hara
- Lyricist: Ayumi Hamasaki

Ayumi Hamasaki singles chronology
| "Bye-Bye" (2024) | "Aurora" (2024) | "Mimosa" (2025) |

Music video
- "Aurora" on YouTube

"Aurora" is a song by Japanese singer-songwriter Ayumi Hamasaki. It received an exclusive Bilibili release on May 21, 2024, and was released worldwide on June 26. It was used as the official theme for Azur Lane's 7th anniversary.

== Writing and production ==
Upon the song's announcement, Hamasaki referred to the song as being inspired by the idea of "taking a journey together", linking it to her own 26th anniversary as well as to Azur Lane's celebrations: "We may face many difficult and dangerous challenges on our way, but we are able to conquer them together, and be greeted by the beautiful aurora waiting for us at the end." After the song's international release the next month, the artist also dedicated the song to Team Ayu.

The song uses a composition by Kazuhiro Hara, whose other recent works with Hamasaki include "Just the Way You Are" and "23rd Monster". Yuta Nakano arranged the track; an often-used collaborator of the singer since her early career. It is described as a medium-tempo rock number with a "conventional opening", although Billboard Japan praised Hamasaki for being able to convey her typical "earnest tension" by the song's end.

== Cover art ==
The cover art is credited to Masayuki Kamo, who also worked on Remember You and "Bye-Bye" as the primary photographer.

== Music video ==
"Aurora" received two music video releases. The initial visuals included footage of Hamasaki between clips of Azur Lane characters, depicting them on a luxury liner as they headed on adventures set around the event's theme of "navigating the sea". The second video starred the singer and her dance troupe alone in a performance described as "emotive"; when commenting on the recording process, Hamasaki described the song only being finished on the morning of the shoot itself, and that she and her staff found themselves "crying as we filmed".

The music video was directed by Hideaki Sunaga, who has also worked with the singer for "Bye-Bye" and "Mask".

== Promotion ==
"Aurora" was used as the theme song for Azur Lane's 7th anniversary, and was performed live during Hamasaki's Team Ayu Limited: Thank U Tour 2024 tour. Hamasaki also wore the outfit from the music video, designed by Hirosumi Saito, on episodes of Chidori Kamaitachi Hour in June 2024.

On June 26, Hamasaki's staff reported that the music video received over 5.3 million views on Bilibili in its first month.

== Charts ==
| Chart (2024) | Peak position |
|---|---|
| Oricon Weekly Digital Singles Chart | 25 |
| Billboard Japan Download Songs | 26 |
