= Ohia no Ki =

2020 single by Ayumi Hamasaki

Single by Ayumi Hamasaki

from the album Remember You
- Released: July 5, 2020
- Recorded: 2020
- Genre: J-pop; pop ballad
- Length: 4:36
- Label: Avex Trax
- Songwriters: Ayumi Hamasaki (lyrics); Kazuhito Kikuchi (music)

Ayumi Hamasaki singles chronology
"We Are the Queens" (2016)	"Ohia no Ki" (2020)	"Dreamed a Dream" (2020)

Music video
- "Ohia no Ki" on YouTube

"Ohia no Ki" (オヒアの木, lit. "Ohia tree") is a song by Japanese singer-songwriter Ayumi Hamasaki. It was released as a digital single only on July 5, 2020, following the airing of the final episode of M Aisubeki Hito ga Ite. The song is Hamasaki's first new release in almost two years and her first digital single since 2016's "We Are the Queens".

The song debuted at number 1 on the Oricon Daily Digital Singles chart upon release, and peaked at number 14 on the Weekly Digital Singles Chart after exceeding 10,000 downloads.

A physical CD version of "Ohia no Ki" was included in the limited edition of Hamasaki's latest concert DVD, Ayumi Hamasaki Countdown Live 2019–2020: Promised Land A, released in August 2020.

== Background ==
The song was initially teased at midnight on July 3, 2020, with a video flashing the single's cover for a short moment, followed by a text that read “July 4th 24:00 DON’T MISS IT”. It was further teased by a short TV commercial that aired after the final episode of M Aisubeki Hito ga Ite, a drama based on Hamasaki's rise to fame. The single was revealed to be called "Ohia no Ki", her first one to use a non-romanized Japanese title.

It was released on digital platforms and streaming services at midnight on July 5, 2020, making it her first single in almost four years since "We Are the Queens" (2016), and her first release overall since Trouble (2018).

== Writing and production ==
The song's lyrics were written by Hamasaki while composition was handled by Kazuhito Kikuchi who previously composed some of Hamasaki's signature songs such as "Who..." and "Heaven".

Lyrically, the song was inspired by and dedicated to her son, to whom she had given birth in November 2019. The song title comes from the ʻŌhiʻa Lehua flower and may refer to a Hawaiian legend.

== Release ==
The song was released as a digital single on July 5, 2020.

A physical release of the song was included as the second bonus CD on TeamAyu/Mu-mo shop limited editions of Ayumi Hamasaki Countdown Live 2019–2020: Promised Land A, which was released on August 26, 2020. In contrast to the digital version, the CD also contains the song's instrumental. Hamasaki's latest single "Dreamed a Dream" and its instrumental were included on the disc as well.

== Promotion ==
The premiere performance of the song was held during the encore of Hamasaki's Premium Limited Live A: Natsu No Trouble, a special online concert without an audience that was streamed on AbemaTV on July 25, 2020. It was Hamasaki's first live performance in five months since the cancellation of her tour in February due to the ongoing COVID-19 pandemic.

The song was also performed on the first night of 2020 FNS Kayousai on December 2, 2020.

== Music video ==
On July 24, 2020, a "short version" of the music video, lasting only two minutes and thirty-four seconds, was uploaded to Hamasaki's official YouTube channel. It was directed by Kazuyoshi Shimomura, who previously worked on the music videos for Hamasaki's songs "Mirrorcle World" and "Green", both released in 2008, and "Sparkle", released in 2009.

The full version was released on July 30, 2020.

== Commercial performance ==
The song debuted at number one on the Oricon Daily Digital Single Chart with 5,052 copies sold. With only one day's worth of sales due to its being released on the last tracking day of the charting week, it entered the Oricon Weekly Digital Singles Chart at number 18.

In its second week, "Ohia no Ki" reached a new peak on the weekly chart when it rose four positions to number 14. The song sold an additional 5,819 copies, bringing its total sales to 10,871.

== Track listing ==
=== Digital download ===
No.	Title	Length
1.	"Ohia no Ki"	4:36

=== CD ===
No.	Title	Length
1.	"Ohia no Ki"	04:36
2.	"Dreamed a Dream"	04:32
3.	"Ohia no Ki (Instrumental)"	04:36
4.	"Dreamed a Dream (Instrumental)"	04:32
Total length:		18:16

== Charts ==
Chart (2020)	Peak position
Oricon Daily Digital Singles Chart	1
Oricon Weekly Digital Singles Chart	14
Billboard Japan Download Songs	14
