= Ayumi Hamasaki =

Japanese singer, songwriter, and actress (born 1978)

- 浜崎あゆみ
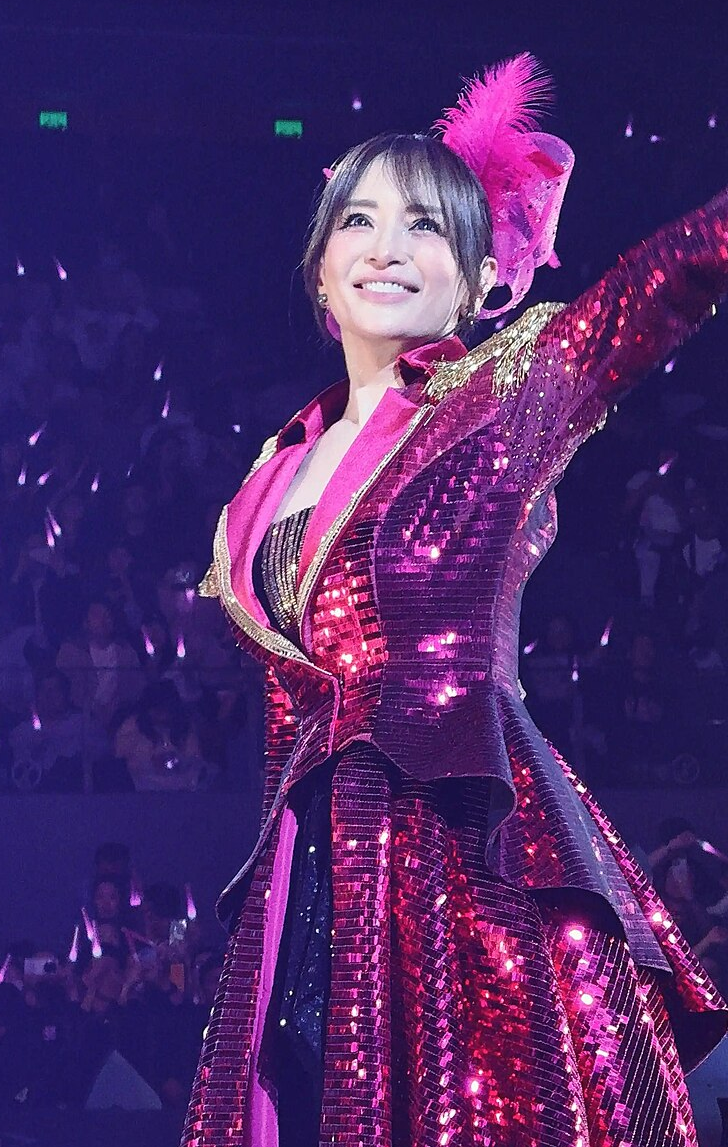
- Hamasaki performing in Ningbo, 2024
- Born: Ayumi Hamasaki (濱﨑 歩); October 2, 1978 (age 48); Fukuoka, Fukuoka Prefecture, Japan
- Other names: Ayu; Crea
- Occupations: Singer; songwriter; record producer; actress; model; spokesperson; entrepreneur
- Works: Discography
- Spouses: Manuel Schwarz (m. 2011; div. 2012) Tyson Bodkin (m. 2014; div. 2016)
- Children: 2
- Musical career
- Genres: J-pop; pop; dance; electronic; rock; classical
- Years active: 1993–present
- Labels: Nippon Columbia; Avex Trax; Warner Music (Malaysia); Pt. Indo Semar Sakti (Indonesia)
- Website: avex.jp/ayu

Signature
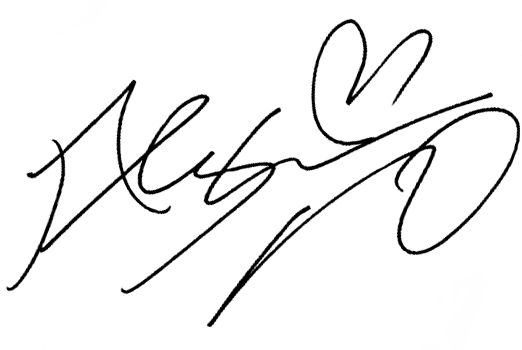

Ayumi Hamasaki (浜崎あゆみ, Hamasaki Ayumi; born October 2, 1978) is a Japanese singer-songwriter and producer. Nicknamed the "Empress of Pop" on account of her influence throughout Asia, she is widely recognized for her versatile music production, songwriting, and live performances. Hamasaki is the best-selling solo artist in Japan, and a cultural icon of the Heisei era.

Born and raised in Fukuoka, Hamasaki moved to Tokyo in 1993 to pursue a career in modeling and acting. In 1998, Hamasaki released her debut single "Poker Face" (Note: Oricon does not count Nothing from Nothing, released by Nippon Columbia, among Hamasaki's albums.) and debut major-label album A Song for ××. The album debuted at the top of the Oricon charts and remained there for five weeks, selling over a million copies. This rapid rise to fame was attributed to her lyrics, listeners praising her insight and relatability. Her next ten albums shipped over a million copies in Japan, with her third, Duty, selling nearly three million. A Best, her first compilation album, further established her position as a crowning artist with more than four million copies sold in Japan. It was at this time that she represented more than 40% of her record label's income.

After A Best, Hamasaki went on to experiment with her music style and lyricism, incorporating English into her work from Rainbow onwards. Later albums would range from electronic dream-pop to rock genres, the singer commenting that she focuses on what she wants to create "whether it is trendy or not". Hamasaki currently holds the record for the most albums to place in the top ten by a female artist in Japan.

Hamasaki has sold over fifty million units in Japan, and has several domestic record achievements for her singles: the most number-one hits by a female artist (38); the most consecutive number-one hits by a solo artist (25), and the most million-sellers. (Note: This last record is shared with Pink Lady, Namie Amuro, and Hikaru Utada.) From 1999 to 2010, Hamasaki had at least two singles each year topping the charts. Hamasaki is also the first female recording artist to have ten studio albums since her debut to top the Oricon, and the first artist to have a number one album for thirteen consecutive years since debut. Hamasaki's remix albums Super Eurobeat Presents Ayu-ro Mix and Ayu-mi-x II Version Non-Stop Mega Mix, are also recognized as two of the best selling remix albums of all time worldwide.

== Life and career ==
=== 1978–1997: Childhood and early endeavors ===
Born in Fukuoka, Fukuoka Prefecture, Hamasaki was raised as an only child by her mother and grandmother. At age seven, while in elementary school, Hamasaki began modeling for local institutions to supplement the family's income. She continued this career path by moving to Tokyo alone at fourteen, signing as a model under the SOS talent agency. Under the name "Ayumi", Hamasaki released a rap EP, Nothing from Nothing, on the Nippon Columbia label in 1995. After her mother moved to Tokyo, Hamasaki began attending Horikoshi Gakuen, as well as taking on acting work in movies and television dramas. From August 1995 to March 1996, Hamasaki co-hosted the SoundLink show Hōkago no Ōsama (After-School King) for Nintendo Satellaview with Shigeru Izumiya.

Hamasaki struggled to adjust to student life, and described living aimlessly after dropping out in tenth grade. It was during this time that she was introduced to Max Matsuura through an acquaintance, who offered her a record deal after hearing her sing at the Velfarre nightclub. Hamasaki suspected ulterior motives and turned the offer down, saying later "I'd never heard of Avex. When he asked if I wanted to pursue a singing career, I said, 'No way.' He was this older guy, and I thought the whole thing sounded fishy."

Matsuura persisted, and Hamasaki eventually agreed to take voice lessons in 1996, most of which she would end up skipping due to reminding her of school. When Matsuura found out, he offered to send her abroad for one-to-one training instead. "I thought he was kidding," Ayu said later of this time. "I mean, I was seventeen." Hamasaki stayed in New York for three months, corresponding frequently with Matsuura. Due to difficulties voicing her thoughts, that correspondence was usually through letter; impressed by her writing style, the producer asked her to try her hand at lyrics while they prepared for her debut through 1997. "No one had ever asked anything of me before, or expected anything," the singer said later. "He's the one who found me and drew me out."

=== 1998–1999: Musical beginnings, A Song for xx, and Loveppears ===
Hamasaki made her debut on April 8, 1998, with the single "Poker Face". Almost a year later, the singer released her debut studio album A Song for ××; it was an unprecedented success, topping the Oricon charts for five weeks and selling over a million copies. Later in 1999, she received the Japan Gold Disc Award for "Best New Artist of the Year".

Ayu-mi-x (March 1999), the first of a series of remix albums, signaled Hamasaki moving beyond the pop-rock sound of A Song for ××. She began to experiment with musical style in her singles, releasing remixes which spanned reggae and house. Later singles became milestones: Hamasaki earned her first number-one single ("Love: Destiny") and first million-selling single ("A"). Her second studio album, Loveppears (November 1999), topped the Oricon charts and sold nearly 3 million copies. In support of Loveppears, she held her first tour: Ayumi Hamasaki Concert Tour 2000 A. Two DVDs of the tour were released: Ayumi Hamasaki Concert Tour 2000 Vol. 1 on September 13, and Ayumi Hamasaki Concert Tour 2000 Vol. 2 on September 27, 2000.

=== 2000–2002: Duty, A Best, I Am..., and Rainbow ===
From April to June 2000, Hamasaki released the "despair trilogy": "Vogue", "Far Away", and "Seasons". Her subsequent studio album, Duty, reflected on her feelings of loneliness, chaos, confusion, and the burden of responsibility; it resonated with fans, and became Hamasaki's best-selling studio album. At the end of 2000, Hamasaki held her first New Year countdown concert at the Yoyogi National Gymnasium.

In 2001, Hamasaki released her first compilation album, A Best. In support of Duty and A Best, Hamasaki held a tour of Japan's domes.

In 2002, the singer released her fourth studio album, I Am..., which featured her own compositions under the pseudonym "Crea". In light of the September 11 attacks, Hamasaki revised her vision of the album, focusing on issues such as faith and world peace. "A Song Is Born", a duet with Keiko Yamada, was released as part of Avex's Song Nation project. (Note: Original text: "このシングルは2001年9月11に米国で発生した同時多発テロを追悼するために企画され、リリースと同時に日本で話題を集めたチャリティーシングル『song+nation』の3枚だ。" "まず、浜崎あゆみとKEIKOがデュエットした『a song is born』が2001年12月12日にリリースされた。") She also changed her idea for the album cover, opting instead to be portrayed as a "peace muse":

I had a completely different idea for the cover at first. We'd already reserved the space, decided the hair and makeup and everything. But after the incident, as is typical of me, I suddenly changed my mind. I knew it wasn't the time for gaudiness, for elaborate sets and costumes. It sounds odd coming from me, but I realize what I say and how I look has a great impact.

In support of I Am..., Hamasaki held two tours: Ayumi Hamasaki Arena Tour 2002 A, and Ayumi Hamasaki Stadium Tour 2002 A. Live albums of both tours were released in 2003. Later that year, Hamasaki performed at the MTV Asia music awards ceremony in Singapore, and received the award for "Most Influential Japanese Singer in Asia". In November she released her first European single, "Connected", under the name "Ayu". It was released in Germany on the Drizzly label. Hamasaki continued to release singles in Germany until 2005.

The singles "Free & Easy". "H", and "Voyage" were released ahead of Hamasaki's next studio album, Rainbow (December 2002).

=== 2003–2006: My Story, (Miss)Understood, and Secret ===
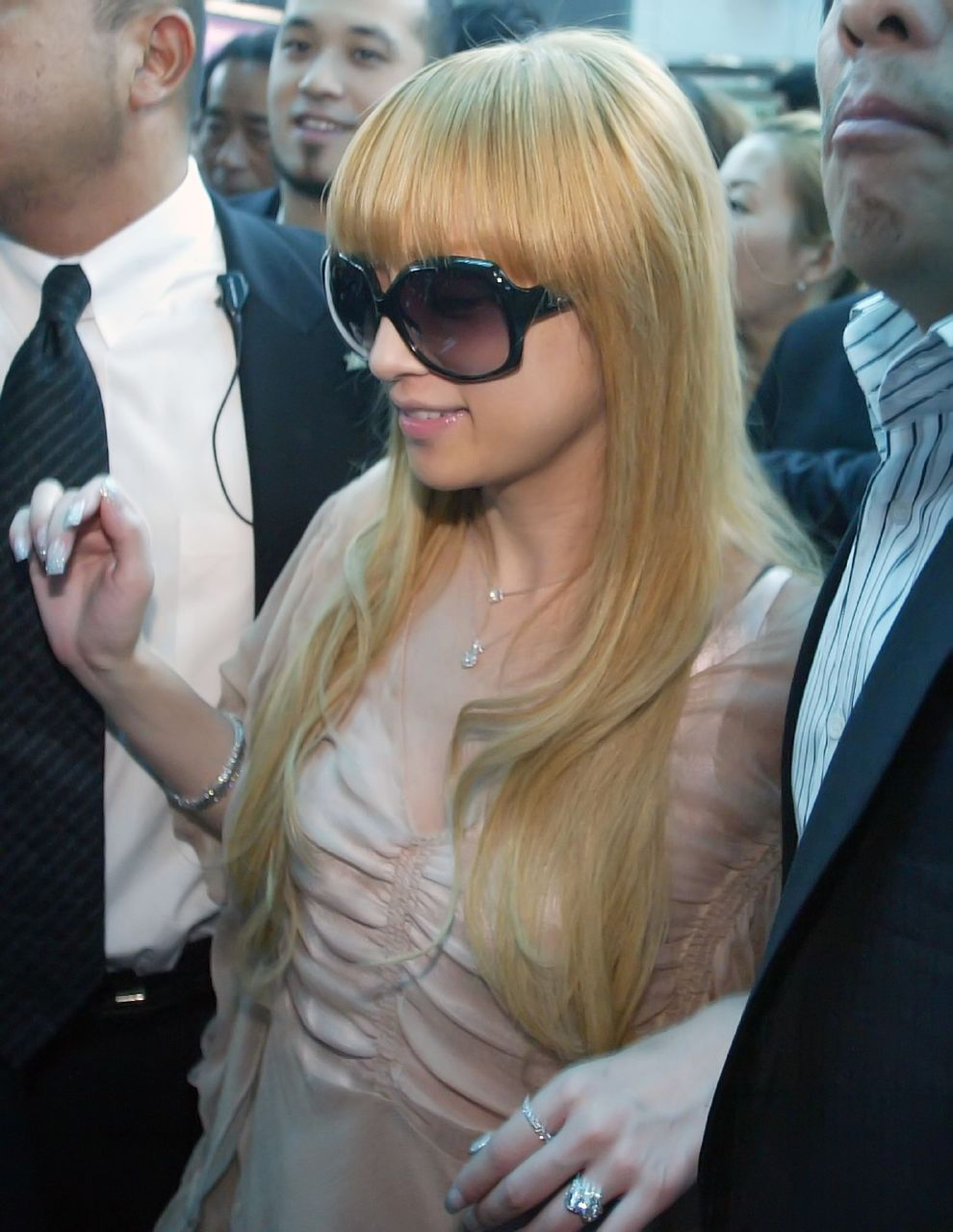
Hamasaki in Taiwan (2007)

In 2003, Hamasaki released three singles, "&", "Forgiveness", and "No Way to Say". The singer then held the A Museum concert at the Yoyogi National Gymnasium. The singer's next release, the EP Memorial Address, topped the Oricon chart and sold over a million copies. Despite this, sales of Hamasaki's singles began to wane — although all three of the album's singles topped the Oricon charts, "&" was Hamasaki's last single to sell over 500,000 copies. By the end of Arena Tour 2003–2004, Hamasaki had grown disillusioned with her position in Avex. This period of reassessment led her to begin work on her next studio album, My Story, ahead of schedule.

My Story and its singles, "Moments", "Inspire", and "Carols", all topped the weekly Oricon charts; moreover, with sales of over 1,100,000 units, My Story became Hamasaki's last million-selling studio album according to Oricon. (Note: (Miss)understood is listed as a million-seller by the RIAJ, but the RIAJ's certification is based on the number of albums shipped to retailers; Oricon gathers its tallies from the retailers themselves.) From January to April 2005, Hamasaki held the nationwide Ayumi Hamasaki Arena Tour 2005 A: My Story tour. My Story Classical, a classical version of My Story, was released in March 2005.

(Miss)understood, Hamasaki's seventh studio album, was released in January 2006. In support of the album, Hamasaki held the Ayumi Hamasaki Arena Tour 2006 A tour, which spanned three months with thirty concerts.

"Startin'", Hamasaki's twenty-sixth number-one single, was released in March 2006. The subsequent studio album, Secret, was released in November 2006.

=== 2007–2008: A Best 2, Guilty, and A Complete ===
In February 2007, Hamasaki released A Best 2. The two versions, White and Black, debuted at the first and second positions on the Oricon weekly charts. Tour of Secret was then held from March to the end of June.

Hamasaki released "Glitter/Fated", "Talkin' 2 Myself", and "Together When..." ahead of her ninth studio album, Guilty, released in January 2008. In April, Hamasaki released the single "Mirrorcle World" to commemorate her tenth anniversary since debut. Between April and September 2008, Hamasaki held her second tour of Asia: Asia Tour 2008: 10th Anniversary. On September 10, Hamasaki released A Complete: All Singles.

=== 2009–2011: Next Level, Rock 'n' Roll Circus, Love Songs, and Five ===
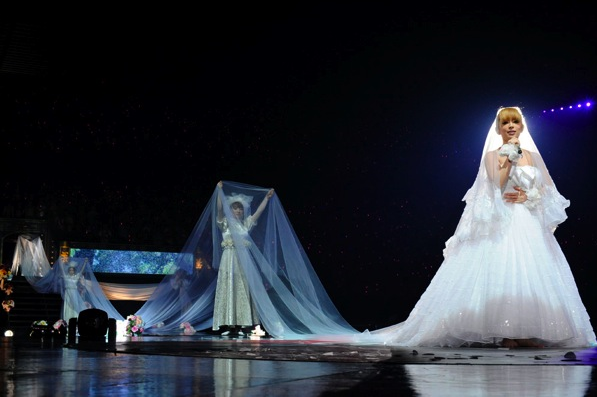
Rock n' Roll Circus: 7 Days Special tour (2010)

Hamasaki's next two releases, "Days/Green" and "Rule/Sparkle", continued her streak of number-one singles. The subsequent studio album, Next Level, was released on March 25, 2009. Next Level reached the top of the Oricon charts, making Hamasaki the only artist to have a number-one album every year for eleven years in a row since her debut. On August 12, 2009, Hamasaki released "Sunrise/Sunset (Love Is All)". "Sunrise (Love Is All)" was used as the theme song for the Japanese television drama Dandy Daddy?. Hamasaki's third single of the year, "You Were.../Ballad", was used for Tinker Bell and the Lost Treasure in Japan.

Hamasaki's eleventh studio album Rock 'n' Roll Circus was released on April 14, 2010. Hamasaki also began expanding her online presence, setting up accounts on MySpace, Ustream, and Twitter. In July, entertainment company Livespire announced that Hamasaki's 2009 Next Level tour would be shown in 3D at Toho cinemas nationwide during August 2010. Later that year, Hamasaki released singles "Moon/Blossom", "Crossroad", and "L". On December 22, Hamasaki released Love Songs, which debuted atop the Oricon album chart.

In February 2011, it was announced that her upcoming tour, Hotel Love Songs, would start in April. It was later renamed to Power of Music and delayed until late May due to the Tōhoku earthquake and tsunami disaster, Hamasaki instead focusing on charity efforts in the immediate aftermath.

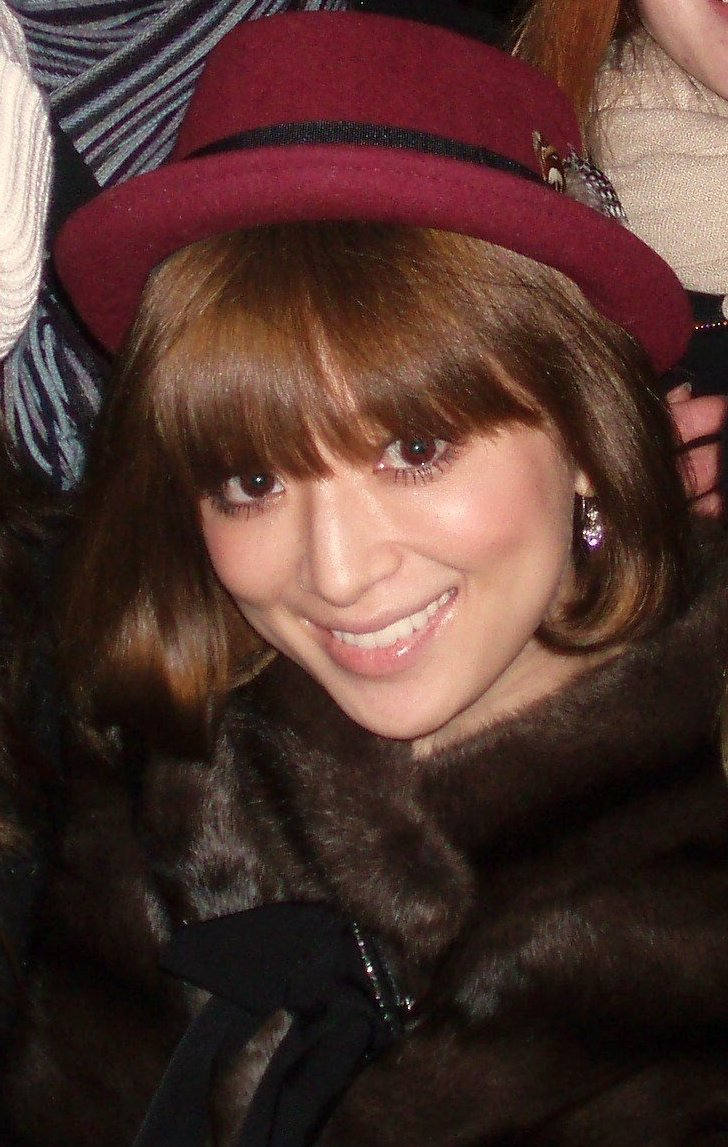
Hamasaki meeting fans in London (2010)

On April 20, 2011, Hamasaki simultaneously released four Ayu-mi-x 7 remix albums: House, Acoustic Orchestra, Trance 4, and Ayu-ro Mix 4. On the same day, 2010 Rock 'n' Roll Circus Tour and A 50 Singles: Live Selection topped the weekly chart at number one and two respectively. The simultaneous releases made Hamasaki the first artist ever to have four albums in Oricon's top ten, and also the first artist to hold the two top positions on the Oricon DVD chart.

On August 31, Hamasaki released her second mini album: Five. It topped the Oricon chart for two weeks.

=== 2012–2013: 15th anniversary, Party Queen, Love again, and A Summer Best ===
On March 21, Hamasaki released her thirteenth studio album, Party Queen. During the press tour, Hamasaki would say that she had considered making the release her first double album due to "how easy" songwriting had been during production.

On August 6, 2012, Hamasaki released her sixth compilation album A Summer Best. In September, it was announced that there would be new material for five consecutive months to celebrate the artist's fifteenth anniversary; these releases consisted of Love, Again, A Classical, Love Again, and Arena Tour 2012 A: Hotel Love Songs.

In April 2013, Hamasaki began the 15th Anniversary Tour: A Best Live tour. Its setlist, selected by an online fan survey, was later released as her first live CD.

=== 2014–2015: Colours, A One, and Sixxxxxx ===
From May 30 to July 6, 2014, Hamasaki held her Premium Showcase: Feel the Love tour. Hamasaki's fifteenth studio album, entitled Colours, was released on July 2, 2014; recorded in Los Angeles, it was the sole project the singer worked on entirely in the United States. Of its creative direction, Hamasaki said: "Now that I'm living in L.A., I thought 'I want to do work I could only do in L.A'... I was very proactive about it."

A One, Hamasaki's sixteenth studio album, was released on April 8, 2015; during its press tour, the singer described the album as a return to "the 'Ayumi Hamasaki' of the past". Between April and July 2015, Hamasaki embarked on her Arena Tour 2015 A: Cirque de Minuit tour, followed by the release of Sixxxxxx, her sixth EP. To promote the release, Hamasaki held her first fan club exclusive tour in twelve years. On December 23, 2015, Hamasaki released Winter Diary: A7 Classical.

=== 2016–2020: Made in Japan, 20th anniversary, Trouble ===
A 15th anniversary edition of A Best was released on March 28, 2016. In May 2016, Hamasaki began the Arena Tour 2016 A: Made in Japan tour.

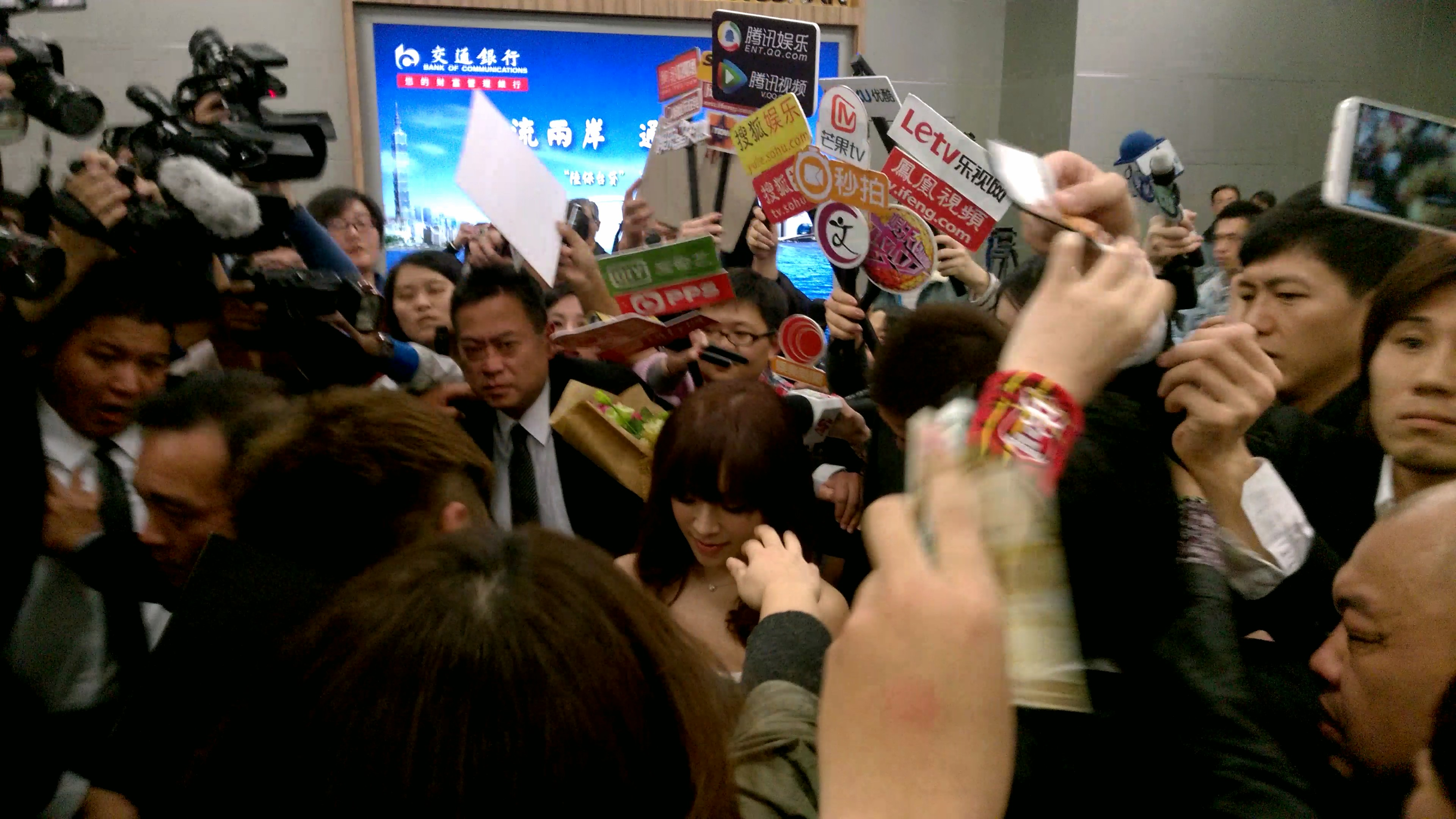
Hamasaki during a 2015 press tour in Taipei

On May 11, 2016, Made in Japan was released on the streaming platform AWA. A year later in May 2017, Hamasaki embarked on her Just the Beginning Tour 2017 tour. The second part of the tour, Just the Beginning Part 2: Sacrifice, was held between September and November. On September 6, Hamasaki released "Words" as a free download for tour attendees. The third chapter of the tour was held in December 2017 through February 2018.

The Power of Music: 20th Anniversary tour ran from April 7 to July 22, 2018. Trouble, her seventh EP, was released on August 15, 2018. In October, Hamasaki began the Ayumi Hamasaki Live Tour: Trouble 2018–2019 tour, which was then extended from May 2019 into Trouble Tour 2019–2020: Misunderstood. In between, Hamasaki held her annual New Year's Eve concert: Countdown Live 2019–2020: Promised Land.

In February 2020, the singer began her Trouble Tour 2020: Saigo no Trouble tour; it was later canceled after two dates due to the COVID-19 pandemic. In response, Hamasaki organized and took part in multiple online concerts: Premium Limited Live A: Natsu no Trouble on July 25, A-Nation Online 2020 on August 29, Trouble Tour 2020: Saigo no Trouble – Final on October 2, and Special Showcase Xmas Eve 2020 on December 24. Countdown Live 2020–2021 A: Music For Life, two concerts for December 30 and 31, was canceled on December 29 due to a member of staff testing positive with COVID-19. Two singles, "Ohia no Ki" and "Dreamed a Dream", were released in July 2020.

=== 2021–2022: A Ballads 2 ===
Hamasaki released the compilation album A Ballads 2, which peaked at number three in the Oricon top ten, and single "23rd Monster" on April 8, 2021.

In June 2021, Hamasaki held Music for Life: Return, which used some of the concept and setlist initially planned for the canceled Countdown Live 2020 – 2021: Music For Life concert. Summer Party 2021 was held on August 23. Hamasaki then embarked on Asia Tour 2021–2022 A: 23rd Monster from October 2; despite the name, there were no confirmed dates outside of Japan due to COVID-19 restrictions.

On November 4, it was reported that Hamasaki had fractured her ankle but that her concerts later that week would still be held. On November 6, the artist was found unresponsive after that evening's event, and was hospitalized for anaphylactic shock. Hamasaki returned to work on November 13 for 17LIVE 4th Anniversary meets Ayumi Hamasaki, and later had surgery for her ankle on November 16. At the end of the year, her Countdown Live 2021 – 2022 A: 23rd Monster concerts were held in Tokyo along with a livestream on dTV.

Hamasaki held an anniversary concert titled Asia Tour: 24th Anniversary Special on April 6, 2022, and toured July through August for Summer TA Party 2022. After announcing that work had begun on an upcoming studio album, singles "Nonfiction", "Summer Again", and "Mask" were released, each debuting in the top five of the Oricon Daily Digital Singles Chart.

The final show for Asia Tour 2021–2022 A: 23rd Monster took place on December 10, 2022, in Nagoya. Countdown Live 2022–2023: Remember You was held on December 30 and 31 at Yoyogi National Stadium. It marked the singer's twentieth new year concert ahead of her 25th anniversary since debut.

=== 2023: 25th anniversary, Remember You ===
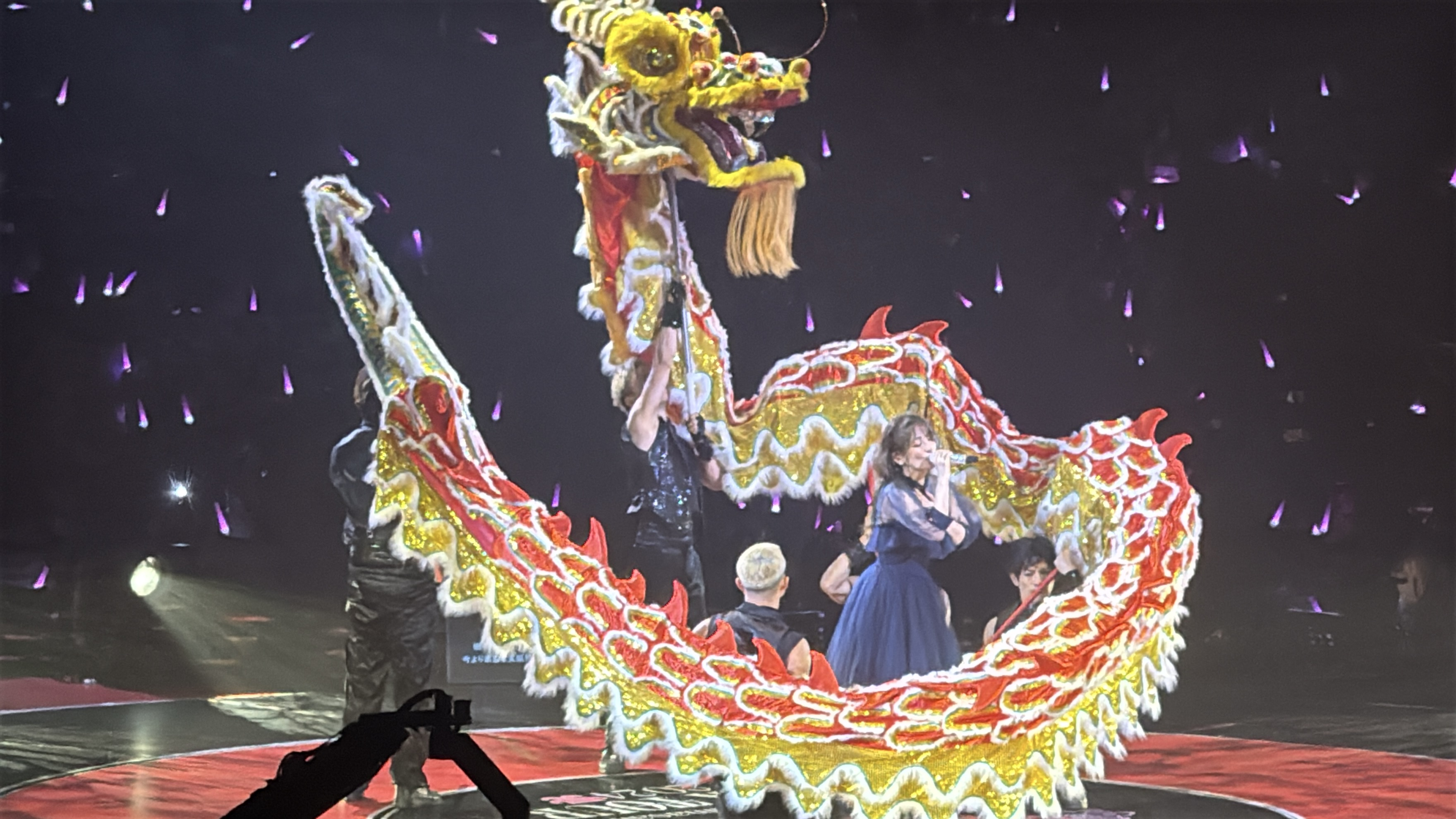
Asia Tour 2024 A: I am Ayu (Shanghai)

On January 25, Hamasaki released her eighteenth studio album: Remember You. The album's subsequent performance earned her the distinction of becoming the female artist with the most albums to reach the top ten on the Oricon charts.

On March 28, Hamasaki was announced as a brand ambassador for Rhythm Co. Ltd. When asked about her 25th anniversary, the singer said: "I couldn't do all of this alone for 25 years, if I'd only done it for myself. I want to repay the people who took care of me. (...) I don't really feel like celebrating myself at all." The singer held her 25th Anniversary Live concert on April 8 alongside a livestream hosted by Abema. From April 7, the 25th Anniversary Shibuya109 Campaign took place to celebrate Hamasaki's milestone year.

On July 8, Hamasaki began her 25th Anniversary Tour, announcing three different acts that ran until March 2024. The scheduled dates included locations in all 47 prefectures of Japan, a first for the singer; Hamasaki would say later that this came from a wish to "see all of Team Ayu" for her 25th anniversary. Hamasaki's new year concert, Countdown Live 2023–2024: A Complete 25, took place later that year at Yoyogi Stadium on December 30–31. A livestream of the final date was broadcast by Abema.

Countdown Live 2025-2026 A: We Are Ayu (Tokyo)

=== 2024–present: I am Ayu ===
In March 2024, Hamasaki released a cover of Miyuki Nakajima's "Jidai" as the theme song for Banpaku no Taiyo. In April, "Bye-Bye" was used as the April–May theme for Minna no Uta, becoming Hamasaki's first contribution to the program. On May 21, "Aurora" received a limited release as the theme for Azur Lane's seventh anniversary; it was released internationally on June 26.

On September 1, Hamasaki performed on the main stage at A-Nation 2024. Other performers included Koda Kumi, Red Velvet, and TRF. From September 2 to October 2, Hamasaki embarked on the TA Limited: Thank U Tour, holding seven concerts across four locations in Japan. Hamasaki's third tour of Asia, the I Am Ayu Tour, began in Shanghai on November 1, and included dates for her annual Countdown Live concerts in Tokyo.

On April 8, 2025, the Asia Tour 2025: I Am Ayu Ep. II tour began in Tokyo, Japan. "Mimosa" was released on the same day to commemorate the singer's 27th anniversary, and was used for the third season of Second to Last Love. On April 15, Hamasaki received the Best Artist award during the 2025 Weibo Culture Exchange Night. An NHK special, titled NHK Songs Ayumi Hamasaki, aired on June 26. It consisted of a long-form interview held by Yo Oizumi, behind the scenes clips and interviews from the singer's Hong Kong concert earlier that same month, and performances of "Inspire", "Mirrorcle World", and "Mimosa". On August 31, Hamasaki performed at A Nation 2025, her set ending with a group showcase of "Wow War Tonight" alongside artists including Hey! Say! JUMP, Da-ice, and TRF. She finished the year with Countdown Live 2025-2026 A: We are Ayu, holding concert dates on December 30 and 31.

A tour of Japan was announced on January 21, 2026, titled Japan Tour 2026 A: Scapegoat. It will run from April 8 until November 27, 2026.

== Artistry ==
=== Lyrics ===
In the beginning, I was searching for myself in my music. My music was for me. I didn't have the mental room to be conscious of the listener; I wrote to save myself. I didn't understand what it was to write songs. But over time I began to see many things, my influence, the responsibilities that gave me.

— Hamasaki on the new lyrical directions in I Am....

Having trouble voicing her thoughts out loud, Hamasaki began writing as an outlet; she draws inspiration from her own experiences and emotions, as well as from the lives of those around her. She has stated that honesty is essential to her lyrics, saying, "If I write when I'm low, it will be a dark song, but I don't care. I want to be honest with myself at all times".

In Hamasaki's debut years, Tetsu Misaki noted a large change in the lyrical style between A Song for ×× and her following albums Loveppears, and Duty. Misaki believed that Hamasaki's meteoric rise to fame had impacted her perspective, signaled by her using the words bokura (僕ら, "we") and tsutaeru (伝える, "convey/tell") more often; it gave the impression that she was thinking more on her influence as a public figure. Hamasaki's awareness of her fame went on to shape the lyrical direction of her albums I Am... and Rainbow, only returning to a more autobiographical style with My Story; in a 2004 interview, she stated that her goal was to return to making something "unmistakably human", instead of writing to give people hope or comfort.

Hamasaki's lyrics went on to define her public image; in two surveys conducted by Oricon in 2007 and 2008, respondents voted Hamasaki's writing as their favorite aspect of her artistry. Steve McClure of The Japan Times noted that Hamasaki quickly developed a reputation as a "thoughtful, introspective lyricist"; The Village Voice went further, complimenting her ability to sing of "the pain and happiness of millennial life". Subaru Tomioka, in regard to the singer's impact on the LGBTQ community, appreciated how she "replaced love songs between men and women with ones between people of the same sex, in a world where role models hadn't previously existed outside of your own imagination". Tomioka also highlighted her ability to bring emotion into her work, specifically the enmity Hamasaki has conveyed through songs such as "My Name's Women", "Lady Dynamite", and "Vibees".

A notable aspect of Hamasaki's discography is her consistent use of English for her song, album, and tour titles; in an interview for her fifteenth anniversary, the singer stated "The meaning would be more restricted in Japanese - for example, if I use 'red' instead of 'aku' (赤), wouldn't you wonder, "What's the meaning? It's not simply 'aku', right?" I want to evoke more ideas (from the reader)".

"Evolution" (2001)
Many of Hamasaki's songs are dance tunes, such as "Evolution" (2001), a self-composed single that also has rock elements.

"M" (2000)
"M", the first song composed by Hamasaki under the pseudonym "Crea", shifts to a relative key, like most of her self-composed songs.

"Bold & Delicious" (2005)
Hamasaki took new directions on (Miss)understood, as epitomized by the single "Bold & Delicious", a funk-influenced song that used a gospel-style chorus.

=== Musical style ===
Hamasaki has released almost three hundred original songs; through them, she has covered a wide range of musical styles, such as dance, metal, R&B, progressive rock, pop, and classical. Hamasaki has cited Madonna, Babyface, En Vogue, Led Zeppelin, and Deep Purple among her early influences, and has openly appreciated the works of Seiko Matsuda, Michelle Branch, Yumi Matsutoya, Rie Miyazawa, Utada Hikaru, Joan Osborne, Miyuki Nakajima, and Keiko Yamada.

Hamasaki began commissioning remixes of her songs early in her career, and this practice also influenced the diversity of her music. These remixes span a variety of genres such as Eurobeat, house, and trance, as well as acoustic mixes, classical and traditional Chinese music. The musicians and acts she has worked with directly include Above & Beyond, the Lamoureux Orchestra, (Note: For a comprehensive list of Hamasaki's Avex-sanctioned remixes released in Japan, see Hamasaki's discography at mu-mo.net.) Junkie XL, and the Princess China Music Orchestra.

In addition to writing her own lyrics, Hamasaki has involved herself in other aspects of production throughout her career. Though Max Matsuura is officially credited as the producer of her records, he said of Hamasaki, "Ayu is a very meticulous worker behind the scenes. A lot of the work she does by herself is more in the producer's arena. I think really we should say 'Produced by Ayumi Hamasaki'." In 2022, Matsuura stated that he stepped away from the lead producer role in 2000 as Hamasaki took on more responsibilities.

Hamasaki began to pen her own compositions in 2000, beginning with her single "M". During its production process, she struggled to find a melody that matched what she had in mind, and decided it would be faster to compose it herself. In a 2001 interview, she stated that 'I never thought it was important for me to start writing original songs... with "M", it just so happened that the melody I wrote fit the best.' In the same interview, Hamasaki said she felt no pressure to continue composing, and that she felt she could 'only go so far' with it due to her lack of formal knowledge. Her final published composition was "Will", the b-side track to the 2005 single "Heaven".

=== Videos and stage ===
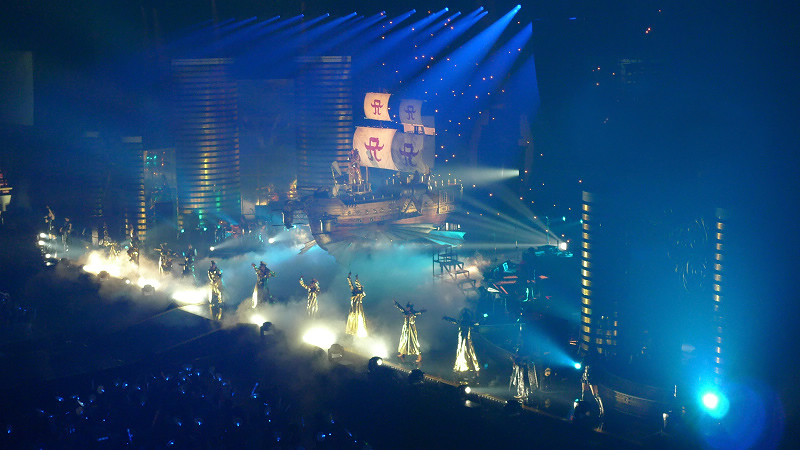
A performance of "Mirrorcle World" (2008)

Hamasaki is often involved in the artistic direction of her music videos. The themes of the videos are varied; many contain short storylines, some of which use symbolism to convey their respective messages. Additionally, the videos of "Fairyland", "My Name's Women", "Jewel", "Green", and "Virgin Road" are among the top twenty or so most expensive music videos, making Hamasaki the only non-American artist to hold such a distinction.

Hamasaki is also involved in the production and artistic direction of her live performances; they, like her videos, are often lavish productions and use a variety of props, extravagant costumes, and choreographed dances. She has used large video screens, fireworks, simulated rain drops, trick stage floors, and suspended devices.

== Public image and legacy ==
Hamasaki's lyrics and image initially gained a following predominantly among young Generation X and Millennials, often referred to as "the voice of the lost generation". Music critic Tetsu Misaki believed that the juxtaposition of her fashionable appearance and her personal lyrics was one of her most important selling points, helping shape the 2000s pop scene in Japan. Teresa Nieman of The Guardian wrote that Hamasaki's willingness to take on unusual subject matter is what made her noteworthy among her peers, naming her as the 'undisputed Queen of J-pop'. According to publications, it was that ability to contrast striking visuals and vulnerability that went on to inspire an entire generation across Asia.

Lisa Takeuchi Cullen of Time magazine credits some of Hamasaki's early success to her "by-the-bootstraps climb to pop royalty" journey, her perspective resonating with the general public. Tomoyuki Hokari of OKMusic agrees, considering her lyricism as a "reaction against the customs and culture of the previous generation", and a "terrifyingly calm, objective view" on the social turmoil of turn-of-the-century Japan. In addition, her history of supporting LGBTQ rights has led to widespread recognition as a gay icon, and remains a defining element of her image.

In the 2000s, her frequent changes in image greatly impacted the course of fashion. Described as a "chameleonic style icon", Hamasaki was known for being fully involved in every aspect of her work, displaying an unprecedented degree of ownership over her image; the control she had over the market drove stores to buy black market paparazzi shots of magazine shoots pre-publication, hoping to get ahead of the next "Ayu-instigated trend". Mishal Varna of MTV compared her influence to that of Madonna, reflecting on the singer drawing in over 150 million viewers to her performance on MTV Asia. A regular face on publications such as Vivi, Popteen, and Cawaii!, Hamasaki herself considered her constantly changing image essential to her craft. That process is credited for the creation of the hime-kei wave, along with influencing returning Y2K kogal and gyaru-kei trends.

Hamasaki's career has become the subject of academic study, and is considered to have had a profound impact on how the Japanese music industry manages and promotes female artists. Zhan Hongzhi of Inter-Margins magazine named her success as a type of "identity economy", explaining: "Japan spends 33.3 billion yen a year on Hamasaki. She is no longer just an idol. She has become "Hamasaki Industries", a media in her own right." In the wider media industry, various artists have spoken of being influenced directly by Hamasaki; these include Itano Tomomi, Mao Asado, Maximum the Hormone, Tsubasa Masuwaka, Sayaka Kanda, Ken Hirai, Ayaki Sasaki, Chiharu Niiyama, Riisa Naka, Lin Yu-chun, Rinka, Asako Ito, Mana Sakura, Misono, Rina (Scandal), Rie Tanaka, and Rina Kawaei.

In her early years Hamasaki referred to herself as a product, often speaking about the "Ayumi Hamasaki" brand as a separate person: "We're similar, in some respects. It's my own image. It is necessary that I am viewed as a product. (...) I understand it's my role to realize people's dreams." This approach, despite Hamasaki later opposing it, led to conflict between her artistry and her economic influence; accusations of the singer having lost her relatability, or presenting an overly cultivated image, have continued throughout her career. A renewed sense of appreciation for Hamasaki's work was covered by media outlets during her 25th anniversary, The First Times writing: "Involved in the Japanese pop scene for over 24 years, she has never stopped touring, never stopped releasing new music, and has never taken a break to recharge her batteries. How many artists can we say we have like that?"

== Other activities ==
=== Philanthropy ===
In March 2011, Hamasaki donated 30 million yen to relief efforts for the Tōhoku earthquake and tsunami. In 2021, the artist donated 10 million yen to the Japanese National Center for Global Health and Medicine, receiving the Medal of Honor. During the 2022 typhoon aftermath in the Shizuoka prefecture, Hamasaki openly criticized the media for not reporting on the disaster thoroughly. Over a period of three days, she organized a donation point and visited Shizuoka to talk to survivors and coordinate resources.

In May 2018, Hamasaki was the headliner for Tokyo Pride, held in Yoyogi Park. During her performance, the singer spoke about her friends in the Ni-chōme district and the need to stand up for change: "Japan is still a conservative country, so there is a part of us that cannot shake off the idea that those in minority groups are wrong. If there are moments in the future when you feel small and want to give up, please remember this day—I hope that you will always be proud of who you are, and keep going. I will always be walking alongside you."

In 2023, Hamasaki adopted two dogs who had severe medical issues and a background of abuse. Speaking jointly with animal shelter representatives, Hamasaki highlighted the need to provide care for long-term residents of rescue homes, and encouraged awareness of puppy mills and the impact adoption can have: "Saving an animal's life won't change the world, but you can change that animal's world forever".

=== Ayuready? ===
From October 2002 to March 2004, Hamasaki was the host of her own talk and variety TV show, named Ayuready?, on Fuji Television. The talk show, which aired on Saturday nights from 11:30 to midnight, often featured her performing songs with guests. Among the names who appeared on the program were Goto Maki, Puffy, and Akina Nakamori. To promote the program (and her album Rainbow), Hamasaki opened the Rainbow House restaurant on Shōnan Beach on July 1, 2003, which was open until August 31, 2003. After almost two years, the last episode of Ayuready? aired in March 2004.

=== Branded products and endorsements ===
Throughout her early career under Avex, Hamasaki promoted products that ranged from electronics (Tu-Ka cell phones and Panasonic) to various snack foods. Among the products she has advertised on television are the Honda Crea scooter, KOSÉ cosmetics, Mister Donut donuts, and Boss coffee. Although Hamasaki initially supported the exploitation of her popularity for commercial purposes, saying that it was "necessary that [she is] viewed as a product", she eventually opposed Avex's decision to market her as a "product rather than a person" from 2004. This began a significant hiatus from lending her name to product advertisements and endorsements.

Hamasaki's "A" logo

In 2001, Hamasaki launched her own limited-run fashion brand, MTRLG (Material Girl); the clothes were sold at MTRLG boutiques and at Mise S*clusive stores. In 2002, Hamasaki created Ayupan, a cartoon version of herself that appeared in a line of merchandise (mainly figurines), and in a 2003 animation. For her 2007 tour Tour of Secret, Hamasaki collaborated with Sanrio to create a line of merchandise, "Ayumi Hamasaki x Hello Kitty". The merchandise included cell phone straps and Lumix cameras decorated with a picture of Hello Kitty behind Hamasaki's "A" logo; (Note: This is the symbol:. It is used either as a substitute for the letter a or to represent Hamasaki's name. The titles of six albums, Rainbow, A Best, A Ballads, A Best 2 -White-, A Best 2 -Black-, and A Complete use this symbol; the titles of these albums appearing as RINBOW, Best, Ballads, Best 2 -White-, Best 2 -Black-, and Complete. (Dashes are commonly used in Japanese script to enclose subtitles.)) the former product was a result of a collaboration with Sanrio and Japanese fashion brand Ash & Diamonds, the latter a collaboration with Sanrio and Panasonic.

In August 2019, author Narumi Komatsu released a novel about the early years of Hamasaki's career: M Aisubeki Hito ga Ite. The book included a written endorsement from the artist as a part of its introduction. On social media, Hamasaki stated that the book "combined both fact and fiction" and had become its own story. A television drama-series based on the novel aired from April to July 2020.

In March 2023, Hamasaki became a beauty brand ambassador for Rhythm Co., representing their R-Face BFT Pack product. The packaging included Hamasaki's signature "A" logo, and advertisements used "Mask" as the official collaboration theme. On October 2, Hamasaki was announced as a brand ambassador for Gem Castle, "Dearest" being used throughout their 45th anniversary campaign.

In December 2024, Hamasaki announced an official collaboration with the Sailor Moon brand. Merchandise featured an illustration by Naoko Takeuchi of Ayu and titular character Usagi. On the same day, the artist also launched her second design line with Sanrio: "Ayupan x My Melody".

== Personal life ==
=== Relationships ===
Hamasaki had a romantic relationship with her producer, Max Matsuura, from 1998 to 2000.

Hamasaki began dating actor Tomoya Nagase in 2000, with their relationship ending in 2007. The pair had known each other since co-starring in a TV drama together in 1997.

On January 1, 2011, Hamasaki announced her engagement to Austrian actor and model Manuel Schwarz, whom she had met on the set of "Virgin Road". On January 2, her office announced that she and Schwarz had married in the United States the day before. On January 16, 2012, Hamasaki announced her divorce through her fan club website, Team Ayu.

On December 13, 2013, it was announced through a fan club blog post that Hamasaki was engaged. In the announcement, the singer said "As my partner is an ordinary student, I would be very happy if you could watch over us quietly." On March 3, 2014, the singer announced her second marriage. The couple filed for divorce in September 2016.

On January 1, 2020, Hamasaki revealed that she had given birth to her first child, a son, at "the end of last year". On October 2, 2020, Hamasaki announced her second pregnancy through the Team Ayu website, and in May 2021 confirmed that her second child had been born "sometime in spring".

=== Health ===
In January 2008, Hamasaki announced on her blog that an inoperable condition, possibly tinnitus or Ménière's disease, had caused complete deafness in her left ear. While the diagnosis was made in 2006, the symptoms reportedly dated back to 2000, originating from continued stage performances while having an ear infection. Hamasaki stated in the blog post that she wished to continue singing, and that she wanted to "continue delivering the best performance I can".

On May 20, 2017, Hamasaki revealed that she had begun losing hearing in her right ear as well, also experiencing severe bouts of dizziness and nausea. She vowed to continue performing, writing: "The stage is where I belong. It's the only place I really, truly exist. I don't know anything else." In 2023, the singer ended a performance on NHK Music Special by signing "Don't give up on your dreams" in JSL.

== Discography ==
- A Song for ×× (1999)
- Loveppears (1999)
- Duty (2000)
- I Am... (2002)
- Rainbow (2002)
- My Story (2004)
- (Miss)understood (2006)
- Secret (2006)
- Guilty (2008)
- Next Level (2009)
- Rock 'n' Roll Circus (2010)
- Love Songs (2010)
- Party Queen (2012)
- Love Again (2013)
- Colours (2014)
- A One (2015)
- Made in Japan (2016)
- Remember You (2023)

== Concert tours ==
=== Japan tours ===
- Concert Tour 2000 Vol. 1 (2000)
- Concert Tour 2000 Vol. 2 (2000)
- Dome Tour 2001 A (2001)
- Arena Tour 2002 A (2002)
- Stadium Tour 2002 A (2002)
- Limited Team Ayu Live Tour (2003)
- A Museum: 30th Single Collection Live (2003)
- Arena Tour 2003–2004 A (2003–2004)
- Arena Tour 2005 A: My Story (2005)
- Arena Tour 2006 A: (Miss)understood (2006)
- Arena Tour 2009 A: Next Level (2009)
- Rock 'n' Roll Circus Tour Final: 7 Days Special (2010)
- Power of Music 2011 A (2011)
- Arena Tour 2012 A: Hotel Love Songs (2012)
- 15th Anniversary Tour: A Best Live (2013)
- Premium Showcase: Feel the Love (2014)
- Arena Tour 2015 A: Cirque de Minuit – The Final (2015)
- Team Ayu Limited Live Tour 2015 (2015)
- Arena Tour 2016 A: Made In Japan (2016)
- Team Ayu Limited Live Tour 2016 (2016)
- Just the Beginning 20 Tour 2017 (2017–2018)
- Arena Tour 2018: Power of Music 20th Anniversary (2018)
- Trouble Tour 2018–2019 A (2018–2019)
- 21st Anniversary: Power of A^3 (2019)
- Trouble Tour 2019 A: Misunderstood (2019)
- Asia Tour 2021–2022 A: 23rd Monster (2021–2022) (Note: As there were no concerts held outside of Japan due to pandemic restrictions, it is listed as a national tour.)
- 25th Anniversary Live Tour (2023–2024)
- Team Ayu Limited: Thank U Tour 2024 (2024)
- Japan Tour 2026 A: Scapegoat (2026)

=== Promotional concerts ===
- Premium Limited Live A: Natsu no Trouble (2020)
- Trouble Tour 2020 A: Saigo no Trouble – Final (2020)
- Special Showcase Xmas Eve 2020 (2020)
- Music for Life: Return (2021)
- Summer TA Party (2021)
- Asia Tour: 24th Anniversary Special (2022)
- Summer TA Party 2022 (2022)
- 25th Anniversary Live (2023)

=== Asia tours ===
- Asia Tour 2007 A: Tour of Secret (2007)
- Asia Tour 2008: 10th Anniversary (2008)
- Asia Tour 2024–2025: I Am Ayu (2024–2025)

=== New Year's Eve concerts ===
- Countdown Live 2000–2001 A
- Countdown Live 2001–2002 A
- Countdown Live 2002–2003 A
- Countdown Live 2004–2005 A
- Countdown Live 2005–2006 A
- Best of Countdown Live 2006–2007 A
- Countdown Live 2007–2008 Anniversary
- Premium Countdown Live 2008–2009 A
- Countdown Live 2009–2010 A: Future Classics
- Countdown Live 2010–2011 A: Do It Again
- Countdown Live 2011–2012 A: Hotel Love Songs
- Countdown Live 2012–2013 A: Wake Up
- Countdown Live 2013–2014 A
- Countdown Live 2014–2015 A: Cirque de Minuit
- Countdown Live 2015–2016 A: Made In Tokyo
- Countdown Live 2016–2017 A: Just The Beginning 20
- Countdown Live 2018–2019 A: Trouble
- Countdown Live 2019–2020: Promised Land A
- Countdown Live 2021–2022 A: 23rd Monster
- Countdown Live 2022–2023 A: Remember You
- Countdown Live 2023–2024 A: A Complete 25
- Countdown Live 2024–2025 A: I am Ayu
- Countdown Live 2025-2026 A: We are Ayu

== Filmography ==
Year	Title	Role	Notes
1993	Twins Teacher	Momo Tachibana	
1993	Battle Spirits Ryūko no Ken	Yuri Sakazaki	Voice role
1995	Sumomo mo Momo	Kuriko	
1995	Miseinen	Hitomi Tabata	
1995	Ladys Ladys!! Soucho Saigo no Hi	Misaki	
1995	Like Grains of Sand	Kasane Aihara	
1996	Gakko II		
2002	Tsuki ni Shizumu	Minamo	Hamasaki's song "Voyage" was the theme song for this movie.
2007	Distance Love	Herself	Short film based on her songs "Glitter" and "Fated".

== Video games/software ==
- Visual Mix Ayumi Hamasaki Dome Tour 2001 (PlayStation 2)
- A-TYPE ayumi hamasaki touch typing software (March 29, 2002, e frontier, Windows)

== See also ==
- List of awards received by Ayumi Hamasaki
- List of best-selling music artists
- List of best-selling music artists in Japan
- List of J-pop artists
