= Team Ayu =

Fan club of singer Ayumi Hamasaki

- Nickname: TA
- Formation: 1999
- Type: Fan club
- Owner: Avex
- Key people: Ayumi Hamasaki
- Website: Ayu App

Team Ayu is the official fan club of Japanese singer-songwriter Ayumi Hamasaki. Launched in 1999, it was initially used only for updates and fan discussions, but following 2001, its activities expanded to official newsletters, branded merchandise, concert ticket lotteries, and fan club exclusive tours.

In 2023, Avex launched the Team Ayu App, closing the website permanently.

== Overview ==
Team Ayu began in 1999, providing an online space for fans to connect with Hamasaki and other members. For a monthly subscription fee, members gained access to the singer's blog posts, as well as the online web store to purchase albums, DVDs/Blu-rays, and other merchandise. Over time, membership guaranteed early access to concert ticket lotteries, fan club-only merchandise, exclusive fan club versions of albums and DVD/Blu-ray releases, and the opportunity to send letters and questions to Hamasaki. At times, it has also been utilized to organize fan club-only tours, music, and giveaways.

Hamasaki has often used the fan club to share or respond to significant news ahead of making any official statements. This has sometimes led to conflict between media outlets and the singer, due to blog post quotes being shared in public news sources.

== Rainbow lyrics ==
"Rainbow" (2002)
The original demo of "Rainbow", released alongside the 2002 album of the same name.

"Rainbow" (2003)
The final version of "Rainbow", included in Hamasaki's 2003 compilation album.

In December 2002, Hamasaki released her sixth studio album: Rainbow. Early issues of the album included a URL address that linked to "Rainbow", an unfinished demo track. Due to fan feedback, Hamasaki decided to develop the song further for a future release; as this was based on public demand, the singer took the project one step further—a survey was sent out to Team Ayu members, requesting ideas for themes and lyrics. "I've never listened to everyone's voices directly and written lyrics from them before." Hamasaki commented later. "My goal wasn't to pick up and string together the words everyone gave me, but to turn what I felt when I saw the words that were sent to me into lyrics and music." In the end, over 100,000 fans took part in the survey. The track was included on the later released A Ballads compilation album.

The final version of the track included the English lyrics "No rain, can't get the rainbow", Hamasaki framing painful emotions as natural precursors to happiness and healing. It has since been performed in multiple concerts, such as being the new year songs for Countdown Live 2007–2008 Anniversary, and Countdown Live 2021–2022 A: 23rd Monster.

== Fanclub concerts and tours ==
=== Limited Team Ayu Live Tour (2003) ===
Hamasaki's first fan club tour took place after the release of A Ballads (2003), and consisted of fifteen concerts in seven locations. Footage from the Zepp Tokyo dates were officially released in the CD/DVD version of A Complete: All Singles (2008), albeit it included only ten of the reported sixteen performed songs. The unreleased sections include "We Wish" and "Fly High".

Setlist:

1. "Real Me"
2. "Poker Face"
3. "Depend on You"
4. "To Be"
5. "You (Northern Breeze)"
6. "Dolls"
7. "A Song for ×× (030213 Session #2)"
8. "Surreal"
9. "We Wish"
10. "Fly High"
11. "Evolution"
12. "Rainbow"
13. "Voyage" ~ "A Song is Born"
14. "+" (encore)
15. "Flower Garden" (encore)
16. "Who..." (encore)

=== Team Ayu Limited Live Tour 2015 (2015) ===
Promoted as Hamasaki's first fan club tour in twelve years, Team Ayu Limited Live Tour 2015 held eighteen dates over seven locations. Its setlist included "Sorrows", "Days", and an acoustic arrangement of "Heaven". Barks Japan praised the singer's "determination" and "passionate, powerful vocals" in their review, concluding: "There is a special view that can be seen when all the pieces in a live performance connect. The experience that Ayumi Hamasaki painted with TeamAyu at this final tour date is one of them." A recording of the Zepp Tokyo concert date was included on fan club exclusive versions of Made in Japan (2016).

Setlist:

1. "Sorrows"
2. "Startin'"
3. "Unite!"
4. "Last Minute"
5. "Heartplace"
6. "Days"
7. "Beloved"
8. "Summer Diary"
9. "Heaven"
10. "XOXO" ~ "Lelio" ~ "Sparkle" ~ "Feel the Love" ~ "You & Me"
11. "Love Song"
12. "Boys & Girls"
13. "The Show Must Go On"
14. "Replace" (encore)
15. "My All" (encore)

=== Team Ayu Limited Live Tour 2016 (2016) ===
Team Ayu Limited Live Tour 2016 ran for twenty dates between September and November, alternating its setlists between cities; additional songs swapped out from the setlist included "Part of Me", "Powder Snow", and "Life". A full recording of one of its concert dates was released in the Ayumi Hamasaki: Unreleased Live Box in 2023.

Setlist:

1. "We are the Queens"
2. "Last Angel'"
3. "Real Me"
4. "Shake It"
5. "Step You"
6. Interlude: "Jump!"
7. "Teddy Bear"
8. "Seasons"
9. "Key -eternal tie ver-" (a cappella)
10. Interlude: "Pieces of Seven"
11. "Tell All"
12. "Progress"
13. "The Show Must Go On"
14. "Today"
15. "Evolution" (encore)
16. "Boys & Girls" (encore)
17. "Now&4Eva" (encore)
18. "Red Line -For TA-" (double encore)

=== Special Showcase Xmas Eve 2020 (2020) ===
Limited TA Special Xmas Live 2020 was announced as a fan club exclusive concert in November 2020. The venue, Maihama Amphitheater at the Tokyo Disney resort, was to have limited seating due to COVID-19 pandemic restrictions; however, as infection numbers spiked during the holiday season, the concert was cancelled and changed to an online-only event. In response, Hamasaki changed the name to Special Showcase Xmas Eve 2020. Clips of the concert have been officially released on the artist's YouTube page, in the fan club-only release Best Live Box DVD/Blu-ray, and in fan club versions of A Ballads 2.

Setlist:

1. "M"
2. "Momentum'"
3. "Appears"
4. "Itsuka no Merry Christmas" (B'z cover)
5. "Shiroi Koibito Tachi" (Keisuke Kuwata cover)
6. "Close to You"
7. "Evolution"
8. "Unite!"
9. "Happening Here" (TRF cover)

=== Music for Life: Return (2021) ===
Due to the cancellation of Countdown Live 2020-2021 A: Music For Life in December 2020, Hamasaki organized Music for Life: Return as a replacement concert that reused some of its setlist and concept. Audience participation was fanclub-only; a stream was hosted by dTV, who also re-aired the concert the following year. Music for Life: Return was released on DVD and Blu-ray formats in September 2021.

Setlist:

1. "23rd Monster"
2. "We are the Queens"
3. "Dreamed a Dream"
4. "Return Road"
5. "Warning"
6. "(Miss)understood"
7. "Haru yo, Koi"
8. "Voyage"
9. "Evolution"
10. "A Song is Born"
11. "Progress"
12. "Mirrorcle World"
13. "Life" (encore)
14. "Love Song" (encore)
15. "My All" (encore)
16. "Today" (double encore)

=== Summer TA Party (2021) ===
Summer TA Party took place in August 2021, its audience participation limited due to COVID-19 pandemic restrictions. Despite a string of concert streams at the time, Hamasaki spoke of her desire for an offline-only experience; this included no official recordings. Some performances included guest appearances from Urata Naoya.

Setlist:

1. "W"
2. "Lelio"
3. "XOXO"
4. Interlude: "Ayu-mi-x Megamix"
5. "Hanabi"
6. "Hanabi Episode II"
7. "Fairyland"
8. "Summer Diary"
9. Interlude: "Jump!"
10. "Greatful Days" ~ "Glitter" ~ "Sunrise -Love is All-" ~ "Summer Love" ~ "You & Me"
11. "Sky High"
12. "Blue Bird"
13. "What is Forever Love" (featuring Urata Naoya)
14. "Another Song" (featuring Urata Naoya)
15. "Wow War Tonight" (featuring Urata Naoya)
16. "The Show Must Go On"
17. "July 1st"

=== Summer TA Party 2022 (2022) ===
Summer TA Party 2022 was a fan club exclusive tour, three dates taking place between July and August. As was the case for Summer TA Party the previous year, no concert streams or recordings were organized.

Setlist:

1. "Summer Again"
2. "Inspire"
3. "Survivor"
4. "Until that Day..."
5. "Out of Control"
6. "About You"
7. Interlude: "Kaleidoscope"
8. "Blossom"
9. "Crossroad"
10. "Fated"
11. Interlude: "Jump!"
12. "Greatful Days" ~ "Blue Bird" ~ "Glitter" ~ "Sunrise -Love is All-" ~ "Too Late" ~ "Summer Love" ~ "You & Me"
13. "Sky High"
14. "Now&4Eva"

=== Team Ayu Limited: Thank U Tour 2024 (2024) ===
After the completion of her 25th Anniversary Live Tour, Hamasaki embarked on the Team Ayu Limited: Thank U Tour 2024 from September 2 to October 2. The final date was recorded and later streamed to fan club members.

Setlist:

1. "A Song for ××"
2. "Aurora'"
3. "Last Angel"
4. MC
5. "Meaning of Love"
6. "Beloved"
7. "Story"
8. "Out of Control"
9. "Words"
10. "Heaven"
11. Interlude: Dance Medley
12. "Whatever" ~ "And Then" ~ "Still Alone" ~ "Angel" ~ "Lelio" ~ "Feel the Love"
13. "Bye-Bye"
14. "Present" (encore)
15. MC
16. "Boys & Girls" (encore)
17. "W" (encore)
18. "Red Line -For TA-" (double encore)

== Team Ayu editions ==
Hamasaki has often used a "Team Ayu exclusive" version of a product release to include fanclub-only content; this has included alternate album covers, music video recordings, bonus live tracks/performances, and in recent years, entire concert edits. The first album to have a fanclub boxset was Rock 'n' Roll Circus (2010); other albums that have had a boxset edition include Party Queen (2012) and Remember You (2023).

Examples of songs used in fanclub pre-releases include "Moon" (Rock 'n' Roll Circus, Love Songs) and "XOXO" (Colours); "Tell All" (A One) remains the only track limited entirely to a Team Ayu release.

=== Best Live Box A (2020) ===
Released in 2020, Best Live Box A included seven discs of concert content. Six of the discs were collections of various live performances, each disc dedicated to one of Hamasaki's previously released compilation albums. The chosen clips spanned between the years 2000 to 2016.

The seventh disc was a full recording of Premium Limited Live A: Natsu no Trouble, a promotional concert held on July 25, 2020. The setlist included the debut performance of "Ohia no Ki". No versions of the Best Live Box A were released publicly.

=== Music for Life: Return (Team Ayu edition) (2021) ===
Music for Life: Return included four additional performances in the fanclub release: "Mirrorcle World", "Life", "My All", and "Today". While recorded on the same day as the concert, these songs were not a part of the original broadcast. The fanclub release also cut a performance of "July 1st", which remains exclusive to the streamed version.

=== Unreleased Live Box (2024) ===
Hamasaki's Unreleased Live Box was a compilation release of previously unseen footage/edits of four concerts: Team Ayu Limited Live Tour 2016, Countdown Live 2016–2017 A: Just The Beginning, Arena Tour 2018: Power of Music 20th Anniversary, and Countdown Live 2018–2019 A: Trouble. Upon its announcement in 2023, the release was confirmed as preorder-only; each box was manufactured to order, rather than a batch made available for purchase via the fanclub store. No versions of the Unreleased Live Box were released publicly.

=== 25th Anniversary Live Tour (2024) ===
Held between July 8, 2023, and March 24, 2024, the 25th Anniversary Live Tour was split into three separate acts; this resulted in a 4-disc boxset release on October 2, 2024, the fourth disc being a collection of MC clips. A deluxe Team Ayu edition included a copy of Countdown Live 2023–2024 A: Complete 25.

The recorded setlists showcased sixty-eight songs overall, and included the debut live performances of "Untitled for Her...Story 2", "Criminal", and "Remember You". No versions or alternative edits of the 25th Anniversary Live Tour have been released publicly.
