= Dreamed a Dream =

2020 single by Ayumi Hamasaki

Single by Ayumi Hamasaki

from the album Remember You
- Released: July 31, 2020
- Recorded: 2020
- Genre: J-pop
- Length: 4:32
- Label: Avex Trax
- Songwriters: Ayumi Hamasaki (lyrics); Tetsuya Komuro (music)

Ayumi Hamasaki singles chronology
"Ohia no Ki" (2020)	"Dreamed a Dream" (2020)	"My All (Chinese version)" (2020)

Promotional video
- "Dreamed a Dream" on YouTube

"Dreamed a Dream" is a song by Japanese singer-songwriter Ayumi Hamasaki. It was released as a digital single only on July 31, 2020.

The song debuted at number 1 on the Oricon Daily Digital Singles Chart upon release, and peaked at number 22 on the Oricon Weekly Digital Singles Chart with sales of over 5,000 downloads.

A physical CD version of "Dreamed a Dream" was included in the limited edition of Hamasaki's latest concert DVD, Ayumi Hamasaki Countdown Live 2019–2020: Promised Land A, released on August 26, 2020. The song appears on the second bonus disc, alongside "Ohia no Ki".

== Background ==
On July 24, 2020, it was announced that a new song called "Dreamed a Dream" would be released as a digital single on July 31, 2020.

A short a cappella of the song was also uploaded to Hamasaki's official YouTube channel, encouraging fans to participate in the "#ayumix2020" remix challenge. The audio was available until the day of the song's release.

== Writing and production ==
The song's lyrics were written by Hamasaki while composition was handled by Tetsuya Komuro, who had previously composed songs such as "A Song Is Born", "Love Song" and "You & Me".

== Artwork ==
The artwork for "Dreamed a Dream" was first unveiled on Hamasaki's official website on July 24, 2020. The photo was taken by Kazuyoshi Shimomura and features the singer in a black latex bodysuit, depicting her as "strong". It serves as a contrast to the artwork of her previous single "Ohia no Ki", which was described to have a "gentle atmosphere".

== Release ==
"Dreamed a Dream" was released as a digital single on July 31, 2020, the same month as her previous single "Ohia no Ki". This marks the first time Hamasaki releases two digital singles in the same month.

A physical release of the song was included on the second bonus CD on TeamAyu/Mu-mo shop limited editions of Ayumi Hamasaki Countdown Live 2019–2020: Promised Land A, which was released on August 26, 2020. Unlike the digital version, the CD contains the song's instrumental. Hamasaki's previous single "Ohia no Ki" is also included on the disc.

== Promotion ==
The song was performed as a medley with "You & Me" at 2020 FNS Kayousai Natsu on August 26, 2020.

== Music video ==
On August 26, 2020, a "promotional clip", lasting three minutes and thirty-six seconds, was uploaded to Hamasaki's official YouTube channel. The video was directed by Masashi Muto and features a dance scene during heavy rain.

== Commercial performance ==
The song debuted at number one on the Oricon Daily Digital Single Chart with 2,942 copies sold. With three days' worth of sales due to its being released in the middle of the charting week, it entered the Oricon Weekly Digital Singles Chart at number 22, having sold 5,121 downloads.

"Dreamed a Dream" charted slightly higher on the Billboard Japan Top Download Songs chart, peaking at number 19. It rose three positions in its second week, peaking at number 16 on the chart.

== Track listing ==
=== Digital download ===
No.	Title	Length
1.	"Dreamed a Dream"	4:32

=== CD ===
No.	Title	Length
1.	"Ohia no Ki"	04:36
2.	"Dreamed a Dream"	04:32
3.	"Ohia no Ki (Instrumental)"	04:36
4.	"Dreamed a Dream (Instrumental)"	04:32
Total length:		18:16

== Charts ==
Chart (2020)	Peak position
Oricon Daily Digital Singles Chart	1
Oricon Weekly Digital Singles Chart	22
Billboard Japan Top Download Songs	16
