= Trouble (EP) =

EP by Ayumi Hamasaki
- Released: August 15, 2018
- Recorded: 2016–2018
- Genres: J-pop, rock
- Length: 22:57
- Label: Avex Music Creative

Ayumi Hamasaki chronology
Made in Japan (2016)	Trouble (2018)	Remember You (2023)

Singles from Trouble
- 1. "We Are the Queens" Released: September 30, 2016

Trouble (stylized in all caps) is the seventh extended play by Japanese singer Ayumi Hamasaki. It was released digitally in Japan on August 6, 2018, and was eventually released physically on August 15. The EP features five original tracks, with all the tracks written by Hamasaki herself.

Commercially, the album's first week sales in Japan are lower than her previous record, but reached number three on the Oricon Albums Chart. It is also Hamasaki's first original release not to have any songs featuring music videos.

To promote the album, she is set to embark on the ayumi hamasaki LIVE TOUR -TROUBLE- 2018–2019 A. The album also includes the previously mu-mo-exclusive song "Words" (2017) and the digital single "We Are the Queens" (2016), which was released in support of the mobile game Clash of Queens.

== Release ==
Trouble was released through streaming services on August 5, 2018, and was eventually released physically on August 15 in four different formats.

The first two formats are the CD only versions (Type A and Type B), which include the five tracks. They differ in the order of the tracks with Type B's tracklist being the same as Type A's but reversed.

The next formats are the limited edition DVD and Blu-ray bundles. These include the five tracks on one CD as well as a DVD/Blu-ray with type A including "ayumi hamasaki Just the beginning -20- TOUR 2017 2017.7.17 Osaka-Jo Hall" while Type B includes "ayumi hamasaki Just the beginning -20- TOUR 2017 2018.2.20 Okinawa Convention Center". Both sets include original photo cards and signed (print) heart-shaped clear keychains.

== Commercial performance ==
The EP was released digitally on August 6, prior to its physical release. It debuted at number twelve on Oricon Digital Albums Chart selling 856 units. Trouble debuted at number two on the Daily Oricon Albums Chart, just behind Perfume's sixth studio album Future Pop, selling 18,360 units. The EP then debuted at number three on the Weekly Oricon Albums Chart, selling 24,147 units. It also rose to number six on the Digital Albums Chart, selling an additional 1,476 units.

== Track listing ==
All lyrics are written by Ayumi Hamasaki.

CD edition
No.	Title	Music	Arranger	Length
1.	"We Are the Queens"	Kazuhiro Hara	Yuta Nakano	5:00
2.	"æternal"	Toru Watanabe	Atsushi Sato; Takehito Shimizu	4:40
3.	"Words"	Mayuko Maruyama	Atsushi Sato; Takehito Shimizu	5:06
4.	"W"	Kazuhiro Hara	Tasuku	3:26
5.	"The Way I Am"	Tetsuya Yukumi	Yuta Nakano	4:27
Total length:				22:57

Blu-ray / DVD 1: Just the Beginning -20- Tour 2017 2017.7.17 Osaka-Jo Hall
No.	Title	Length
1.	"Ourselves"
2.	"Warning"
3.	"Never Ever"
4.	"Because of You"
5.	"Pieces of Seven" (Interlude)
6.	"Virgin Road"
7.	"Distant Memories" (Interlude)
8.	"My Name's Women"
9.	"Appears"
10.	"Red & Blue" (Interlude)
11.	"Fly High"
12.	"Unite!"
13.	"Talkin' 2 Myself"
14.	"Mirrorcle World"
15.	"Voyage"
16.	"Movin' On Without You" (Hikaru Utada cover)
17.	"You & Me"
18.	"Surreal" / "Evolution" / "Surreal"
19.	"Boys & Girls"
20.	"Who..."
21.	"Love Song"

Blu-ray / DVD 2: Just the Beginning -20- Tour 2017 2018.2.20 Okinawa Convention Center
No.	Title	Length
1.	"I am..."
2.	"Moments"
3.	"A Song for XX"
4.	"Red & Blue" (Interlude)
5.	"Shake It"
6.	"Step You"
7.	"Distant Memories" (Interlude)
8.	"Last Minute"
9.	"Pieces of Seven" (Interlude)
10.	"Bold & Delicious"
11.	"Progress"
12.	"Flower"
13.	"Ourselves"
14.	"Ivy"
15.	"Feel the Love" / "XOXO" / "Lelio" / "You & Me" / "Audience"
16.	"Boys & Girls"
17.	"Love Song"
18.	"Seven Days War" (TM Network cover)

== Charts ==
Chart	Peak position	Debut sales	Total sales
Oricon Daily Chart	2	18,360	45,000 (13 weeks)
Oricon Weekly Chart	3	24,147	45,000 (13 weeks)
Oricon Yearly Chart	134	32,538	45,000 (13 weeks)
Oricon Weekly Digital Albums Chart	6	856	2,685 (3 weeks)
Total combined sales			47,685 (13 weeks)
