= Remember You (album) =

- CD and DVD, and digital download artwork

Studio album by Ayumi Hamasaki
- Released: January 25, 2023
- Recorded: 2020–2022
- Genre: J-pop
- Length: 53:30
- Label: Avex Trax

Ayumi Hamasaki chronology
Trouble (2018)	Remember You (2023)

Singles from Remember You
- 1. "Ohia no Ki" Released: July 5, 2020; 2. "Dreamed a Dream" Released: July 31, 2020; 3. "Haru Yo, Koi" Released: March 12, 2021; 4. "23rd Monster" Released: April 8, 2021; 5. "Nonfiction" Released: April 22, 2022; 6. "Summer Again" Released: July 1, 2022; 7. "Mask" Released: November 18, 2022

Remember You is the eighteenth studio album by Japanese recording artist Ayumi Hamasaki. Preceded by seven singles released from 2020 to 2022, it also marks her first studio album release in the Reiwa era.

To promote the release, Hamasaki named her New Year's Eve concerts after the album: Countdown Live 2022–2023 A: Remember You. Two concerts were held over December 30 and 31, with the latter date streamed through dTV. On December 28, it was announced that the song "(Not) Remember You" would be made available on January 1, 2023, as a pre-release album track on all streaming platforms. A second pre-release album track, "Just the Way You Are", was released on January 18 alongside a promotional clip featuring Kumamoto Pro-Wrestling, a member of the comedy duo Benishoga. After its release online, Japanese media widely covered the collaboration, praising the song as "a gentle, yet emotional ballad".

== Background ==
Hamasaki confirmed that she was working on her next studio album in April 2022, announcing it at the end of her Asia Tour: 24th Anniversary Special concert. Its release date was later changed due to issues with writer's block, moving from 2022 to January 25, 2023.

Remember You is an outlier in Hamasaki's standard release schedule, being seven years after her last studio album Made in Japan. After a string of singles across 2020 and 2021, the singer commented on her official Instagram account on March 2, 2022 that she was "receiving many exciting demos" from multiple composers. One of those demos was confirmed to be from Tetsuya Komuro; he was later credited as the composer and arranger for her single "Mask".

The singer spoke of struggling with the creative process and burnout during the creation of the album, as well as having anxiety figuring out "what Ayu would do" when preparing to perform on-stage. Remember you is also Hamasaki's first full album release since speaking about having impaired hearing in her right ear, being fully deaf in her left ear since the 2000s.

== Writing and production ==
Remember you includes Hajime Kato and Hisashi Koyama's first collaborations with Hamasaki, along with the return of Kazuhito Kikuchi, who last worked with Hamasaki for her 2006 album Secret. While Yuta Nakano arranged the majority of the album, both Atsushi Sato and Takehito Shimizu were brought back as arrangers for "23rd Monster", having worked with the singer for Made in Japan and Trouble.

Lyrically, Hamasaki explores various subjects through the album, touching upon themes of loneliness, dissonance, and self-doubt. "Dreamed a Dream" contrasts aggressive 90s-inspired beats with a contemplative set of lyrics; the singer openly reflects on her work, and the perceived limitations she has at this point in her career. This line of thinking is continued in the later-released "23rd Monster", Hamasaki accusing herself of having grown complacent before naming herself as the "monster" the title refers to ("Doing only what you have to, choosing surrender rather than fight/You're also a 'monster'"). The song continues to address both herself and faceless detractors, the heavy pop-rock foundation of the song underscoring the conclusion of needing to take back control of her own career.

Hamasaki wrote and recorded the album between concert tours, which included TA Summer Party 2022, Asia Tour 2021-2022 A: 23rd Monster, and Countdown Live 2022–2023: Remember You. The creative process was noted to be rigorous, with Hamasaki at one point posting that "Just because a song is finished, doesn't mean it'll see the light of day", and "I wonder how many times I've created and destroyed things over the past year, and how many songs there will be when I'm done with all of them". Ultimately, while the initial announcement of the album listed 12 tracks, the final tracklist confirmed 14 tracks in total.

== Artwork ==
First unveiled on December 23, 2022, the cover art features Hamasaki in the Peninsula Suite of the Tokyo Peninsula Hotel, looking into the distance against a backdrop of the city nightscape. Notably, Hamasaki spoke of often staying at the hotel over the two years writing the album.

The photographer is credited as Masayuki Kamo, who also shot the cover visuals for 21st Anniversary: Power of A^3.

== Release and critical reception ==
Professional ratings
Review scores
Source	Rating
AllMusic	4.5/5 stars

Remember You was released on January 25, 2023. Six different formats were advertised: a CD, CD+DVD, CD+Blu-ray, digital download, and a double-disc edition—CD+2DVD+Goods, and a CD+2Blu-ray+Goods set. The latter edition of the album includes the singer's A-Nation Online 2020 performance stage, which showcased a live rendition of the 'despair trilogy'—"Vogue", "Far Away", and "Seasons".

The TeamAyu version of the album included a 92-page photobook, described as a mix of a new photoshoot and off-shots from 2020 to 2022. The photoshoot made use of haute couture pieces commissioned specifically for Hamasaki.

Remember You received glowing reviews from Neil Z. Yeung of AllMusic and Subaru Tomioka of Cinra. Yeung praised Hamasaki's vocals and the arrangements on the ballad tracks, concluding that Remember You was a triumph for the singer and "one of her best albums". Tomioka dubbed the album as "powerful and precious", complimenting Hamasaki's continued lyrical ability. Tomoyuki Mori of RealSound also wrote a positive overview, appreciating that the album served as a reminder of Hamasaki's unwavering ability to "stick to her own will", both for herself and her fans.

== Commercial performance ==
Remember You debuted at number 6 on the Weekly Oricon Albums Chart, selling 11,317 copies. It had a peak of number 3 on its initial release date.

With Remember You's performance, Hamasaki became the female artist with the most albums to reach the top 10—a total of 54. She had previously tied for first place with Seiko Matsuda.

The album was also successful throughout many parts of Asia. Upon release, the Taiwanese version of Remember You topped the G-Music East Asian Chart. The album spent 2 non-consecutive weeks at number 1 in Taiwan, and reached number 1 on the KKBOX Japanese Album Chart in Singapore.

== Track listing ==
All lyrics are written by Ayumi Hamasaki, except for track 9 written by Yumi Matsutoya.

Remember You track listing
No.	Title	Music	Arranger(s)	Length
1.	"Nonfiction"	Hisashi Koyama	Tasuku	3:49
2.	"(Not) Remember You"	Hajime Kato	Nakano	3:42
3.	"Dreamed a Dream"	Tetsuya Komuro	Nakano	4:32
4.	"23rd Monster"	Kazuhiro Hara	Takehito Shimizu; Atsushi Sato	3:46
5.	"Summer Again"	Kato	Tasuku	4:00
6.	"Ray of Truth"	Nakano	Nakano	1:35
7.	"Remember You"	Tetsuya Yukumi	Nakano	4:24
8.	"Ohia no Ki" (オヒアの木)	Kazuhito Kikuchi	Yuta Nakano	4:37
9.	"Haru yo, Koi" (春よ、来い; Yumi Matsutoya cover)	Yumi Matsutoya	Nakano	5:02
10.	"Taskinson"	Tasuku	Tasuku	1:58
11.	"Mask"	Komuro	Komuro	4:28
12.	"Vibees"	Kato	Tasuku	3:16
13.	"Nonfiction" (Yohanne Simon remix)	Koyama	Yohanne Simon	4:22
14.	"Just the Way You Are"	Hara	Nakano	3:52
Total length:				53:30

Regular Blu-ray / Regular DVD / TeamAyu DVD/Blu-ray 1
No.	Title	Director(s)	Length
1.	"Ohia no Ki (オヒアの木)" (Video Clip)	Kazuyoshi Shimomura
2.	"Dreamed a Dream" (Video Clip)	Masashi Muto
3.	"23rd Monster" (Video Clip)	Hideaki Sunaga
4.	"Haru yo, koi (春よ、来い)" (Video Clip)	Shimomura
5.	"Nonfiction" (Video Clip)	Sunaga
6.	"Summer Again" (Video Clip)	Sunaga
7.	"Mask" (Video Clip)	Sunaga
8.	"Ohia no Ki (オヒアの木)" (Making of)
9.	"Dreamed a Dream" (Making of)
10.	"23rd Monster" (Making of)
11.	"Haru yo, koi (春よ、来い)" (Making of)
12.	"Nonfiction" (Making of)
13.	"Summer Again" (Making of)
14.	"Mask" (Making of)

TeamAyu Blu-ray/DVD 2: a-nation online 2020
No.	Title	Length
1.	"Opening Movie" (Directed by Kunihiro Kawashima)
2.	"Dreamed a Dream"
3.	"Startin'"
4.	"Jump!" (Interlude)
5.	"Get in Gear!" (Interlude)
6.	"Vogue"
7.	"Far Away"
8.	"Seasons"
9.	"Ayu-mi-x Mega Mix -a-nation 2020-" (Interlude)
10.	"Greatful Days～Glitter～Independent～Sunrise Love is All～You & Me"
11.	"Blue Bird"
12.	"July 1st"

== Charts ==
=== Weekly charts ===
Weekly chart performance for Remember You
Chart (2023)	Peak position
Japanese Albums (Oricon)	6
Japanese Combined Albums (Oricon)	7
Japanese Hot Albums (Billboard Japan)	6
Taiwanese J-pop Albums (G-Music)	1

=== Monthly charts ===
Monthly chart performance for Remember You
Chart (2023)	Peak position
Japanese Albums (Oricon)	26

=== Year-end charts ===
Year-end chart performance for Remember You
Chart (2023)	Peak position
Japanese Albums (Oricon)	242
Taiwanese J-pop Albums (G-Music)	1
