= Surreal (Ayumi Hamasaki song) =

- CD only artwork.

Single by Ayumi Hamasaki

from the album Duty
- Released: 27 September 2000
- Recorded: 2000
- Studio: Avex Studios (Tokyo, Japan)
- Genre: Rock
- Length: 4:44
- Label: Avex Trax; Avex Taiwan; Rhythm Republic
- Songwriter: Ayumi Hamasaki
- Producer: Max Matsuura

Ayumi Hamasaki singles chronology
"Seasons" (2000)	"Surreal" (2000)	"Audience" (2000)

Official Music Video
- "Surreal" on YouTube

"Surreal" (stylized in all caps) is a song by Japanese recording artist Ayumi Hamasaki, taken from her third studio album Duty (2000). It was written by Hamasaki and produced by Max Matsuura. The song is a rock with elements of alternative rock. "Surreal" describes Hamasaki's madness and sense of confusion, while the themes of "Surreal" are based on Hamasaki's concept of loneliness, chaos, confusion, and the burden of her responsibilities, aimed mostly toward her public image as a recording artist. It was released as the fourth single from the album on 27 September 2000 by Avex Trax and Avex Taiwan.

Critical reception towards "Surreal" has been positive; the majority of critics commended the songwriting and musical delivery, and highlighted it as an album and career standout. In Japan, "Surreal" became her sixth number one on the Oricon Singles Chart, and also reached the top spot on the Japanese Count Down TV chart. "Surreal" was certified platinum by the Recording Industry Association of Japan (RIAJ) for shipments of 500,000 units. Released as a DVD Single in December 2000, it reached number three on the Oricon DVD Chart.

The accompanying music video was directed by Wataru Takeishi, featuring Hamasaki walking along a beach front. With mysterious lighting hovering over several objects, she enters a jungle-like room to find a clone of herself; the clone wears the same outfit for the Duty and "Surreal" photo shoot. "Surreal" has been included on several concert tours and New Year Countdown shows held and hosted by Hamasaki, and has featured on majority of her greatest hits compilations.

== Background and composition ==
"Surreal" was written by Hamasaki, composed by Kazuhito Kikuchi, and produced by Max Matsuura. Japanese band HΛL arranged the song, which included instrumentation of guitars, keyboards, and a drum machine. "Surreal" was one of three songs from the Duty album composed by Kikuchi, the other two being "Vogue" and "Far Away". "Surreal" was his last collaboration with Hamasaki until composing her songs "About You" and "Replace" from her sixth studio album, My Story (2004). It was selected as the fourth single from Duty and was released in Japan on 27 September 2000 by Avex Trax, the same date Duty was released. The Maxi CD features the original track, the instrumental version, seven remixes of the track "Duty", and one remix of Hamasaki's single "Seasons". A DVD single and VHS was released on 13 December 2000 by Avex Trax in Japan, with a full-frontal body image of Hamasaki that is similar to the artwork of Duty. Both formats feature the music video of "Surreal" along with the television advertisement for Duty and the video making for "Surreal". Avex released it as a digital EP. (Note: When accessing different countries on the iTunes Store, replace the country acronym (for example, NZ) with the desired country acronym.)

"Surreal" is a rock song that borrows influences from numerous genres including alternative rock. The song was noted for its musical similarities to other tracks from Duty. "Surreal" describes Hamasaki's madness and sense of confusion, while the themes of "Surreal" and other tracks from Duty are based on Hamasaki's concept of loneliness, chaos, confusion, and the burden of her responsibilities, aimed mostly towards her public image as a recording artist. Based on her songwriting, she described her feelings after the writing all the tracks from Duty as "unnatural" and was constantly "nervous" for the final result. A reviewer from Amazon.co.jp commented on all the tracks on Duty and praised the songs for embracing a "healing effect" that was absent on Hamasaki's two previous studio albums.

== Reception ==
=== Critical response ===
"Surreal" received favorable reception from contemporary music critics. Alexey Eremenko, who wrote her extended biography at AllMusic, highlighted the song as an album and career standout. A reviewer from Yahoo! GeoCities singled out "Surreal" and album tracks "End of the World", and "Seasons" as highlights. Morimasa from Nifty.com was positive towards the tracks "Surreal" and "Audience". He liked how the tracks were placed in the middle of the album, which he believed highlighted the musical and lyrical delivery. Hamasaki hosted an online voting poll for fans to choose their favourite tracks to be featured on her Ayumi Hamasaki 15th Anniversary Tour Best Live Tour, and "Surreal" was featured on the list. The song was remixed as an orchestral song for her remix album ayu-mi-x III Acoustic Orchestra Version (2003), and was commended alongside other tracks for its "rich melody".

=== Commercial performance ===
In Japan, "Surreal" entered at number one on the Oricon Singles Chart in Japan, her fifth number one. It lasted for seven weeks on the chart, selling 417,210 units, and is her seventeenth best selling single according to Oricon. The DVD release of "Surreal" reached number three on the Oricon DVD Chart and spent ten weeks in the top fifty. It is her ninth best selling DVD and her third best selling single in DVD format; the other two are "Vogue/Far Away/Seasons" and "Voyage". "Surreal" was certified platinum by the Recording Industry Association of Japan (RIAJ) for shipments of 500,000 units. "Surreal" entered at number one on the Japanese Count Down TV Chart. This became her fifth number one on that chart. The song slipped to eight in its second week, and lasted seven weeks in the chart, her lowest spanning since "Fly High" which lasted six. In the annual 2000 Count Down TV chart, "Surreal" was placed at number sixty-three.

== Music video ==
The overall appearance of "Surreal" is based on the photo shoot of Duty. The clone of Hamasaki (above) uses props and outfits from the photo shoot.

The accompanying music video was directed by Wataru Takeishi. The video opens with Hamasaki asleep, dreaming about herself waking up on a rocky surface on a beach front. Takeishi required a drone to shoot scenes of the video in higher places, including the scenes of cliffs and an abandoned ship in the sea. After failing to achieve this with the drone, Avex hired a pilot to fly a helicopter. Throughout the video, it features intercut scenes with Hamasaki on the top of a rocky hill singing the song. Due to technical difficulties and interruptions of Hamasaki during the helicopter scenes, Hamasaki and Takeishi had to re-shoot the scenes several times to make it look right.

Hamasaki begins to wander around the rocky shore, and ends up walking into a jungle with a mysterious light surrounding certain objects and plants. Hamasaki constantly dreams about a "cute panther girl" in a leopard-print cat suit, similar to the outfit from the Duty and "Surreal" photo shoot. As Hamasaki walks into a garden with a fence surrounding it, blurry scenes of the woman in the cat suit emerges. It is revealed that the woman is a clone of Hamasaki, laying seductively on the ground, staring at the original Hamasaki. During some scenes, the clones's eyes start turning red. The clone disappears, and the original Hamasaki and her surroundings start to disintegrate with the mysterious light absorbing the disintegration. The final scene has Hamasaki waking up in her room, believing to be safe, until turning her head and returning to the beach front she was at.

The overall appearance of "Surreal" was primarily based on Hamasaki's photo shoot for Duty and "Surreal". The CD artwork for "Surreal" featured Hamasaki with the exact look from the video, but coloured black and white with a red heart on her upper cheek. A coloured body shot of the CD artwork was released for the DVD and VHS. The music video was included on the DVD and VHS formats of "Surreal". Seth Figlerowicz from Jame-World.com reviewed the music video, and stated positively about the "wonder landscapes" and storyline; "The entire PV really fits the atmosphere of the song." The music video also appeared on Hamasaki's DVD compilation box sets: A Clips Vol.2 (2002), Complete Clip Box (2004), A Clip Box 1998–2011 (2011), and the bonus DVD version with A Complete: All Singles.

== Live performances and other appearances ==
"Surreal" has been included in all of Hamasaki's New Years countdown concerts up until the Ayumi Hamasaki Countdown Live 2006–2007 A. (Note: All New Years concert links are listed below; 2000–2001 A, 2001–2002, 2002–2003, 2004–2005, 2005–2006, and 2006–2007.) "Surreal" has been included on several of Hamasaki's national and Asian concert tours. The song had made its debut tour performance on Hamasaki's 2001 Ayumi Hamasaki Dome Tour 2001 A. Since then, "Surreal" has been included on Hamasaki's Ayumi Hamasaki Arena Tour 2002 A, 2002 Stadium Tour and 2005 My Story Tour. The song's last live performance was her 2014 Ayumi Hamasaki Premium Showcase: Feel the love, in which was supported by her 2014 studio album Colours. (Note: All arena tours appearances are listed below; Stadium Tour 2002, Arena Tour 2006, Tour of Secret, and the final performance from Premium Showcase: Feel the Love.) "Surreal" has been included on two greatest hits compilations, which are A Best (2002), and A Complete: All Singles (2008).

"Surreal" has been remixed by several professional disc jockeys and producers, and has appeared on several remix albums by Hamasaki. This list is: the Thunderpuss and Peter Rauhofer remix on ayu-mi-x III Non-Stop Mega Mix Version (2001) and Ayu-mi-x 4 + Selection Non-Stop Mega Mix Version (2002), the Time a Go-Go remix on Super Eurobeat Presents Ayu-ro Mix 2 (2001), the Marc et Claude remix on Cyber Trance Presents Ayu Trance (2002), the A Sentimental remix on Rmx Works from Super Eurobeat Presents Ayu-ro Mix 3 (2003), and the Dima Euro remix on Ayu-mi-x 7 Presents Ayu-ro Mix 4 (2011). The orchestral acoustic remix was included on her third orchestral remix album, ayu-mi-x III Acoustic Orchestra Version (2001).

== Track listing ==
- CD single
1. "Surreal" (Original Mix) – 4:44
2. "Duty" (Eric Kupper Big Room Mix Radio Edit) – 3:53
3. "Seasons" (Bump & Flex Radio Edit) – 3:41
4. "Duty" (Under Lounge Club Mix) – 5:52
5. "Duty" (Nicely Nice Remix) – 4:34
6. "Duty" (Steppin' Dub Mix) – 5:27
7. "Duty" (Sky Modulation Mix) – 8:30
8. "Duty" (Dub's Mellowtech 002 Remix) – 8:41
9. "Duty" (Genius Beat Mix) – 5:34
10. "Surreal" (Instrumental) – 4:42
- 12 inch Vinyl
1. "Duty" (Eric Kupper Big Room Mix Radio Edit) – 3:53
2. "Seasons" (Bump & Flex Radio Edit) – 3:41
3. "Surreal" (Original Mix) – 4:44
- VHS/DVD Single
1. "Surreal" (music video)
2. "Duty TV advertisement commercial"
3. "Surreal" (making of video)

== Personnel ==
- Ayumi Hamasaki – songwriting, vocal production
- Naoto Suzuki – production
- Naoya Akimoto – electric guitar, bass guitar
- HΛL – keyboards
- Kazuhito Kikuchi – composition
- Max Matsuura – executive producer, vocal production, additional production
- Shinichi Hara – art direction
- Shigeru Kasai – design
- Toru Kumazawa – photographer
- Koji Matsumoto – fashion director
- Hiroyuki Ishii and Takako Mishima – stylist
- CHIKA – hair assistant and make-up stylist
- Kanako Miura – nail artist

== Charts ==
Chart (2000)	Peak position
Japan Daily (Oricon)	1
Japan Weekly (Oricon)	1
Japan Count Down TV Chart (TBS)	1
Japan Count Down TV Annual Chart (TBS)	63

== Certification ==
Region	Certification	Certified units/sales
Japan (RIAJ)	Platinum	417,210
