= Mask (Ayumi Hamasaki song) =

2021 single by Ayumi Hamasaki

Single by Ayumi Hamasaki

from the album Remember You
- Released: November 18, 2022
- Recorded: 2022
- Genre: J-pop
- Length: 4:47
- Label: Avex Trax
- Composer: Tetsuya Komuro
- Lyricist: Ayumi Hamasaki

Ayumi Hamasaki singles chronology
"Summer Again" (2022)	"Mask" (2022)	"Jidai" (2024)

Music video
- "Mask" on YouTube

"Mask" is a song by Japanese singer-songwriter Ayumi Hamasaki. It is the seventh and final single from her studio album Remember You (2023).

The song peaked at number four on the Oricon Daily Digital Singles Chart upon release, and ranked at number twenty-four on the Oricon Weekly Digital Singles Chart.

== Background ==
After announcing work on her next studio album, Hamasaki shared that she had received "many exciting demos" via her official Instagram account. One of the demos was confirmed to be from composer Tetsuya Komuro, who the singer previously worked with on songs such as "A Song is Born" "You & Me", and "Dreamed a Dream".

Through the rest of the year, Hamasaki spoke on struggling with the creative process, suffering from writer's block while working towards the original album release date of autumn 2022. Eventually, the album was delayed to January 2023.

On November 5, Hamasaki thanked staff for "working with me for long periods of time, through trial and error, to create so many different versions" and spoke positively of an upcoming new song. "Mask" was then announced on November 14, with a November 18 release date.

== Writing and production ==
"Mask" was the first Komuro arrangement that Hamasaki had used in twelve years, the last time being for her single "Crossroad". The track begins with a synthesized melody overlaid with keyboard-led chords, evolving into a retro dance number; it is described as being "sad but powerful", the dissonant lyrics and composition at odds with the otherwise upbeat tone. The official statement on the single describes the song as a soundtrack for the "transition between autumn and winter"; Hamasaki herself encouraged listeners to "enter the world of TK's sounds, my words, and the chill of winter".

The lyrical content of the song can be said to be Hamasaki's own personal reflections, echoing her previous single "23rd Monster"'s sentiment of frustration at herself for inaction and apathy. "When did I become the type of person who could put on a smile/and line up so many excuses for what I couldn't do?" she asks, later confessing that it is easier to listen to "happy music" than face discomfort. The track was lauded by critics for bringing the "immortal" Showa sound to the Reiwa era.

== Cover art ==
The cover art is credited to Kazutaka Nakamura, who had worked previously with Hamasaki for her Love EP (2012). It shows Hamasaki in an unbuttoned jacket suit, looking directly at the viewer. Oricon News described it as a "bold, elegant" shot, considering it a dignified visual concept for the single. Other outlets complimented the "sexy, confident" nature it lent to the release.

== Music video ==
The music video was done in collaboration with TeamLabs, Hamasaki and her stage troupe recording it entirely at their Tokyo venue. The singer's scenes at first displayed her wearing a white trenchcoat, then switching to a white latex rubber look with slicked back hair; the ending shots were particularly praised, Hamasaki standing in the orchid room while being blindfolded. "It's a work you won't be able to take your eyes away from until that meaningful ending" wrote The First Times, while Music Voice Japan called it "visually stunning".

Hamasaki had previously visited TeamLabs in early 2022, and had kept it in mind to use for a later work after being impressed by the art installations. "It's a one of a kind visual art," she wrote as the music video debuted, crediting a special thank you to TeamLab Planets.

== Promotion ==
The song was performed at Hamasaki's Countdown Live 2022-2023 A: Remember You concert on December 31, 2022. In 2023, it was used in advertisements for Rhythm's R-Face BFT Pack product.

== Charts ==
Chart (2021)	Peak position
Oricon Weekly Digital Singles Chart	24
Billboard Japan Top Download Songs	25
