= Seasons (Ayumi Hamasaki song) =

2000 single by Ayumi Hamasaki

Single by Ayumi Hamasaki

from the album Duty
- Released: June 7, 2000
- Recorded: 2000
- Genre: J-pop
- Length: 4:21
- Label: Avex Trax
- Songwriter: Ayumi Hamasaki
- Producer: Max Matsuura

Ayumi Hamasaki singles chronology
"Far Away" (2000)	"Seasons" (2000)	"Surreal" (2000)

Official Music Video
- "Seasons" on YouTube

Trilogy
- "Vogue～Far Away～Seasons" on YouTube

"Seasons" (capitalized as "SEASONS") is a song by Japanese recording artist Ayumi Hamasaki for her third studio album, Duty (2000). It was written by Hamasaki, while production was handled by Avex Trax chairman Max Matsuura. It premiered on June 7, 2000, as the third single from the album. The song is the final part of a trilogy from Duty; the other two singles from the trilogy being "Vogue" and "Far Away".

Musically, "Seasons" is a pop ballad. The lyrics highlights theme of the hopelessness, describing Hamasaki's future. Upon its release, the track garnered rave reviews from music critics, who praised Hamasaki's songwriting, the song's composition and selected it as an album and career stand out track. It also achieved success in Japan, peaking at number one on the Oricon Singles Chart and on the TBS Count Down TV chart. "Seasons" has sold over 1.367 million units in Japan, making it Hamasaki's second best selling single. It also won the Best Original Song and Lyrics Award at the 42nd Japan Record Awards.

The accompanying music video for "Seasons" was directed by Wataru Takeishi, and leads on from the videos of "Vogue" and "Far Away"; it features Hamasaki in a black gown in the middle of a post-apocalypse city. Both the music video and the song has appeared on several compilations by Hamasaki, including A Best (2001) and A Complete: All Singles (2008). For additional promotion, the song was featured on several concert tours by Hamasaki.

== Background and release ==
"Seasons"
A 30-second sample of "Seasons". A J-pop song that was cited by her fans as one of her most lyrically heartbreaking songs to date.

"Seasons"" was recorded in 2000 at Nowadays Studios and Prime Sound Studios in Tokyo, Japan. As part of the trilogy set with "Vogue" and "Far Away", "Seasons" highlights theme of hopelessness and predicts Hamasaki's future. With this, "Vogue" details Hamasaki's presence, whilst "Far Away" discusses her past. Based on her song writing, she described her feelings after the writing all the tracks from Duty as "unnatural" and was constantly "nervous" for the final result. A staff reviewer from Amazon Japan noticed that the trilogy set had a "healing effect" that was absent on Hamasaki's two previous studio albums.

"Seasons" was written by Hamasaki, while production was handled by Japanese businessman and musician Max Matsuura. The song was composed by long-term collaborators Dai Nagao, whilst arrangement was handled by Naoto Suzuki. For the track's instrumentation, Suzuki played the keyboards, Naoki Hayashibe played the guitar, Takahiro Iida programmed and mixed the final composition, and Junko Hirotani provided background vocals.

"Seasons" was selected as the second single from Duty and was released on June 7, 2000, by Avex Trax. The maxi CD of the single contains the original composition and its instrumental version, plus nine remixes. As a single from the Duty trilogy, which included Hamasaki's singles "Vogue" and "Far Away", the singles were released as a DVD single and VHS. It included the three mini-music videos, alongside the making-of videos and a TV commercial. The CD and digital cover sleeve have an image of Hamasaki holding a polaroid of the cover artwork for "Far Away". The song's title, "Seasons", is present on cover. The standalone CD cover was used as the digital EP cover for the iTunes Store and Amazon.com.

== Critical response ==
"Seasons" received favourable reviews from music critics. Alexey Eremenko, who had written her extended biography at AllMusic, highlighted the song as an album and career stand out track. Morimosa from Nifty.com complimented Hamasaki's songwriting in the song. A staff reviewer from Yahoo! GeoCities was positive towards the song, and selected it as one of the best tracks from the album. The song's critical success earned it the Best Original Song and Lyrics Award at the 42nd Japan Record Awards.

Hamasaki hosted an online voting poll for fans to choose their favourite tracks to be featured on her Ayumi Hamasaki 15th Anniversary Tour Best Live Tour. As a result, "Seasons" was included on the list. In early 2014, in honor of Hamasaki's sixteenth-year career milestone, Japanese website Goo.ne.jp hosted a poll for fans to rank their favourite songs by Hamasaki out of thirty positions; the poll was held in only twenty-four hours, and thousands submitted their votes. As a result, "Seasons" was ranked at the top spot. According to their separate review, the website commented on its win; "'Seasons' was an instant classic... Fans cite the song's heartfelt and resonating lyrics as some of her best." In 2016, the song was covered by Gackt in a more rock-arranged version.

== Commercial performance ==
In Japan, "Seasons" was a success on the Oricon Singles Chart. The single debuted at number one on the Oricon Singles Chart, with 552,730 copies sold in its first week. The single stayed at the top of the chart for two consecutive weeks, selling 204,510 copies on its second charting week. It slid to number two the following week, logging sales of 155,560 units. The single spent an additional two weeks in the top ten before dropping out in its sixth week. "Seasons" lasted for 21 weeks on the chart, and sold 1.367 million units by the end of 2000; this made it the fifth best-performing single of the year and the third best-performing single of the year by a female artist behind Mai Kuraki's "Love, Day After Tomorrow" and Hikaru Utada's "Wait & See (Risk)."

"Seasons" is Hamasaki's best selling single; as of today, the song is Hamasaki's second best selling single according to Oricon Style. (Note: According to Hamasaki's profile on Oricon Style, her 1999 EP A is listed as her best selling single; "Seasons" is listed at second. However, because the single includes four original tracks, with an additional eight remixes, it is generally deemed an extended play. As a result, "Seasons", which is a sole single track from the maxi CD, is Hamasaki's best selling recognized single.) The DVD single, released under the title of Vogue/Far Away/Seasons reached number one on the Oricon DVD Chart, spending seventeen weeks in the top fifty. It is Hamasaki's second best selling DVD single, and her eighth best seller overall. "Seasons" was certified million by the Recording Industry Association of Japan (RIAJ) for shipments of one million units. In August 2014, the song was certified gold by RIAJ for digital sales of 100,000 units. The single entered at number one on Japan's TBS Count Down TV Chart; it stayed there for two consecutive weeks, and lasted 21 weeks in the chart. It was placed at number seven on their Annual Count Down TV chart in 2000.

== Music video ==
The accompanying music video was directed by Wataru Takeishi. Because the music video was part of the trilogy set with "Vogue" and "Far Away", only a portion of the song was shot for the video. As a result, the video for "Seasons" lasts for two minutes and 27 seconds. Two outtake shots from the "Vogue" video were then used for the artworks of "Far Away" and "Seasons". The music video was included on the DVD and VHS formats of "Seasons". The music video also appeared on Hamasaki's DVD compilation box sets: A Clips Vol.2 (2002), Complete Clip Box (2004), A Clip Box 1998–2011 (2011), and the bonus DVD version with A Complete: All Singles.

=== Synopsis ===
The video opens with a cover of a photo album, superimposed with a scene of two children from the videos of "Vogue" and "Far Away". It then has a blurry image of Hamasaki in the post-apocalyptic city, which has now left behind a series of hills. As Hamasaki walks towards the camera, the photo album opens with the city before its destruction. Hamasaki stands in the middle of a grainy surface, with projectile flames coming from underneath the ground. As she sings, scenes from the "Vogue" and "Far Away" videos appear in the photo album. She walks through the hill surface, finding the photo album the two children left behind. She opens the book, and witnesses the "Vogue" video. The final scene has Hamasaki close the book, which its back cover is a title-less shot of the artwork to "Vogue".

== Live performances and other appearances ==
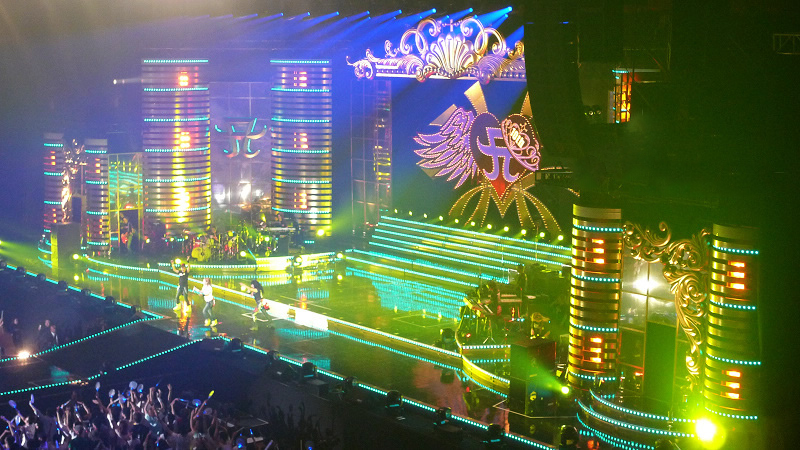
"Seasons" was included on several concert tours by Hamasaki, including her 2008 10th Anniversary Tour in Asia.

Hamasaki has performed "Seasons" on several concert tours throughout Asia. The song was performed on Hamasaki's 2000 concert in Japan, where it was included during the first segment. It was included on the live DVD, released on September 27, 2000. Hamasaki performed "Seasons" at the 51st NHK Kōhaku Uta Gassen on December 31, 2000. It was performed on her 2000-2001 New Years countdown concert tour, where it was included during the last segment. It was included on the live DVD, released on June 20, 2001. It was performed on her Dome Tour (2001), where it was included during the last segment. It was included on the live DVD, released on December 12, 2001. It was performed on her Stadium tour (2002), where it was included as an encore track. It was included on the live DVD, released on January 29, 2003.

It was performed on her A Museum tour (2004), where it was included as an encore track. It was included on the live DVD, released on February 25, 2004. It was performed on her Tours of Secret concert tour (2007), where it was included as an encore track. It was included on the live DVD, released on March 12, 2008. The song was performed on her Power of Music tour (2011) in Japan, where it was included in the trilogy segment with "Vogue" and "Far Away". It was included on the live DVD, released on March 21, 2012. The song was performed on her 15th Anniversary tour (2013) in Japan, where it was included in the trilogy segment with "Vogue" and "Far Away". It was included on the live DVD, released on October 30, 2013. The song has been included on three of her greatest hits compilations: A Best (2002), A Complete: All Singles (2008), and A Summer Best (2012). The 2000 vol. 2 live performance was included on Hamasaki's live DVD compilation, A 50 Singles: Live Selection (2011), and the DVD edition of A Summer Best.

"Seasons" has been remixed by several professional disc jockeys and producers, and has appeared on several remix albums by Hamasaki: the Hex Hector and Bump and Flex remix on ayu-mi-x III Non-Stop Mega Mix Version (2001) and Ayu-mi-x 4 + Selection Non-Stop Mega Mix Version (2002), the A Eurobeat remix on Super Eurobeat Presents Ayu-ro Mix 2 (2001), and the John O'Callaghan (musician) remix on Ayu-mi-x 7 Presents Ayu Trance 4 (2011). The orchestral acoustic remix, and its instrumental version, was included on her third orchestral remix album, ayu-mi-x III Acoustic Orchestra Version (2001).

== Credits and personnel ==
Credits adapted from the singles liner notes:

- Ayumi Hamasaki – song writing, vocals, background vocals
- Max Matsuura – producing
- Naoto Suzuki – arranging, keyboards
- Dai "D.A.I." Nagao – composing
- HΛL – arranging, keyboards, programming, mixing
- Naoki Hayashibe – guitar
- Junko Hirotani – background vocals
- Takahiro Iida – programming
- Atsushi Hattori – mixing
- Shinichi Hara – art direction
- Shigeru Kasai – design
- Toru Kumazawa – photographer
- Koji Matsumoto – fashion director
- Koji Matsumoto and Takako Mishima – stylist
- CHIKA – hair assistant and make-up stylist
- Kanako Miura – nail artist

== Track listings and formats ==
- Japanese CD single
1. "Seasons" – 4:21
2. "Seasons" (Acoustic Orchestral remix) – 3:36
3. "To Be" (Acoustic Orchestral remix) – 5:25
4. "Seasons" (So Happy So Sad remix) – 6:58
5. "Seasons" (Jonathan Peters Radio mix) – 3:55
6. "Seasons" (Ray of Light remix) – 6:35
7. "Seasons" (Neutralized: Final Attack remix) – 4:45
8. "Seasons" (B-Z Blue Sunbeam remix) – 6:19
9. "Seasons" (Dub's Rain of Duv remix) – 4:35
10. "Seasons" (Instrumental) – 4:21
11. "Ever Free" (HAL's Mix 2000) – 4:18
- Vogue/Far Away/Seasons DVD single
1. "Vogue" (music video)
2. "Far Away" (music video)
3. "Seasons" (music video)
4. TV commercial for DVD single
5. "Vogue" (making of the music video)
6. "Far Away" (making of the music video)
7. "Seasons" (making of the music video)
8. Credits roll
- 12 inch Vinyl
1. "Seasons" (Jonathan Peters Radio mix) – 3:55
2. "Seasons" (B-Z Blue Sunbeam remix) – 6:19
3. "Seasons" – 4:21
- Digital download
1. "Seasons" – 4:21
2. "Seasons" (Acoustic Orchestral remix) – 3:36
3. "To Be" (Acoustic Orchestral remix) – 5:25
4. "Seasons" (So Happy So Sad remix) – 6:58
5. "Seasons" (Jonathan Peters Radio mix) – 3:55
6. "Seasons" (Ray of Light remix) – 6:35
7. "Seasons" (Neutralized: Final Attack remix) – 4:45
8. "Seasons" (B-Z Blue Sunbeam remix) – 6:19
9. "Seasons" (Dub's Rain of Duv remix) – 4:35
10. "Seasons" (Instrumental) – 4:21
11. "Ever Free" (HAL's Mix 2000) – 4:18

== Charts ==
=== Weekly charts ===
Chart (2000)	Peak position
Japan Singles Chart (Oricon)	1
Japan Count Down TV Singles Chart (TBS)	1

=== Monthly charts ===
Chart (2000)	Peak position
Japan Singles Chart (Oricon)	1

=== Year-end charts ===
Chart (2000)	Peak position
Japan Singles Chart (Oricon)	5
Japan Count Down TV Annual Chart (TBS)	7

Chart (2001)	Position
Taiwan (Hito Radio)	51

== Certifications ==
Region	Certification	Certified units/sales
Japan (RIAJ) Physical	3× Platinum	1,367,000
Japan (RIAJ) Downloads	Platinum	250,000^{*}
Streaming
Japan (RIAJ)	Platinum	100,000,000^{†}
^{*} Sales figures based on certification alone.^{†} Streaming-only figures based on certification alone.

== Release history ==
Region	Date	Format	Label
Japan	June 7, 2000	CD single; DVD single; VHS	Avex Trax; Avex Taiwan
Japan	2008 (Note: There is currently insufficient evidence to determine what date Hamasaki's digital releases appeared on online retails. The closest source for iTunes Store evidence is at Jame World, whom confirmed Hamasaki's work was released worldwide on iTunes in September 2008.)	Digital download	Avex Entertainment Inc.
United States	2008	Digital download	Avex Entertainment Inc.
Australia	2008	Digital download	Avex Entertainment Inc.
New Zealand	2008	Digital download	Avex Entertainment Inc.
Canada	2008	Digital download	Avex Entertainment Inc.
United Kingdom	2008	Digital download	Avex Entertainment Inc.
Germany	2008	Digital download	Avex Entertainment Inc.
Ireland	2008	Digital download	Avex Entertainment Inc.
France	2008	Digital download	Avex Entertainment Inc.
Spain	2008	Digital download	Avex Entertainment Inc.
Taiwan	2008	Digital download	Avex Entertainment Inc.
