= Nonfiction (song) =

2022 single by Ayumi Hamasaki

Single by Ayumi Hamasaki

from the album Remember You
- Released: April 22, 2022
- Recorded: 2022
- Genre: J-pop; dance
- Length: 3:48
- Label: Avex Trax
- Songwriters: Ayumi Hamasaki (lyrics); Hisashi Koyama (music)

Ayumi Hamasaki singles chronology
"23rd Monster" (2021)	"Nonfiction" (2022)	"Summer Again" (2022)

Music video
- "Nonfiction" on YouTube

"Nonfiction" is a song by Japanese singer-songwriter Ayumi Hamasaki. It was released as a digital single only on April 22, 2022, to celebrate the singer's 24th anniversary of her debut on April 8, 1998.

The song debuted at number 1 on the Oricon Daily Digital Singles Chart upon release, and peaked at number 12 on the Oricon Weekly Digital Singles Chart.

== Background ==
On April 6, 2022, it was announced that a new song called "Nonfiction" would be released as a digital single on April 22, 2022, following a surprise performance of the song during Hamasaki's 24th anniversary concert, which took place that same day. Upon the announcement, the song was described to be "a dance tune with powerful lyrics" to commemorate the artist's 24th anniversary in the music industry.

== Writing and production ==
The song's lyrics were written by Hamasaki while the composition was handled by Hisashi Koyama. This marks their first time working together. Meanwhile, the arrangement was handled by long-time collaborator Tasuku.

== Release ==
The song was released on digital platforms and streaming services at midnight on April 22, 2022.

== Music video ==
The music video for the song was released on April 22, 2022 – the same day as the single's release date. The video features two sets; one that is entirely in pink and one that shows Hamasaki in a presidential hotel suite. The singer herself described the video as "a super-luxury masterpiece rarely seen in recent years" on her Instagram.

== Commercial performance ==
The song debuted at number one on the Oricon Daily Digital Single Chart with 2,596 copies sold. It dropped to number ten the following day, before placing at number 18 on the third day since its release. With three days worth of sales due to its being released in the middle of the charting week, it entered the Oricon Weekly Digital Singles Chart at number 12, having sold 3,665 downloads.

"Nonfiction" also debuted at number 12 on the Billboard Japan Top Download Songs chart. In its second week, the song placed at number 79.

== Track listing ==
=== Digital download ===
No.	Title	Length
1.	"Nonfiction"	3:48

== Charts ==
Chart (2022)	Peak position
Oricon Daily Digital Singles Chart	1
Oricon Weekly Digital Singles Chart	12
Billboard Japan Top Download	12
