= Duty (album) =

Studio album by Ayumi Hamasaki
- Released: September 27, 2000
- Recorded: 2000
- Studio: Prime Sound Studio (Tokyo); Nowadays Studio; Studio Sound Dali (Tokyo); On Air Azabu; Avex Studio
- Genre: J-pop; rock
- Length: 51:45
- Label: Avex Trax
- Producer: Max Matsuura

Ayumi Hamasaki chronology
Loveppears (1999)	Duty (2000)	A Best (2001)

Singles from Duty
- 1. "Vogue" Released: April 26, 2000; 2. "Far Away" Released: May 17, 2000; 3. "Seasons" Released: June 7, 2000; 4. "Surreal" Released: September 27, 2000; 5. "Audience" Released: November 1, 2000

Duty is the third studio album by Japanese recording artist Ayumi Hamasaki. It was released on September 27, 2000, by Avex Trax. Duty is Hamasaki's first studio album inside the 2000s decade, and her third consecutive studio album to be fully produced by Japanese musician and businessman Max Matsuura. The album's composing and arrangement was handled by several music collaborators, such as Ken Harada, Kazuhito Kikuchi, Dai Nagao, HΛL, among many others. Hamasaki contributed to the album as the primary and background vocalist, and songwriter to every song. Three different formats were released to promote the album: a standalone CD, a limited edition Playbutton, and a digital download.

Duty is noted for its darker and more introspective sound compared to Hamasaki’s earlier albums, blending JPop with pop rock, trip hop, and electronic influences. The record incorporates heavier band arrangements alongside programmed elements, producing what critics described as a melancholic and somber atmosphere. Lyrically, the album explores themes of despair, alienation, and responsibility, contrasted with moments of renewal and acceptance.

Upon the album's release, it was met with favorable reviews from music critics. Critics highlight individual songs as stand out tracks, and found the album a memorable effort within the Japanese pop genre. Duty became a massive commercial success upon release. It reached the top spot on Japan's Oricon Albums Chart with first week sales of over 1.6 million units. The album has sold over three million units in Japan since its release, making it her best-selling original studio album as well as the sixth highest-selling Japanese album of the aughts.

Five singles were released from the album. Two of the singles, "Seasons" and "Surreal", topped Japan's Oricon Singles Chart, while the former sold over 1.3 million units in Japan. Hamasaki promoted the album through her 2000 self-titled concert tour. "Duty" currently ranks as the 23rd highest-selling Japanese album of all time.

== Background and development ==
“The tour had a huge impact, and I think it’s strongly reflected in the album. But it’s not just that I made the album from what I gained after the tour. Before the tour, there was the trilogy of singles ('Vogue,' 'Far Away,' 'Seasons'), and that was one version of me. Then there was the me who was fighting through the tour. And now there’s the me who finished the tour and is enjoying life. I wanted to include that whole flow.”

—Hamasaki on the album's recording process.

Duty is Hamasaki's first studio album inside the 2000 decade, and her third consecutive studio album to be fully produced by Japanese musician and businessman Max Matsuura. For the album, Hamasaki's record label Avex Trax hired several Japanese musicians, Ken Harada, Kazuhito Kikuchi, Dai Nagao, HΛL, among many others to work on the album. Those producers are just some of whom worked with Hamasaki on her second studio album, the predecessor Loveppears (1999).

Duty was originally supposed to be released in the spring of 2000. Hamasaki explained in interviews that the album was shaped significantly by her nationwide concert tour earlier that year. She noted that the extensive live performances encouraged her to move away from the heavy reliance on electronic programming found in her earlier releases, and instead incorporate more band‑oriented arrangements. Recording for Duty began immediately after the tour concluded on August 9, 2000, with song selection and production carried out under a compressed schedule to meet the album’s release date of September 27, 2000. Hamasaki described the project as a reflection of her emotional state during this period, citing feelings of despair prior to the tour, a sense of release once it ended, and a renewed optimism that carried into the album’s completion.

Three songs on the album; the trilogy set "Vogue", "Far Away", and "Seasons", focus on the theme of hopelessness, a reflection of Hamasaki's disappointment that she had not expressed herself thoroughly in any of her previous lyrics and a sense of shame of her public image. Likewise, many of the songs she wrote for the album involved feelings of loneliness, chaos, confusion, and the burden of her responsibilities. She described her feelings after the song writing was done as "unnatural" and was constantly "nervous" for the finished result.

== Composition ==
The album is a J-pop and rock album with numerous musical elements of Latin pop and dance. According to Takako Tsuriya from Cawaii magazine, much of the musical style was "darker" than Loveppears. Likewise, the magazine labelled it a "rock"-influenced album with only one dance song, "Audience." "Audience" is also Hamasaki's second self-written song to incorporate an English word.

The album opens with the house-influenced "Starting Over", which is an instrumental track. "Duty" is a medium tempo and melancholic tune, with an intro sampling what sounds like a Gregorian chants. "Vogue" was influenced by the musical element of Latin pop. "End of the World" is a medium-tempo rock tune. "Scar" is a medium-tempo tune featuring a soft, skin-soft melody and a vocal that carefully weaves words.

“Far Away” is a melancholic JPop ballad that blends electronic and pop rock elements. "Surreal" is a rock song with alternative rock influences. "Audience" is a bouncy and "exciting" dance tune. "Seasons" is a slow tempo, orchestral power ballad. "Teddy Bear" is a medium-slow ballad has a retro feel, with an intro that transitions from noise sounds to a piano solo. "Key ~Eternal Tie Version~" is a ballad with a warm guitar riff and percussion sounds. "Girlish" is a song with a warm, real feel, with an intro that hints at the cheerful atmosphere before the performance, followed by laughter and handclaps.

== Release and packaging ==
"I felt strongly that I mustn’t miscommunicate the audience’s feelings. That’s why I chose Duty—what I’m meant to do. But it’s not about reaching out a hand to pull someone along. It’s more like: I’m walking with my hands in my pockets. If you want to come along, walk beside me. Not behind, not ahead—just next to me. And if you take action, I’ll fully support you. That’s the feeling I wanted to convey."

—Hamasaki explaining the title Duty.

Duty was released on September 27, 2000, by Avex Trax in three different formats. It was also released on the same day as her single "Surreal". The stand-alone CD featured the twelve tracks in a jewel case, with first press editions including an obi. A limited edition Playbutton, which is a headphone-insert device, featured the twelve tracks. The final format is the digital release, which was released in Japan at the time. In September 2008, the album, alongside several other albums and singles released by her, were released digitally on iTunes Store and Amazon.com.

The album artwork for Duty was photographed by Toru Kumazawa, and features Hamasaki in a leopard-print cat-suit. She is standing in between two elastic poles, similar to a cage or jail cell. The album cover featured “Leopard Ayu,” following earlier motifs of “White Ayu” and “Black Ayu” from Loveppears. Hamasaki explained that she chose the leopard motif simply because she wanted to, reflecting her growing comfort with actions that did not require a specific meaning. The art direction and designing was handled by Shinichi Hara and Shigeru Kasai from RICE, and leopard print was printed throughout the booklet. An out take of the album cover was used as the cover sleeve for the CD single and DVD/VHS release of "Surreal". Hamasaki explained that the title Duty was chosen to reflect her sense of responsibility to accurately convey the feelings of her audience. She described it not as leading or pulling fans along, but as walking beside them and supporting their actions when they chose to move forward.

== Critical response ==
Professional ratings
Review scores
Source	Rating
AllMusic	4.5/5 stars
MTVChinese.com	3/5 stars
CD Journal	(positive)

Duty received positive reviews from most music critics. Neil Z. Yeung from AllMusic gave the album a glowing review, stating that it was a "flawless" statement from start-to-finish. A staff reviewer from CD Journal was positive in their review. In comparison to Hamasaki's second album, Loveppears, the reviewer praised her application of "poetic" lyrics and clearer vocals. Su Weiquan from MTVChinese.com rated the album three out of five, stating that Hamasaki's control over the entire album was evident, and that she was becoming more and more mature. By the end of 2000, the album was nominated and won the Japan Record Award for the Best Album. At the Annual 2001 Japan Gold Disc Awards, Hamasaki won Domestic Artist of the Year, Duty was awarded Pop Album of the Year and the single "Seasons" was awarded Song of the Year.

In 2020, Jonathan McNamara of The Japan Times listed Duty as one of the 10 Japanese albums worthy of inclusion on Rolling Stone's 2020 list of the 500 greatest albums of all time, describing it as "an essential album for anyone seeking to comprehend the ever-evolving landscape of Japanese pop music."

== Commercial performance ==
In Japan, Duty debuted atop the Oricon Albums Chart with 1,682,760 units sold in its first week of availability, beating out Q by Mr. Children. This became Hamasaki's highest first week sales for an album, until it was surpassed by her 2001 greatest hits album A Best which shifted 2,874,870 units in its first week of sales. Duty stayed at number one for a second week, with 339,810 units sold in its second week of sales. It stayed at number one for a third week, with 205,180 units sold in its third week of sales. It stayed at number one for a fourth week, with 116,970 units sold in its fourth week of sales. The album slipped to number three in its fifth week, selling 94,640 units in its fifth week of sales.

The album fell outside the top 10 on December 4, 2000, the album's ninth week, selling 30,760 units. The album fell out the top 20 the following week, and sold 2.63 million units on December 4. By the time of Oricon's Annual album's list, Duty ranked at number two. The following year, it was ranked at number 77 with an additional 300,870 units sold. The album was certified triple million by the Recording Industry Association of Japan (RIAJ) for shipments of three million units in Japan. Duty charted for 27 weeks in total, and has sold over 2.9 million units in Japan and over 3.3 million units worldwide, making this Hamasaki's best-selling studio album both domestically and internationally. It is also the sixth best-selling album in Japan for the 2000s decade.

== Promotion ==
Several tracks from Duty were released on remixed compilations during 2000 and 2001. The first was her February 2001 non-stop remix album ayu-mi-x III Non-Stop Mega Mix Version. It peaked at number three and was certified platinum by RIAJ. The second album from the series was Ayu-mi-x III Acoustic Orchestra Version, an orchestral version of Duty. It reached four and was certified platinum by RIAJ. Two Eurobeat albums were released on 27 September 2001 to promote Duty: Super Eurobeat Presents Ayu-ro Mix 2 and Cyber Trance Presents Ayu Trance. They peaked at number one and three and were certified platinum by RIAJ, respectively.

To promote Duty, Hamasaki performed on several tours and concert shows; the first was her Ayumi Hamasaki Concert Tour 2000 Vol. 1. She promoted the album on her Ayumi Hamasaki Concert Tour 2000 Vol. 2, Ayumi Hamasaki Stadium Tour 2002 A and Ayumi Hamasaki Arena Tour 2003–2004 A, and her music videos for "Vogue", "Far Away", "Seasons", "Surreal" and other album promotional footage were featured on her 2004 video box set Ayumi Hamasaki Complete Clip Box A. Her dome tours in Japan attributed to her being one of few "top-drawer" Japanese artists to hold a concert at the Tokyo Dome.

=== Singles ===
"Vogue" was released as the album's lead single on April 24, 2000. The song is the first part of the Duty trilogy singles. It achieved success in Japan, peaking at number three on the Oricon Singles Chart and four on the TBS Count Down TV chart. It was certified double platinum by the Recording Industry Association of Japan (RIAJ) for shipments of 800,000 units. "Vogue" has sold over 767,000 units in Japan, as of today. The accompanying music video for "Vogue" was directed by Wataru Takeishi; it features two children in a post-apocalypse city, reading a book that has video imagery of Hamasaki in a cherry blossom field.

"Far Away" was released as the album's second single on May 17, 2000. The song is the second part of the Duty trilogy singles. Upon its release, the track garnered positive reviews from music critics, who praised Hamasaki's song writing and selected it as an album and career stand out track. It also achieved success in Japan, peaking at number two on the Oricon Singles Chart and on the TBS Count Down TV chart. The song was certified platinum by RIAJ for shipments of 400,000 units. "Far Away" has sold over 510,000 units in Japan, as of today. The accompanying music video for "Far Away" was directed by Takeishi, and leads on from the video of "Vogue"; it features two children in a post-apocalypse city, reading a book that has video imagery of Hamasaki in a cherry blossom field. Hamasaki then appears in the post-apocalypse city.

"Seasons was released as the album's third single on June 7, 2000. The song is the third and final part of the Duty trilogy singles. Upon its release, the track garnered positive reviews from music critics, who praised Hamasaki's song writing, the song's composition and selected it as an album and career stand out track. It also achieved success in Japan, peaking at number one on the Oricon Singles Chart and on the TBS Count Down TV chart. "Seasons" has sold over 1.367 million units in Japan, making this Hamasaki's best-selling single as of today. (Note: According to Hamasaki's profile on Oricon Style, her 1999 EP A is listed as her best-selling single; "Seasons" is listed at second. However, because the single includes four original tracks, with an additional eight remixes, it is generally deemed an extended play. As a result, "Seasons", which is a sole single track from the maxi CD, is Hamasaki's best-selling recognized single.) "Seasons" was certified million by RIAJ for shipments of one million units. In August 2014, the song was certified gold by RIAJ for digital sales of 100,000 units. The accompanying music video for "Seasons" was directed by Takeishi, and leads on from the videos of "Vogue" and "Far Away"; it features Hamasaki in a black gown in the middle of a post-apocalypse city.

"Surreal" was released as the album's fourth single on September 27, 2000. Upon its release, the song received positive reviews from most music critics. Majority of the critics commended the song writing and musical delivery, and highlighted it as an album and career stand out track. It also achieved success in Japan, peaking at number one on the Oricon Singles Chart and on the TBS Count Down TV chart. The song was certified platinum by RIAJ for shipments of 400,000 units. The song has sold over 417,000 units in Japan, as of today. The accompanying music video for "Surreal" was directed by Takeishi; it features Hamasaki wondering a beach and jungle, finding a cat-like clone of herself.

"Audience" was released as the album's fifth and final single on November 1, 2000. Upon its release, the song received positive reviews from most music critics. Majority of the critics highlighted it as an album and career stand out track. It also achieved success in Japan, peaking at number two on the Oricon Singles Chart and three on the TBS Count Down TV chart. The song was certified gold by RIAJ for shipments of 200,000 units. The song has sold over 293,000 units in Japan, as of today.

=== Other charted releases ===
The DVD single for the trilogy singles, released under the title of Vogue/Far Away/Seasons reached at number one on the Oricon DVD Chart, spending seventeen weeks in the top fifty. It is Hamasaki's second best-selling DVD single, and her eighth best-seller overall. Despite not charting in Japan, album track "Teddy Bear" was certified gold by RIAJ for digital sales of 100,000 units.

== Track listing ==
All lyrics are written by Ayumi Hamasaki.

Duty track listing
No.	Title	Music	Arranger(s)	Length
1.	"Starting Over" (instrumental)	Ken Harada	Ken Harada	1:36
2.	"Duty"	Ken Harada	Naoto Suzuki; Ken Harada	5:15
3.	"Vogue"	Kazuhito Kikuchi	Naoto Suzuki; Kazuhito Kikuchi	4:27
4.	"End of the World"	Yasuhiko Hoshino	Naoto Suzuki	4:40
5.	"Scar"	Kunio Tago	Naoto Suzuki	4:17
6.	"Far Away"	Kazuhito Kikuchi, D.A.I	HΛL	5:34
7.	"Surreal"	Kazuhito Kikuchi	HΛL	4:42
8.	"Audience"	D.A.I	HΛL	4:06
9.	"Seasons"	D.A.I	Naoto Suzuki	4:26
10.	"Teddy Bear"	D.A.I	Shingo Kobayashi	4:18
11.	"Key ~Eternal Tie Version~"	Kunio Tago	Naoto Suzuki	3:21
12.	"Girlish"	Yasuhiko Hoshino	Shingo Kobayashi	4:58

== Charts ==
=== Weekly charts ===
Chart (2000–2001)	Peak position
Japanese Albums (Oricon)	1

=== Year-end charts ===
Chart (2000)	Position
Japanese Albums (Oricon)	2

1993 year-end charts for The Swinging Star
Chart (2001)	Position
Japanese Albums (Oricon)	77

=== Decade-end charts ===
Chart (2000–2009)	Position
Japanese Albums (Oricon)	6

=== All-time chart ===
Chart	Position
Japanese Albums (Oricon)	23

== Certifications and sales ==
Region	Certification	Certified units/sales
Japan (RIAJ)	3× Million	2,904,420

== Release history ==
Region	Date	Format	Catalogue number
Japan	September 27, 2000	CD	AVCD-11837
Taiwan	September 27, 2000	CD	AVJCD-10061
Hong Kong	October 2000	CD	AVTCD-95387
China	2000	CD	AVTCD-95387/B: SCD-780

== Notes ==
Preceded by First Love (Hikaru Utada)	Japan Record Award for the Best Album; 2000	Succeeded by Love Notes (Gospellers)
