= Summer Again =

2022 single by Ayumi Hamasaki

Single by Ayumi Hamasaki

from the album Remember You
- Released: July 1, 2022
- Recorded: 2022
- Genre: J-pop; House
- Length: 4:00
- Label: Avex Trax
- Songwriters: Ayumi Hamasaki (lyrics); Hajime Kato (music)

Ayumi Hamasaki singles chronology
"Nonfiction" (2022)	"Summer Again" (2022)	"Mask" (2022)

Music video
- "Summer Again" on YouTube

"Summer Again" is a song by Japanese singer-songwriter Ayumi Hamasaki. It is the sixth single from her studio album Remember you (2023), released on digital platforms on July 1, 2022.

The song placed at number 2 on the Oricon Daily Digital Singles Chart upon release, and debuted at number 18 on the Oricon Weekly Digital Singles Chart.

== Background ==
After confirming work on a new studio album in April 2022, Hamasaki stated in a fanclub blog that she wanted to focus on making "summer music". This gained immediate interest from the public, Hamasaki having previously earned the nickname 'Queen of Summer' for mega hits such as "Blue Bird" and "July 1st". These past tracks are characterized by a "sense of transience", critics praising Hamasaki for her memorable storytelling; RealSound in particular empathizes her unique perspective, the general public gravitating towards "the kind of sadness only she can write about".

== Writing and production ==
"Summer Again" reflects on two years of COVID-19 pandemic measures, expressing a yearning for the summers lost and the freedom to be gained. In those years, Hamasaki had shifted the majority of her activities to streaming-only formats, and had commented on how it impacted human connection and mental health. As Japan slowly eased restrictions for public events, the singer organized a fanclub-only tour titled Summer TA Party 2022, announcing it on the same day as "Summer Again" was made available. The tour was held for seven dates across July and August 2022.

The song is described as a dance-pop number, Hamasaki's initially breathy vocals set over a strong house beat. The song evolves into an energetically upbeat chorus, the singer calling out to listeners that the summer they're about to take back is "just getting started", eventually swerving in to a bid to make up for lost time: "Again and again, there's no time to waste/As if you're falling in love with love again".

The track marks Hamasaki's first time working with composer Hajime Kato—previously known for working with Oldcodex, Nana Mizuki, and Iris—who would work with her again for the 2023 song "(Not) Remember You". The arrangement was handled by long-time collaborator Tasuku.

== Release ==
The song was released on digital platforms and streaming services at midnight on July 1, 2022.

== Music video ==
The music video for the song was released on July 2, 2022. The video was filmed on Ishigaki Island, and features Hamasaki emerging from the sea wearing a horned helmet before the footage switches between a local limestone cave and a bright beach setting. The singer joins her stage troupe for intermittent dance breaks, including a homage to the 2004 single "Inspire", and ends with shots showing them leaving the ocean together. RealSound described the music video as "stunning", complimenting Hamasaki's gold outfit and catchy choreography, while Billboard Japan focused on the "impactful" opening scene of Hamasaki alone in the sea.

== Commercial performance ==
The song debuted at number two on the Oricon Daily Digital Single Chart with 1,983 copies sold. With three days' worth of sales due to its being released in the middle of the charting week, it entered the Oricon Weekly Digital Singles Chart at number 18 with 2,954 downloads.

Additionally, "Summer Again" debuted at number 20 on the Billboard Japan Top Download Songs chart.

== Track listing ==
=== Digital download ===
No.	Title	Length
1.	"Summer Again"	4:00

== Charts ==
Chart (2022)	Peak position
Oricon Daily Digital Singles Chart	2
Oricon Weekly Digital Singles Chart	18
Billboard Japan Top Download	20
