= Power of Music 2011 A =

Ayumi Hamasaki Power of Music 2011 A

Video by Ayumi Hamasaki
- Released: March 21, 2012
- Genre: J-pop
- Label: Avex

Ayumi Hamasaki chronology
| Ayumi Hamasaki Countdown Live 2010–2011 A: Do It Again (2011) | Ayumi Hamasaki Power of Music 2011 A (2012) | Ayumi Hamasaki Countdown Live 2011–2012 A: Hotel Love Songs (2012) |

Ayumi Hamasaki Power of Music 2011 A is Japanese pop singer Ayumi Hamasaki's 13th Tour. Tour started on May 7, 2011, at Hiroshima Green Arena, continued as 'FINAL Chapter' started on September 30, 2011, at Osaka Castle Hall and ending as "Limited Edition" on October 18 and 19, 2011 at Saitama Super Arena. DVD released on March 21, 2012.

== Track listing ==
From Oricon

1. snowfield
2. forgiveness
3. progress
4. M
5. decision
6. Catcher in the Light
7. walking proud
8. part of Me
9. beloved
10. BRILLANTE
11. overture
12. Days
13. ANother song feat. URATA NAOYA
14. Why... feat. JUNO
15. vogue ~ Far away ~ SEASONS
16. WONDERLAND
17. Bold & Delicious
18. Mirrorcle World
19. evolution
20. Boys & Girls
21. Born to Be...
22. A Song Is born
23. Thank U
24. Making Movie

== Total reported sales ==
21,365

== Oricon chart positions ==
1st week = #6
