= 23rd Monster =

2021 single by Ayumi Hamasaki

Single by Ayumi Hamasaki

from the album Remember You
- Released: April 8, 2021
- Recorded: 2021
- Genre: J-pop; rock
- Length: 3:46
- Label: Avex Trax
- Songwriters: Ayumi Hamasaki (lyrics); Kazuhiro Hara (music)

Ayumi Hamasaki singles chronology
"Haru yo, Koi" (2021)	"23rd Monster" (2021)	"Nonfiction" (2022)

Music video
- "23rd Monster" on YouTube

"23rd Monster" is a song by Japanese singer-songwriter Ayumi Hamasaki. It is the fourth single from her studio album Remember you (2023). Hamasaki wrote the song alongside composer Kazuhiro Hara; previous collaborations between the two include "Step you", "Sparkle", and "We Are the Queens".

The song peaked at number two on the Oricon Daily Digital Singles Chart upon release, and ranked at number twenty-nine on the Oricon Weekly Digital Singles Chart.

== Background ==
Hamasaki shared behind the scenes photos of a shoot with Kazuyoshi Shimomura in March 2021. This was later confirmed to be for the cover art of "23rd Monster". Shimomura has previously worked with Hamasaki on works including "Mirrorcle World", "Green", and "Lady Dynamite"; when Hamasaki shared the teaser shots of the upcoming work, online commentary complimented the "classic beauty" of the style, and the chosen composition.

On April 7, it was announced that a new song would be released the next day to commemorate the singer's 23rd anniversary. Initially planned as a surprise release, Hamasaki pushed forward the official announcement after issues with international timezones. "We were counting down until midnight," the singer wrote. "But the surprise leaked a few minutes ago."

== Writing and production ==
The track combines the use of electric guitar, percussion drums, and synthesizers, Hamasaki returning to a pop rock style as seen on previous Hara tracks.

Lyrically, the track explores Hamasaki's frustration at perceived complacency, concluding that she must take back control of her career: "Doing only what you have to, choosing surrender rather than fight/You're also a 'monster'". Critics consider the song a powerful anthem of individualism that encourages listeners to disregard public opinion and choose their own path.

Billboard Japan described the track as aggressive, particularly highlighting its strong message, and a Spice Eplus review complimented Hamasaki on her fierce style of vocals.

== Music video ==
A video titled "浜崎あゆみ / 23rd Monster (MV teaser -episode 0-)" was uploaded on Hamasaki's official YouTube channel on April 8, 2021. Timed at just over a minute, it included a 'mysterious countdown' as well as dancers performing aggressive choreography.

The full music video for the song was released on June 18, with Spice Eplus describing it as introducing the viewer to an "epic, provocative world", Hamasaki standing in ruins while belting the track among dancers dressed as monsters. Other critics considered the music video's styling to be outdated, wondering if Hamasaki's rock-inspired image would appeal to the general public.

Hamasaki later empathized a particular attention to detail in the music video's direction, challenging viewers to find and solve the puzzles it included.

== Promotion ==
The song was performed on the first night of FNS Laugh and Music Festival on August 28, 2021. It also received live performances at the singer's Music for Life: Return and Asia Tour: 24th Anniversary Special concerts.

== Commercial performance ==
The song debuted at number two on the Oricon Daily Digital Single Chart with 2,276 copies sold. With four day's worth of sales due to its being released in the middle of the charting week, it entered the Oricon Weekly Digital Singles Chart at number 29, having sold 3,236 downloads.

Additionally, "23rd Monster" debuted at 30 on the Billboard Japan Top Download Songs chart.

== Track listing ==
=== Digital download ===
No.	Title	Length
1.	"23rd Monster"	3:46

== Charts ==
Chart (2021)	Peak position
Oricon Daily Digital Singles Chart	2
Oricon Weekly Digital Singles Chart	29
Billboard Japan Top Download Songs	30
