= Vogue (Ayumi Hamasaki song) =

- CD and digital artwork.

Single by Ayumi Hamasaki

from the album Duty
- B-side: "Ever Free"
- Released: April 26, 2000
- Recorded: 2000; Avex Studios; (Tokyo)
- Genre: J-Pop; Latin pop
- Length: 4:28
- Label: Avex Trax; Avex Taiwan; Rhythm Republic
- Songwriter: Ayumi Hamasaki
- Producer: Max Matsuura

Ayumi Hamasaki singles chronology
| "Fly High" (2000) | "Vogue" (2000) | "Far Away" (2000) |

Official Short Music Video
- "Vogue" on YouTube

Trilogy
- "Vogue～Far Away～Seasons" on YouTube

"Vogue" (uncapitalized as "vogue") is a song recorded by Japanese recording artist Ayumi Hamasaki for her third studio album, Duty (2000). It was written by Hamasaki, while production was handled by Max Matsuura. It premiered on April 26, 2000, as the lead single from the album. Her third consecutive lead single to be produced by Matsuura, the song is part of a trilogy from Duty; the other two singles being "Far Away" and "Seasons".

Musically, "Vogue" was described as a Japanese pop song with musical elements of Latin pop. The lyrics discusses her presence in the music industry. Upon its release, the track garnered positive reviews from music critics, who praised the composition and Hamasaki's song writing. It also achieved success in Japan, peaking at number three on the Oricon Singles Chart and four on the TBS Count Down TV chart. "Vogue" has sold over 767,000 units in Japan.

The accompanying music video for "Vogue" was directed by Wataru Takeishi; it features two children in a post-apocalyptic city, reading a book that contains video imagery of Hamasaki in a cherry blossom field. Both the music video and the song has appeared on several compilations by Hamasaki, including A Best (2001) and A Complete: All Singles (2008). For additional promotion, the song was featured on several concert tours by Hamasaki including her 2000 self-titled and the Power of Music tour.

== Background and release ==
"Vogue" was written by Hamasaki, while production was handled by Japanese musician Max Matsuura. The song was composed and arranged by long-term collaborator Kazuhito Kikuchi, whilst Japanese musician Naoto Suzuki co-arranged it. This was Kikuchi's final collaboration with Hamasaki, until he returned as the main composer for her sixth studio album, My Story (2004). For the track's instrumentation, Suzuki played the keyboards, Naoki Hayashibe played the guitar, and Takahiro Iida mixed the final composition. It was selected as the lead single from Duty, and was released on April 26, 2000, by Avex Trax.

The maxi CD of the single contains the original composition and its instrumental version, plus seven remixes and the b-side "Ever Free". "Vogue" is her first single to include an unreleased non-album b-side since her 1999 single "Depend on You", and remains her final to do so. As a single from the Duty trilogy, which included Hamasaki's singles "Far Away" and "Seasons", the singles were released as a DVD single and VHS. It included the three mini-music videos, alongside the making of the videos and a TV commercial. The CD and digital cover sleeve has a close-up of Ayumi Hamasaki's face, edited with digital effects. The song's title, "Vogue", is present on cover. According to Matt Wilce from Metropolis magazine, the song's title was influenced by the same titular song by American recording artist Madonna. The standalone CD cover was used as the digital EP cover for the iTunes Store and Amazon.com.

== Composition ==
"Vogue" was recorded in 2000 at Avex Studios and Prime Sound Studios in Tokyo, Japan. The song was described as a Japanese pop song with musical elements of Latin pop. As part of the trilogy set with "Far Away" and "Seasons", "Vogue" highlights the theme of the present. With this, "Far Away" details the past and "Seasons" discusses Hamasaki's future. The trilogy set also focuses on hopelessness, a reflection of Hamasaki's disappointment that she had not expressed herself thoroughly in any of her previous songs. Based on her song writing, she described her feelings after the writing all the tracks from Duty as "unnatural" and was constantly "nervous" for the final result. A staff reviewer from Amazon Japan noticed the trilogy set had a "healing effect" that was absent on Hamasaki's two previous studio albums.

== Critical response ==
"Vogue" received highly favourable reviews from music critics. Alexey Eremenko, who had written her extended biography at AllMusic, highlighted the song as an album and career stand out track. A staff reviewer from Yahoo! GeoCities reviewed Hamasaki's greatest hits album A Best, and singled out the song as one of her best tracks. They commented that "Vogue" was the best examples of "classic J-pop music." Morimosa from Nifty.com complimented Hamasaki's song writing; he compared the song writing to the rest of the songs from Duty, and commended how she inducted a "pessimistic" nature rather than "anxiety" or "aggression". Hamasaki hosted an online voting poll for fans to choose their favourite tracks to be featured on her Ayumi Hamasaki 15th Anniversary Tour. As a result, "Vogue" was included on the list. The song was remixed as an orchestral song for her remix album ayu-mi-x III Acoustic Orchestra Version (2003), and was commended alongside other tracks for its "rich melody".

== Commercial performance ==
In Japan, "Vogue" debuted at number three on the Oricon Singles Chart. It lasted for seventeen weeks on the chart, selling 767,660 units by the end of 2000. This became Hamasaki's third highest selling single at the time. Currently, the song is Hamasaki's eighth best selling single, according to Oricon Style. The DVD single, released under the title of Vogue/Far Away/Seasons reached at number one on the Oricon DVD Chart, spending seventeen weeks in the top fifty. It is Hamasaki's second best selling DVD single, and her eighth best seller overall. "Vogue" was certified double platinum by the Recording Industry Association of Japan (RIAJ) for shipments of 800,000 units. The single entered at number four on Japan's TBS Count Down TV Chart; it stayed there for two consecutive weeks, and lasted seventeen weeks in the chart. "Vogue" was placed at number twenty-five on their Annual Count Down TV chart in 2000.

== Music video ==
The accompanying music video was directed by Wataru Takeishi. Because the music video was part of the trilogy set with "Far Away" and "Seasons", only a portion of the song was shot for the video. As a result, the video for "Vogue" lasts for two minutes and fifty-one seconds. The artwork for the single was a screen shoot from the music video. Two out take shots from the video were then used for the artworks for "Far Away" and "Seasons". The music video was included on the DVD and VHS formats of the three singles. The music video also appeared on Hamasaki's DVD compilation box sets: A Clips Vol.2 (2002), Complete Clip Box (2004), A Clip Box 1998–2011 (2011), and the bonus DVD version with A Complete: All Singles.

=== Synopsis ===
Hamasaki (above) is singing inside of a photo album that the two children found in an industrial post-apocalyptic world (below).

The video opens with two children walking through a post-apocalyptic world, with industrial sites in the background. The two children are barred in with barded wire fences. Hamasaki then appears inside a photo album, singing the song in front of cherry blossom trees. Hamasaki's scenes are inter cuts that are featured throughout the entire video. The two children escape by crawling under the fence, but are being watched by camera surveillance.

They are free and start to run around a hilly surface, only to see more industrial sites blowing out fumes in the distance. The two children find an unusual object buried in the sands surface and dig it up. They find an electronic-powered crate, open it, and find a blank photo album. The photo album starts to show the cherry trees from where Hamasaki is singing from, and finally watch Hamasaki singing. The last chorus features Hamasaki singing, fully colored, with the children flipping each page to observe the flowers where Hamasaki is singing from. The final scene features a destructed Empire State Building in the distance, with Hamasaki in the middle of the land by herself; this scene then leads onto the music video for "Far Away".

== Live performances and other appearances ==
Hamasaki has performed "Vogue" on several concert tours and New Years countdown shows throughout Asia. It has been included in all of Hamasaki's New Years countdown concerts up until the Ayumi Hamasaki Countdown Live 2006–2007 A. (Note: All New Years concert links are listed below; 2000–2001 A, 2006-2007, and 2008-2009.) The song made its debut tour performance on Hamasaki's 2000 Japan Concert Tour. It appeared on her 2002 Stadium Tour and The Power of Music Tour. The song's last live performance was her 2014 Ayumi Hamasaki Premium Showcase: Feel the love, in which was supported by her 2014 studio album Colours. (Note: All arena tours appearances are listed below; Stadium Tour 2002, and the final performance from Premium Showcase: Feel the Love.) The song has been included on two of her greatest hits compilations, which are A Best (2002), and A Complete: All Singles (2008),

"Vogue" was remixed by several professional disc jockeys and producers, and has appeared on several remix albums by Hamasaki. The remixes include the Computerhell and Junkie XL remix on ayu-mi-x III Non-Stop Mega Mix Version (2001) and Ayu-mi-x 4 + Selection Non-Stop Mega Mix Version (2002), the Dave Rodgers remix on Super Eurobeat Presents Ayu-ro Mix 2 (2001), the Traditional remix on Rmx Works from Super Eurobeat Presents Ayu-ro Mix 3 (2003), and the Groove Coverage remix on Ayu-mi-x 7 Presents Ayu Trance 4 (2011). The orchestral acoustic remix, and its instrumental version, was included on her third orchestral remix album, ayu-mi-x III Acoustic Orchestra Version (2001). It was used as the theme song for Japanese cosmetics brand Kose Visee, and the b-side track "Ever Free" was used as the theme song for the 2000 Japanese TV series Tenki Yohou no Koibito.

== Track listings ==
- Japanese CD single
1. "Vogue" – 4:29
2. "Vogue" (Hal's 2000 remix) – 4:42
3. "Too Late" (Soul Solution extended remix) – 7:25
4. "Vogue" (Dub's Mellowtech remix) – 6:51
5. "Vogue" (Groove That Soul remix) – 5:43
6. "Vogue" (400Bpm Fatback remix) – 5:18
7. "Whatever" (FPM's Winter Bossa remix) – 6:53
8. "Vogue" (Pandart Sasanooha mix) – 5:25
9. "Vogue" (instrumental) – 4:29
10. "Ever Free" – 3:51
- Vogue/Far Away/Seasons DVD single
1. "Vogue" (music video)
2. "Far Away" (music video)
3. "Seasons" (music video)
4. TV commercial for DVD single
5. "Vogue" (making of the music video)
6. "Far Away" (making of the music video)
7. "Seasons" (making of the music video)
8. Credits roll
- 12 inch Vinyl
1. "Vogue" (Dub's Mellowtech remix) – 6:51
2. "Vogue" (Groove That Soul remix) – 5:43
3. "Vogue" – 4:29
- Digital download
1. "Vogue" – 4:29
2. "Vogue" (Hal's 2000 remix) – 4:42
3. "Too Late" (Soul Solution extended remix) – 7:25
4. "Vogue" (Dub's Mellowtech remix) – 6:51
5. "Vogue" (Groove That Soul remix) – 5:43
6. "Vogue" (400Bpm Fatback remix) – 5:18
7. "Whatever" (FPM's Winter Bossa remix) – 6:53
8. "Vogue" (Pandart Sasanooha mix) – 5:25
9. "Ever Free" – 3:51

== Credits and personnel ==
Credits adapted from the singles liner notes:

- Ayumi Hamasaki – songwriting, vocals, background vocals
- Naoto Suzuki – arrangement
- Kazuhito Kikuchi – composition, arrangement
- Max Matsuura – executive producer, vocal production, additional production
- Shinichi Hara – art direction
- Shigeru Kasai – design
- Toru Kumazawa – photographer
- Koji Matsumoto – fashion director
- Koji Matsumoto and Takako Mishima – stylist
- CHIKA – hair assistant and make-up stylist
- Kanako Miura – nail artist

== Charts and certifications ==
=== Weekly and daily charts ===
| Chart (2000) | Peak position |
|---|---|
| Japan Daily Singles Chart (Oricon) | 2 |
| Japan Weekly Singles Chart (Oricon) | 3 |
| Japan Count Down TV Singles Chart (TBS) | 4 |
| Japan Count Down TV Annual Chart (TBS) | 25 |

=== Certification ===
| Region | Certification | Certified units/sales |
|---|---|---|
| Japan (RIAJ) | 2× Platinum | 767,660 |

== Release history ==
| Region | Date | Format | Label |
|---|---|---|---|
| Japan | April 26, 2000 | CD single; DVD single; VHS | Avex Trax; Avex Taiwan |
| Japan | 2008 (Note: There is currently insufficient evidence to determine what date Hamasaki's digital releases appeared on online retails. The closest source for iTunes Store evidence is at Jame World, whom confirmed Hamasaki's work was released worldwide on iTunes in September 2008.) | Digital download | Avex Entertainment Inc. |
| United States | 2008 | Digital download | Avex Entertainment Inc. |
| Australia | 2008 | Digital download | Avex Entertainment Inc. |
| New Zealand | 2008 | Digital download | Avex Entertainment Inc. |
| Canada | 2008 | Digital download | Avex Entertainment Inc. |
| United Kingdom | 2008 | Digital download | Avex Entertainment Inc. |
| Germany | 2008 | Digital download | Avex Entertainment Inc. |
| Ireland | 2008 | Digital download | Avex Entertainment Inc. |
| France | 2008 | Digital download | Avex Entertainment Inc. |
| Spain | 2008 | Digital download | Avex Entertainment Inc. |
| Taiwan | 2008 | Digital download | Avex Entertainment Inc. |
