= Far Away (Ayumi Hamasaki song) =

2000 song by Ayumi Hamasaki

- CD and digital artwork.

Single by Ayumi Hamasaki

from the album Duty
- Released: May 17, 2000
- Recorded: 2000
- Genre: J-pop
- Length: 5:35
- Label: Avex Trax
- Songwriter(s): Ayumi Hamasaki
- Producer(s): Max Matsuura

Ayumi Hamasaki singles chronology
"Vogue" (2000)	"Far Away" (2000)	"Seasons" (2000)

Official Music Video
- "Far Away" on YouTube

Trilogy
- "Vogue～Far Away～Seasons" on YouTube

"Far Away" (stylized as "Far away") is a song recorded by Japanese recording artist Ayumi Hamasaki for her third studio album, Duty (2000). It was written by Hamasaki, while production was handled by Max Matsuura. It premiered on May 17, 2000, as the second single from the album. The song is part of a trilogy from Duty; the other two singles being "Vogue" and "Seasons".

Upon its release, the track garnered positive reviews from music critics, who praised Hamasaki's song writing and selected it as an album and career stand out track. It also achieved success in Japan, peaking at number two on the Oricon Singles Chart and on the TBS Count Down TV chart. "Far Away" has sold over 510,000 units in Japan.

The accompanying music video for "Far Away" was directed by Wataru Takeishi, and serves as a sequel to the video for "Vogue"; it features two children in a post-apocalypse city, reading a book that has video imagery of Hamasaki in a cherry blossom field. Hamasaki then appears in the post-apocalypse city. Both the music video and the song has appeared on several compilations by Hamasaki, including A Best (2001) and A Complete: All Singles (2008). For additional promotion, the song was featured on several concert tours by Hamasaki including her 2000 Japan tour and her Power of Music tour.

== Background and release ==
"Far Away" was written by Hamasaki, while production was handled by Japanese producer Max Matsuura. The song was composed by long-term collaborators Kazuhito Kikuchi and Dai Nagao, whilst arrangement was handled by Japanese production team HΛL. This was one of Kikuchi's final collaborations with Hamasaki, until he returned as the main composer for her sixth studio album, My Story (2004). For the track's instrumentation, HΛL played the keyboard and mixed the final composition, Naoki Akimoto played the guitar, and Junko Hirotani provided background vocals. Atushi Hattori co-mixed the final composition alongside HΛL. It was selected as the second single from Duty, and was released on May 17, 2000, by Avex Trax.

The maxi CD of the single contains the original composition and its instrumental version, plus nine remixes. As a single from the Duty trilogy, which included Hamasaki's singles "Vogue" and "Seasons", the singles were released as DVD singles and on VHS; it included the three mini-music videos, alongside the making videos and a TV commercial. The CD and digital cover sleeve has a polaroid photo of Hamasaki in water. The standalone CD cover was used as the digital EP cover for the iTunes Store and Amazon.com.

== Composition ==
"Far Away" was recorded in 2000 at Avex Studios and Prime Sound Studios in Tokyo, Japan. As part of the trilogy set with "Vogue" and "Seasons", "Far Away" highlights theme of nostalgia, describing Hamasaki's past. Following the same theme, "Vogue" details the present and "Seasons" discusses Hamasaki's future. The trilogy set also focuses on hopelessness, a reflection of Hamasaki's disappointment that she had not expressed herself thoroughly on any of her previous lyrics. Based on her song writing, she described her feelings after the writing all the tracks from Duty as "unnatural" and was constantly "nervous" for the final result. A staff reviewer from Amazon Japan noticed that the trilogy set had a "healing effect" that was absent on Hamasaki's two previous studio albums.

== Critical response ==
"Far Away" received generally favourable reviews from music critics. Alexey Eremenko, who had written her extended biography at AllMusic, highlighted the song as an album and career stand out track. Morimosa from Nifty.com complimented Hamasaki's songwriting; he compared the song writing to the rest of the songs from Duty, and praised Hamasaki's ability to write about both "positive" and "negative" topics in the song. Hamasaki hosted an online voting poll for fans to choose their favourite tracks to be featured on her Ayumi Hamasaki 15th Anniversary Tour Best Live Tour. As a result, "Far Away" was included on the list. In early 2014, in honor of Hamasaki's sixteenth-year career milestone, Japanese website Goo.ne.jp hosted a poll for fans to rank their favourite songs by Hamasaki out of thirty positions; the poll was held in only twenty-four hours, and thousands submitted their votes; as a result, "Far Away" was ranked at 22, with 19.9 percent of the votes.

== Commercial performance ==
In Japan, "Far Away" debuted at number two on the Oricon Singles Chart; it lasted for 13 weeks on the chart, selling 510,460 units by the end of 2000. This became Hamasaki's fifth highest selling single at the time; the song is currently Hamasaki's 15th best selling single according to Oricon Style. The DVD single, released under the title of Vogue/Far Away/Seasons reached at number one on the Oricon DVD Chart, spending seventeen weeks in the top fifty. It is Hamasaki's second best selling DVD single, and her eighth best seller overall. "Far Away" was certified platinum by the Recording Industry Association of Japan (RIAJ) for shipments of 400,000 units. The single entered at number two on Japan's TBS Count Down TV Chart; it stayed there for one week, and lasted 14 weeks in the chart. It was placed at number 51 on their Annual Count Down TV chart in 2000.

== Music video ==
The accompanying music video was directed by Wataru Takeishi. Because the music video was part of the trilogy set with "Vogue" and "Seasons", only a portion of the song was shot for the video. As a result, the video for "Far Away" lasts for two minutes and 21 seconds. Two outtake shots from the "Vogue" video were then used for the artworks of "Far Away" and "Seasons". The music video was included on the DVD and VHS formats of "Far Away". The music video also appeared on Hamasaki's DVD compilation box sets: A Clips Vol.2 (2002), Complete Clip Box (2004), A Clip Box 1998–2011 (2011), and the bonus DVD version with A Complete: All Singles.

=== Synopsis ===
The video opens with a close-up shot of Hamasaki, similar to the one in "Vogue". Two children are seen in the distance, both of whom were in the "Vogue" music video". Hamasaki holds up a fishbowl with a goldfish inside, where it is then digitally edited with textile layers and gradients. As Hamasaki continues singing the song, she is then standing in the middle of the post-apocalyptic world from "Vogue". Both the children look into the distance, with inter cut scenes of Hamasaki singing and different fish swimming in the fish bowl. As the children look into the distance, a storm starts in the sky. The kids drop the picture book in the "Vogue" video, and run of into the distance. The final scene has Hamasaki singing on the front cover of the book.

== Live performances and other appearances ==
Hamasaki has performed "Far Away" on several concert tours throughout Asia. The song was performed on both of Hamasaki's 2000 concerts in Japan, where it was included during the first segment. It was included on two live DVD's (Vol.1 and Vol.2) released on September 27, 2000. The song was performed on her 2011 Power of Music tour in Japan, where it was included in the trilogy segment with "Vogue" and "Seasons". It was included on the live DVD, released on March 21, 2012. The song has been included on three of her greatest hits compilations; A Best (2002), A Complete: All Singles (2008), and A Summer Best (2012). The 2000 vol. 1 live performance was included on Hamasaki's live DVD compilation, A 50 Singles: Live Selection (2011), and the DVD edition of A Summer Best.

"Far Away" has been remixed by several professional disc jockeys and producers, and has appeared on several remix albums by Hamasaki, including the Hex Hector and Rank remix on ayu-mi-x III Non-Stop Mega Mix Version (2001) and Ayu-mi-x 4 + Selection Non-Stop Mega Mix Version (2002), the Ayu-Ro remix on Super Eurobeat Presents Ayu-ro Mix 2 (2001), and the Alex Morph remix on Ayu-mi-x 7 Presents Ayu Trance 4 (2011). The orchestral acoustic remix and its instrumental version, were included on her third orchestral remix album, ayu-mi-x III Acoustic Orchestra Version (2001).

== Track listing ==
- Japanese CD single
1. "Far Away" – 5:35
2. "Far Away" (Crafty Remix) – 5:18
3. "Far Away" (Main Radio Mix) – 4:45
4. "Appears" (Junior's Club Mix) – 9:42
5. "Far Away" (HΛL'S Mix 2000) – 4:36
6. "Far Away" (Ocean View Remix) – 5:31
7. "End Roll" (Da Urban Maesto Mix) – 6:06
8. "Far Away" (Huge Mutual-Tried Mix) – 3:18
9. "Far Away" (Pop 'e.a.' Mix II) – 4:51
10. "Far Away" (Dub's Mute & Feedback Remix) – 6:13
11. "Far Away" (Instrumental) – 5:18
- Vogue/Far Away/Seasons DVD single
1. "Vogue" (music video)
2. "Far Away" (music video)
3. "Seasons" (music video)
4. TV commercial for DVD single
5. "Vogue" (making of the music video)
6. "Far Away" (making of the music video)
7. "Seasons" (making of the music video)
8. Credits roll
- 12 inch Vinyl
1. "Far Away" (Main Vox Mix)
2. "Far Away" (Crafty Remix) – 5:18
3. "Far Away" – 5:35
- Digital download
1. "Far Away" – 5:35
2. "Far Away" (Crafty Remix) – 5:18
3. "Far Away" (Main Radio Mix) – 4:45
4. "Appears" (Junior's Club Mix) – 9:42
5. "Far Away" (HΛL'S Mix 2000) – 4:36
6. "Far Away" (Ocean View Remix) – 5:31
7. "End Roll" (Da Urban Maesto Mix) – 6:06
8. "Far Away" (Huge Mutual-Tried Mix) – 3:18
9. "Far Away" (Pop 'e.a.' Mix II) – 4:51
10. "Far Away" (Dub's Mute & Feedback Remix) – 6:13

== Credits and personnel ==
Credits adapted from the singles liner notes:

- Ayumi Hamasaki – song writing, vocals, background vocals
- Max Matsuura – producing
- Kazuhito Kikuchi – composing
- Dai "D.A.I." Nagao – composing
- HΛL – arranging, keyboards, programming, mixing
- Naoki Akimoto – guitar
- Junko Hirotani – background vocals
- Atsushi Hattori – mixing
- Shinichi Hara – art direction
- Shigeru Kasai – design
- Toru Kumazawa – photographer
- Koji Matsumoto – fashion director
- Koji Matsumoto and Takako Mishima – stylist
- CHIKA – hair assistant and make-up stylist
- Kanako Miura – nail artist
- Avex Trax – Hamasaki's record label

== Charts and certifications ==
=== Weekly and daily charts ===
Chart (2000)	Peak position
Japan Daily Singles Chart (Oricon)	2
Japan Weekly Singles Chart (Oricon)	2
Japan Count Down TV Singles Chart (TBS)	2
Japan Count Down TV Annual Chart (TBS)	51

=== Certification ===
Region	Certification	Certified units/sales
Japan (RIAJ)	Platinum	510,460

== Release history ==
Region	Date	Format	Label
Japan	May 17, 2000	CD single; DVD single; VHS	Avex Trax; Avex Taiwan
Japan	2008 (Note: There is currently insufficient evidence to determine what date Hamasaki's digital releases appeared on online retails. The closest source for iTunes Store evidence is at Jame World, whom confirmed Hamasaki's work was released worldwide on iTunes in September 2008.)	Digital download	Avex Entertainment Inc.
United States	2008	Digital download	Avex Entertainment Inc.
Australia	2008	Digital download	Avex Entertainment Inc.
New Zealand	2008	Digital download	Avex Entertainment Inc.
Canada	2008	Digital download	Avex Entertainment Inc.
United Kingdom	2008	Digital download	Avex Entertainment Inc.
Germany	2008	Digital download	Avex Entertainment Inc.
Ireland	2008	Digital download	Avex Entertainment Inc.
France	2008	Digital download	Avex Entertainment Inc.
Spain	2008	Digital download	Avex Entertainment Inc.
Taiwan	2008	Digital download	Avex Entertainment Inc.
