= Junko Hirotani =

Japanese singer (1956–2020)

Junko Hirotani 広谷 順子
- Born: 17 October 1956; Tokyo, Japan
- Died: 4 January 2020 (aged 63); Tama, Tokyo, Japan
- Genres: J-pop
- Occupation: Singer
- Instrument: Singing

Junko Kido (木戸 順子, Kido Junko, 17 October 1956 – 4 January 2020), better known by her birth name, Junko Hirotani (広谷 順子, Hirotani Junko), was a Japanese singer.

== Biography ==
Junko Hirotani was born in Tokyo on 17 October 1956. She won two awards at the Intercollege Original Song Contest as a university student.

She had a brief singing career, where she released three albums: two of them Sono ai ni (その愛に) and Blendy, were released for Canyon Records, and her third album ENOUGH was her only one with Polydor Records. Afterwards, she later worked as a back chorus singer and composer for several singers, including Akina Nakamori (particularly her song Mizu ni sashita hana), Arashi, Aya Hisakawa, Ayumi Hamasaki, Chemistry, Do As Infinity, Every Little Thing (band), Gackt, Izam, Joe Hisaishi, Junko Iwao, Kaho Shimada, Ken Matsudaira, Kikuko Inoue, Kyoko Fukada, Luna Sea, Mami Kingetsu, Mariko Kouda, Miho Nakayama, Miki Nakatani, Miu Sakamoto, Nana Katase, Noriko Sakai, Ryoko Moriyama, Ryuichi Kawamura, Seiko Matsuda, Shinji Tanimura, SMAP, Spitz, Sugizo, Takako Uehara, Takao Horiuchi, Takuro Yoshida, Tomoyo Harada, Vivian Hsu, Wink, Yoko Minamino, Yoshimi Iwasaki, Yui Asaka, and Yumi Matsutoya.

She sang both the opening and ending of the Clamp in Wonderland anime.

She married musician Yasuhiro Kido. They released an a cappella album Breath by Breath from Crown Records. Hirotani lived in Tama, Tokyo, where she died of breast cancer at the age of 63 on 4 January 2020. Her husband announced her death on Facebook the next day.
