= List of songs about Tokyo =

Tokyo, the capital and largest city in Japan, has had a large impact on worldwide pop culture. As such, hundreds of songs either mention it or are fully written about it.

== List ==
=== Songs with "Tokyo" or "Tokio" in the title ===
- "30 Seconds Over Tokyo" by Pere Ubu
- "A French Man In Tokyo" by Talamasca
- "A History Of Tokyo Rail Traction" by John Fahey (musician)
- "All The Way From Tokyo" by Elliott Murphy
- "Anarchy in Tokyo" by 30 Seconds to Mars
- "Attention Tokyo" by Human Audio Sponge
- "Awake In Neo Tokyo" by Freez-E-Style (techno)
- "Back In Tokio" by Yellow Magic Orchestra
- "Back To Tokyo" by Axelle
- "Black Tokyo" by Aux 88
- "Blue Tokyo" by Subaeris
- "Blues From Tokyo" by Creation (Japanese band)
- "Boogie Man Lives In Tokyo" by Ryojiro Furusawa & Lee Oskar
- "Boy King Of Tokyo" by Bill Lloyd
- "Breakfast In Tokyo" by Ratko Zjaca, John Patitucci, Steve Gadd, Stanislav Mitrovic, Randy Brecker
- "Downtown Tokyo" by Peter Parker's Rock N Roll Club
- "Cheap Cheap Cheaper (Tokyo Theme)" by The Monotones
- "Come In Tokyo" by Huevos Rancheros
- "Dateline: Tokyo" by Brock Walsh
- "Daybreak In Tokyo" by Ralph Stanley
- "Escape From Tokyo" by DJ Evolution
- "Evening On Tokyo's Sumida" by Norrie Paramor
- "Expo in Tokyo" by Alan Moorhouse
- "Fast Train To Tokyo" by Rita MacNeil
- "Five Bells Over Tokyo" by Peeni Waali
- "Flight To Tokyo" by Electronic System
- "Foreign Prince Of Tokyo" by Alan Merrill
- "From Rome To Tokyo" by Turning Point
- "From Tokyo To Frisco" by Maria Verano
- "From Tokyo To London" by East Meets West
- "Go Go Go Tokyo" by The Rubinoos
- "Gomen ne Tokyo" by Misaki Iwasa
- "Good Morning Tokyo!" by Tokyo's Revenge
- "Goodnight Tokyo" by Jackie O
- "Hammersmith To Tokyo And Back" by Art of Noise
- "(Heart of) Tokyo" by She One
- "'Here I Go To Tokio', Said Barnacle Bill, The Sailor" by Carson Robison
- "Hero In Tokyo" by Burn The Negative
- "Hongkong – Tokyo" by Hubert Kah
- "I was Born in Tokio" by Charles Lecocq, Gustave Kerker and Charles Alfred Byrne
- "JAL To Tokyo" by Underworld
- "Jet Stream Tokyo" by Humanoid Brian Dougans
- "Ke-Toky-I-O" by The Sportsmen (featuring Thurl Ravenscroft)
- "Keys In Tokyo" by Chris Silvertune featuring Anja
- "Left My Heart in Tokyo" by Mini Viva
- "Let's Go To Tokyo" by TQ
- "Life in Tokyo" by Gruppo Sportivo
- "Life in Tokyo" by Japan
- "Livin' Tokyo" by Faust
- "Lonely in Tokyo" by MIREI
- "Lost in Tokyo" by Super Girls
- "Love From Tokyo" by Rita Coolidge
- "Love In Tokyo" by The Honeycombs
- "Love You Tokyo" by Sam Taylor (saxophonist)
- "Loved In Tokyo" by Max Zero
- "Midnight In Tokyo" by Addy Flor
- "Midnight In Tokyo" by Cornerstone
- "Midnight In Tokyo" by Ian Mitchell (musician) Band
- "Midnight In Tokyo" by Joe Lynn Turner
- "Midnight In Tokyo" by Tokyo Boys
- "Midnight In Tokyo" by Y&T
- "Mon Amour Tokyo" by Pizzicato Five
- "My Private Tokyo" by Vicious Pink
- "Nanstans I Tokyo" by Hasse C
- "New Tokyo Blue Mood" by Subaeris
- "New York – Rio – Tokyo" by Trio Rio
- "Night In Tokyo" by Nahki, Tony & Chris (reggae)
- "Night Train To Tokyo" by Laurel Aitken
- "Nightflight To Tokyo" by Roger Bennet
- "Nightlife In Tokyo" by Harold Mabern Trio
- "No One Sleep in Tokyo" by Edo Boys
- "North Korean Blues (Oh Tokyo)" by Loudon Wainwright III
- "Ohayo Tokyo" by Alcatrazz
- "Ohio To Tokyo" by The Lilac Street Band
- "One Night In Tokyo" by Arthur Lyman
- "One Night In Tokyo" by Bad Moon Rising
- "One Night In Tokyo" by Beast in Black
- "One Rainy Night In Tokyo" by Brenda Lee
- "Ooglie, Ooglie, Oogie (The Tokyo Boogie)" by Moon Mullican
- "Paris, Tokyo" by Lupe Fiasco
- "Piscine A Tokyo" by Opera Multi Steel
- "Radio Tokyo" by Devin Payne
- "Radio Tokyo" by Marvelous 3
- "Radio Tokyo" by Yellow Power (Tony Carey)
- "Rainy Night In Tokyo" by Michael Franks
- "Rock And Roll In Tokyo" by G.I. Jap
- "Roof Tops Of Tokyo" by Billy Vaughn
- "Saturday Night In Tokyo" by Ian McDonald
- "Sayonara Tokyo" by Singing Melody
- "Secret Of Tokyo" by Kazumi Watanabe
- "Straight To Stereo (Tokyo-London)" by Dr Calculus (featured Stephen Duffy)
- "Street Angels, Tokyo" by Frank Chickens
- "Summer In Tokyo" by Azymuth
- "Sunrise in Tokyo" by Joe Henderson
- "Sunrise in Tokyo" by Tokyo Blade
- "Sunshine In Tokyo" by Tirez Tirez
- "Superstar In Tokyo" by Hot Cold
- "Take Me Back To Tokyo" by Mega NRG Man
- "Talk You All Tight(Dedicated To The City Of Tokyo)" by Kazumi Band (featuring Kazumi Watanabe)
- "Taste Of Tokyo" by Band Of Pleasure (features James Gadson)
- "Teatime In Tokyo" by Helmut Zacharias
- "Teknokyo" by DHS
- "Theme From Tokyo Bullet" by Powdered Rhino Horns
- "The Third Chamber: Part 5 – 7pm Tokyo Shrine by Loop Guru
- "This Is Tokyo Rose" by Tokyo Rose
- "Ticket To Tokyo" by Mal Waldron & Jim Pepper
- "Time In Tokyo" by Bill Nelson
- "Time Is A Passer-By (In Tokyo)" by Frank Chickens
- "TOKYO!!" by Sana TOKYO!!
- "Tokio" by Bit-Max
- "Tokio" by Jack Payne (bandleader)
- "Tokio" by Kenji Sawada
- "Tokio" by Laura Branigan
- "Tokio" by Lenny Mac Dowell
- "Tokio" by Liverpool Five
- "Tokio 1964" by Peter Kreuder
- "Tokio Airport" by Metal Boys
- "Tokio Bang!" by Soft Ballet
- "Tokio Blues" by Irving Berlin
- "Tokio Dream" by Makoto Horiuchi
- "Tokio Lovers" by Pepe Jaramillo
- "Tokyo" by 10cc
- "Tokyo" by A Flock of Seagulls
- "Tokyo" by ADX
- "Tokyo" by At Vance
- "Tokyo" by Athlete (from their album Beyond the Neighbourhood)
- "Tokyo" by Attack
- "Tokyo" by Base Ball Bear (from their album Detective Boys)
- "Tokyo" by Bebe Rexha
- "Tokyo" by The Books
- "Tokyo" by Brian Ice
- "Tokyo" by Bruce Cockburn (from his album Humans; #44 on RPM in 1980)
- "Tokyo" by B'z (from their album Love Me, I Love You)
- "Tokyo" by Carola Häggkvist
- "Tokyo" by Chips
- "Tokyo" by Classix Nouveaux
- "Tokyo" by Danny Saucedo (from his album Heart Beats)
- "Tokyo" by Darrell Mansfield Band
- "Tokyo" by David Boydell
- "Tokyo" by Dirty Looks
- "Tokyo" by Dollar
- "Tokyo" by Donna Summer
- "Tokyo" by Eikichi Yazawa (from his album Heart)
- "Tokyo" by Fargo
- "Tokyo" by Forcefield III
- "Tokyo" by Gabi Delgado
- "Tokyo" by GaGaGa SP
- "Tokyo" by Geoffrey Downes & The New Dance Orchestra
- "Tokyo" by Gruppo Sportivo
- "Tokyo" by Hans Vandenburg & Ajax Supporters
- "Tokyo" by Hirakawachi Itchōme
- "Tokyo" by Hurricane
- "Tokyo" by Imagine Dragons
- "Tokyo" by Jerry Donahue
- "Tokyo" by Jinco
- "Tokyo" by Keisuke Kuwata
- "Tokyo" by Kururi
- "Tokyo" by Legendary Stardust Cowboy
- "Tokyo" by Lianne La Havas
- "Tokyo" by Lil' Mark
- "Tokyo" by Lili & Sussie
- "Tokyo" by Masaharu Fukuyama
- "Tokyo" by Masashi Sada (from his album Yume Kaikisen)
- "Tokyo" by Mr. Children (from their album Supermarket Fantasy)
- "Tokyo" by My Pace
- "Tokyo" by Nevada
- "Tokyo" by Numbers Radio
- "Tokyo" by Owl City
- "Tokyo" by Paul Oakenfold
- "Tokyo" by Remioromen (from their album Kachou Fuugetsu)
- "Tokyo" by RM (rapper) of BTS
- "Tokyo" by Richie Beirach
- "Tokyo" by Rikki and the Last Days of Earth
- "Tokyo" by Rockwell
- "Tokyo" by Rod McKuen
- "Tokyo" by Science
- "Tokyo" by Shogo Hamada
- "Tokyo" by Sound Tribe Sector 9
- "Tokyo" by Steve Gibbs
- "Tokyo" by Sunny Day Service
- "Tokyo" by Telekinesis
- "Tokyo" by The Thompson Twins
- "Tokyo" by Tino Casal
- "Tokyo" by Tokyo (Robby Musenbichler)
- "Tokyo" by Toshinori Kondo, Eraldo Bernocchi, Bill Laswell
- "Tokyo" by Unsteady
- "Tokyo" by Vinyl Theatre
- "Tokyo" by Warren Carr
- "Tokyo" by White Lies
- "Tokyo" by w-inds.
- "Tokyo" by The Wombats
- "Tokyo" by Yashiki Takajin (from his album Mood Yume Miru Otoko)
- "Tokyo" by Yoeko Kurahashi
- "Tokyo" by Yui
- "Tokyo Alley" by ***** Hyman
- "Tokyo Amazon" by Stroke
- "Tokyo Bay Blues" by Ann Lewis (musician)
- "Tokyo Bijin" by Yuko Nakazawa
- "Tokyo Biyori" by Tomiko Van
- "Tokyo Blue" by Charles McPherson (musician)
- "Tokyo Blue" by Najee
- "Tokyo Blues" by Horace Silver
- "Tokyo Blues" by John Kaizan Neptune
- "Tokyo Blues" by Mark Lindsay
- "Tokyo Boogie Boogie Night" by Keito Saito & Axel Zwingenberger
- "Tokyo Bootlegger Man" by David Lindley (musician)
- "Tokyo Boy" by Indochine (band)
- "Tokyo Boy" by Ra
- "Tokyo Boy" by Sandra Kim
- "Tokyo Breaks" by Tilt (British band)
- "Tokyo Butterfly" by Jerry Smith
- "Tokyo By Night" by Gina T
- "Tokyo By Night" by Hook N Sling Ft. Karin Park
- "Tokyo By Night" by Toshiro Mayuzumi
- "Tokyo City" by The Slickers
- "Tokyo Cosmopolitan" by Jamaaladeen Tacuma
- "Tokyo Dawn" by Doc Scott
- "Tokyo Days" by Yuna Ito
- "Tokyo Dreamer" by Beat Culture
- "Tokyo Drift (Fast and the Furious)" by Teriyaki Boyz
- "Tokyo Drift" by Bass Mekanik
- "Tokyo Drift" by Yung Lean
- "Tokyo Drive" by Aux 88
- "Tokyo Drive" by TOKIO
- "Tokyo Dub" by Juno Reactor
- "Tokyo by Charmaine
- "Tokyo Express" by Starfish Pool
- "Tokyo Express" by Subtara
- "Tokyo Fantasy" by Alessandra Mussolini
- "Tokyo Fever" by J Boss Band (Jürgen Boss)
- "Tokyo Flyer" by Rah Band
- "Tokyo Girl" by Ace of Base
- "Tokyo Girl" by Guru Guru
- "Tokyo Girl" by Michael Fortunati (entry on Italian Wikipedia)
- "Tokyo Girl" by Minako Honda
- "Tokyo Girl" by Shogun
- "Tokyo Girls" by Tik and Tok
- "Tokyo Glitterati" by Vector Lovers
- "Tokyo Guitar" by Hank Marvin
- "Tokyo Heartwash" by Glamorous Hooligan
- "Tokyo High Life" by Dieter Reith
- "Tokyo Highway" by Kyary Pamyu Pamyu
- "Tokyo Hotel Room" by Woodpigeon + Norman Blake
- "Tokyo Is Calling" by Marko Albrecht (under the name 'Mark 'Oh')
- "Tokyo Joe" by Bertie Higgins
- "Tokyo Joe" by Bryan Ferry
- "Tokyo Joe" by Matchbox (band)
- "Tokyo Joe (One Roll From Paradise)" by Wigwam (Finnish band)
- "Tokyo Kid" by Jean-Michel Jarre
- "Tokyo Lady" by Masayoshi Takanaka
- "Tokyo Love" by Cargoe
- "Tokyo Love Hotel" by Rina Sawayama
- "Tokyo Mater" by Winged Beat
- "Tokyo Melody" by Helmut Zacharias
- "Tokyo Midnight" by Ai Otsuka
- "Tokyo Night" by Mandy Gordon
- "Tokyo Nights" by Bandzai!
- "Tokyo Nights" by Bee Gees
- "Tokyo Nights" by Krokus
- "Tokyo Nights" by Nick Stoynoff (on album by Solarstone)
- "Tokyo Nights" by Room 101
- "Tokyo Nights" by Rob Mullins
- "Tokyo Nights" by The Ventures
- "Tokyo Nights" by Utada Hikaru
- "Tokyo Nights" by Zane And Hogan With Kibbe
- "Tokyo Nitelife" by Eskobar (a drum and bass tune)
- "Tokyo No Yoake" by Deep Rooted
- "Tokyo, Oklahoma" by John Anderson
- "Tokyo Olympiad" by Toshiro Mayuzumi
- "Tokyo Pace" by John Kaizan Neptune
- "Tokyo Panorama" by Toshiro Mayuzumi
- "Tokyo Polka" by Country Fever
- "Tokyo Racer" by Les Jardiniers
- "Tokyo Rain" by Fetus Productions
- "Tokyo Rain" by Mastermind
- "Tokyo Return" by Dave Grusin
- "Tokyo Rimshot" by The Walker Brothers
- "Tokyo Rising" by Burning Rain
- "Tokyo Rising" by Nikki Richards
- "Tokyo Road" by Stranger
- "Tokyo Road" by Bon Jovi
- "Tokyo Rock'n Rollers" by 5X
- "Tokyo Room" by Peter Daltrey and Damien Youth
- "Tokyo Rose" by Chapman Whitney
- "Tokyo Rose" by David Feinstein (from Elf (band))
- "Tokyo Rose" by Focus
- "Tokyo Rose" by The Good Men
- "Tokyo Rose" by Hogsnort Rupert
- "Tokyo Rose" by Idle Eyes
- "Tokyo Rose" by Kamikaze
- "Tokyo Rose" by Riot
- "Tokyo Rose" by The Rods
- "Tokyo Rose" by Shok Paris
- "Tokyo Rose" by UK Subs
- "Tokyo Rose Sings The Blues" by Richie Cole (musician)
- "Tokyo Rush" by Brisk & Vagabond vs. Uraken
- "Tokyo Sally" by Creation (Japanese band)
- "Tokyo Scenario" by Unison Square Garden
- "Tokyo-Scope" by The Mitgang Audio
- "Tokyo Shuffle" by Breakfast Band
- "Tokyo...Singin' In The City" by Masayoshi Takanaka
- "Tokyo Smoke” by Cage the Elephant
- "Tokyo Sound Machine" by T-Square (band)
- "Tokyo Soundscape" by The Clarke & Ware Experiment (Vince Clarke & Martyn Ware)
- "Tokyo Stealth Fighter" by Dave Angel
- "Tokyo Storm Warning" by Elvis Costello
- "Tokyo Streets" by Glamour Cult
- "The Tokyo Story" by Happy Ever After
- "Tokyo Subway" by Slam (band)
- "Tokyo Sue" by Susan
- "Tokyo Summer" by Mounties
- "Tokyo Sun" by Russ Gabriel
- "Tokyo Sunrise" by LP
- "Tokyo Sunset" by Peter Weekers & Francis Goya
- "Tokyo Taxi" by The Accadians
- "Tokyo Telacom" by Aux 88
- "Tokyo to iu katasumi" by Morning Musume
- "Tokyo Tiger" by 22 Pistepirkko
- "Tokyo To Kokomo" by Peter Gallway
- "Tokyo Tokyo" by 808 State
- "Tokyo Tokyo" by D-Essex
- "Tokyo Tokyo" by Die Raketen
- "Tokyo Town" by Sarah
- "Tokyo Town Pages" by HASYMO (an alias of Yellow Magic Orchestra)
- "Tokyo Traffic" by Hot Lizard
- "Tokyo Trains" by David Harrow
- "Tokyo Travel" by The Future Sound of London
- "Tokyo Twilight" by Santo & Johnny
- "Tokyo Twist" by Tone Band
- "Tokyo (Vampires & Wolves)" by The Wombats
- "Tokyo Vibes" by Hypertrophy
- "Tokyo Victory" by Southern All Stars
- "Tokyo Voix" by Gennaro Le Fosse
- "Tokyo (We Want To Go To)" by Komputer
- "Tokyo Woman" by Roy Gaines & Mitsuyoshi Azuma
- "Tokyorio" by Chaplin Band
- "Tokyo's Burning" by Anarchy
- "Tokyo's Burning" by Genuine Brandish
- "Tokyo's Coolest Sound" by Pizzicato Five
- "Tokyo's On Fire" by W.A.S.P.
- "Tokyo's Theme" by Roland Alphonso
- "Tony Goes To Tokyo (And Rides The Bullet Train)" by The Revox Cadets
- "Tonight in Tokyo" by Sandie Shaw
- "Train To Tokyo" by Thomas Schumacher & Toby Izui (techno tune)
- "Trip To Tokyo" by Dekstrom
- "The Trip To Tokyo" by Nollaig Casey & Arty McGlynn
- "Truth (Tokyo Noir)" by Time Machine
- "Turn Around In Tokyo" by The Babys
- "Twilight In Tokyo" by Buck Ram
- "Una Sera Di Tokio" by Sandra Alexandra
- "Walk In Tokyo" by Gladstone Anderson
- "Welcome to Tokyo" by Sandaime J Soul Brothers from Exile Tribe
- "Welcome to Tokyo, Otis Clay" by Clinton
- "What’s The Time In Tokyo" by Marcella Detroit
- "When It's Cherry Time in Tokio" by James P. Johnson
- "When Tokyo?" by Eric Gale
- "Woman from Tokyo" by Deep Purple
- "Woman In Tokyo" by Mega NRG Man
- "Work Away Tokyo Day" by Andy Partridge
- "Y.S. Tangled In Tokyo" by Haruomi Hosono and Bill Laswell
- "You And Not Tokio" by Marquess feat Alexandra Ungureanu

=== Songs without "Tokyo" or "Tokio" in the title ===
- 109 by AKB48
- "10.20 From Shibuya" by Corduroy (band)
- "Akasaka After Dark" by Brenda Lee; Del Kacher And His Sonics
- "Aoyama Dub" by Hi Tech Roots Dynamics
- "Asakusa Dub" by Hi Tech Roots Dynamics
- "Asakusa Rock" by Lizard
- "Azabu Dub" by Hi Tech Roots Dynamics
- "The Barber of Shibuya" by Alex McMurray
- "Boulevard" by Dan Byrd
- "Bushwick To Shin-Juku" by Finsta Bundy
- "Dig You Later (A Hubba-Hubba-Hubba)" by Perry Como
- "Don't Make Me Wait" by Bomb The Bass
- "Dusted" by Leftfield
- "East Side/West Side" by Slow Pain
- "Fancy" by Iggy Azalea
- "Get Up! (Before the Night Is Over)(J-Wave Mix)" by Technotronic
- "Ginza" by Johnny Moore (trumpeter)
- "Ginza Dub" by Hi Tech Roots Dynamics
- "Ginza Lights" by The Ventures
- "Ginza Ska" by The Ventures
- "Hand Held In Black And White" by Dollar
- "Harajuko Dub" by Hi Tech Roots Dynamics
- "Heartache All Over The World" by Elton John
- "Hobo Scratch" by Malcolm McLaren
- "Kamata Hollywood City" by Gun Club
- "Lexington Queen" by Ryuichi Sakamoto (Lexington Queen was the name of a nightclub in Tokyo)
- "Meguro" by Endy Chow
- "Meguro" by Endy Chow and Fiona Sit
- "Meguro Dub" by Hi Tech Roots Dynamics
- "My Army of Lovers" by Army of Lovers
- "Nairobi To London" by Jahawi (on a Solarstone album)
- "Narita" by Riot
- "Narita Express" by Russ Gabriel
- "Navy Blue" by Diane Renay
- "On The Ginza" by Wayne Shorter
- "Pit Inn" by Fruitcake
- "Roppongi" by Jeff Baxter, Teddy Castellucci, James Harrah, Buzz Feiten
- "Roppongi Crossing" by Rob Mullins
- "Roppongi Panic" by Candy Dulfer
- "Roppongi Street" by The Nolans
- "Roppongi Suicide" by Asia Gang
- "Roppongi Roppongi" by Vodka Collins
- "Salsa Rappsody" by Modern Romance
- "Shibuya Dub" by Hi Tech Roots Dynamics
- "Shibuya Screen" by Bill Nelson
- "Shinjuku Dub" by Hi Tech Roots Dynamics
- "Shinjuku Twilight" by Eddie Higgins
- "Shintaro" by Men at Work
- "Shower" by The Mountain Goats
- "Sound From Shinjuku" by Ital Horns Meets Bush Chemists (featuring Rico Rodriguez)
- "Sushi Girl" by The Tubes
- "Touch" by Lori and the Chameleons
- "Two 'D's From Shinjyuku, Dig & Dug" by Billy Harper & Jon Faddis
- "Ueno Park 5AM" by Mario Piu & Jurgen Cecconi
- "The Ultimate Showdown of Ultimate Destiny" by Lemon Demon
- "Utsukushii Shibuya" by Ozma
- "Vienna Calling" by Falco
- "Wake Up" by Hilary Duff

== Songs with videos of Tokyo ==
These songs, while not having Tokyo in their names, lyrics, or in content, have, in their (promotional) videos, scenes of Tokyo.

- "I Love The Things You Do To Me" by Balaam and the Angel
- "Love Missile F1-11" by Sigue Sigue Sputnik
- "Just Can't Get Enough" by The Black Eyed Peas
- "Motorcycle Emptiness" by The Manic Street Preachers
- "Rather Be" by Clean Bandit featuring Jess Glynne
- "SuperLove" by Charli XCX
- "Loca" by Álvaro Soler
- "Mizu" by AGA
- "Official Start" by Ian Chan
- "I Will Possess Your Heart" by Death Cab for Cutie
