= Nits (band) =

Dutch pop group

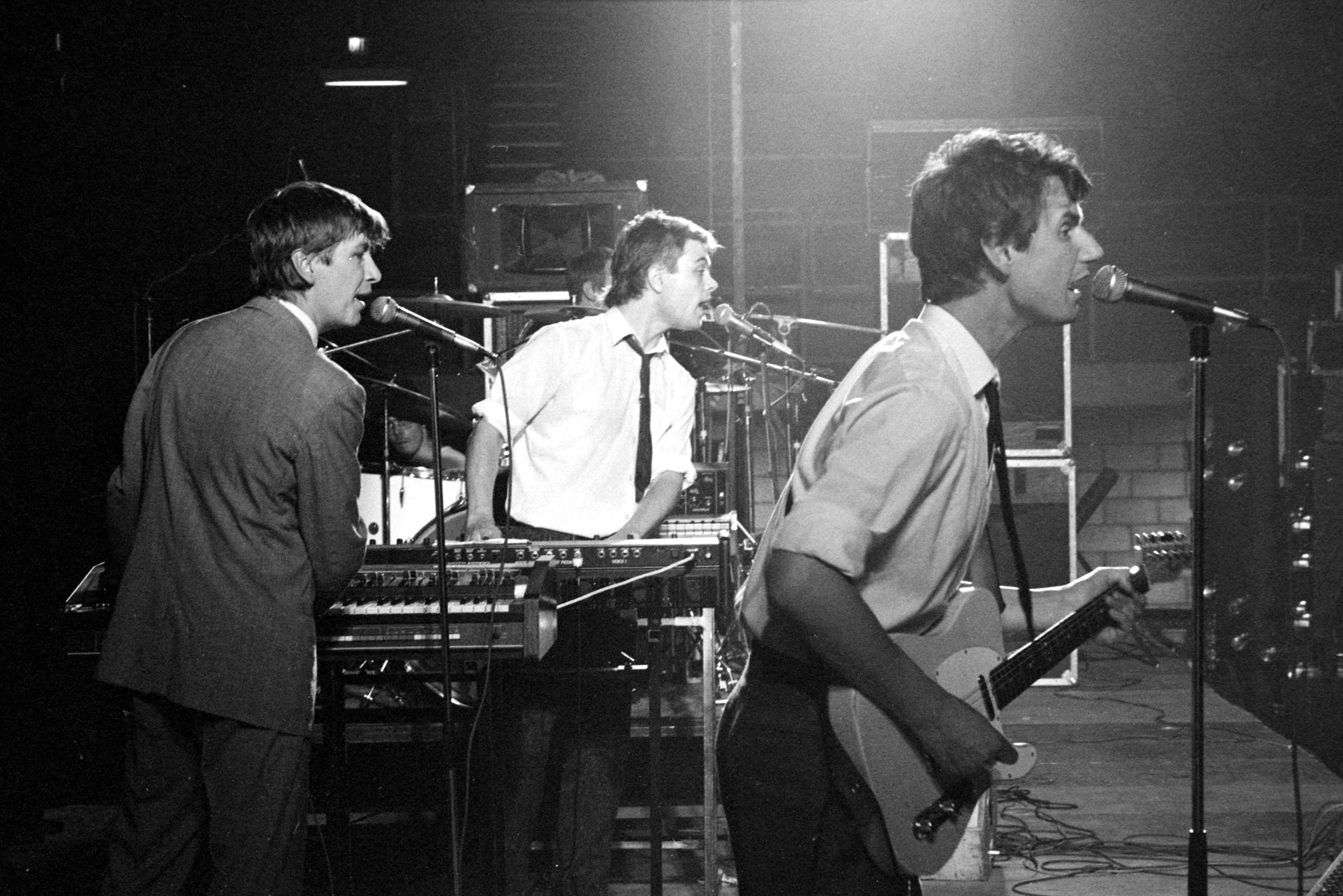
- The Nits in Beyneshal, Haarlem 1982

Background information
- Origin: Amsterdam, Netherlands
- Genres: Pop rock, pop, progressive rock, new wave
- Years active: 1974–present
- Labels: CBS Records International Columbia Records; PIAS Recordings Werf Records
- Members: Henk Hofstede; Rob Kloet; Robert Jan Stips
- Past members: Alex Roelofs; Michiel Peters; Joke Geraets; Peter Meuris; Martin Bakker; Arwen Linneman; Laetitia van Krieken
- Website: nits.nl

Nits (known until 1989 as The Nits) are a Dutch pop group founded in 1974. Their musical style has varied considerably over the years, as has their line-up with the core of Henk Hofstede (the group's lead singer and lyricist), Rob Kloet, drummer, and Robert Jan Stips (Supersister, Gruppo Sportivo, Golden Earring), keyboards.

Their biggest hit in the Netherlands was "Nescio" (1983), a tribute to the Dutch author Jan Hendrik Frederik Grönloh. The major hit that brought the band to the attention of an international audience was "In the Dutch Mountains" (1987). Other well-known Nits songs include "J.O.S. Days", "Adieu, Sweet Bahnhof" and "Sketches of Spain". Top 10 albums include Omsk (1983), In the Dutch Mountains (1987), Urk (1989), Doing the Dishes (2008) and Hotel Europa (2015).

== Early history ==
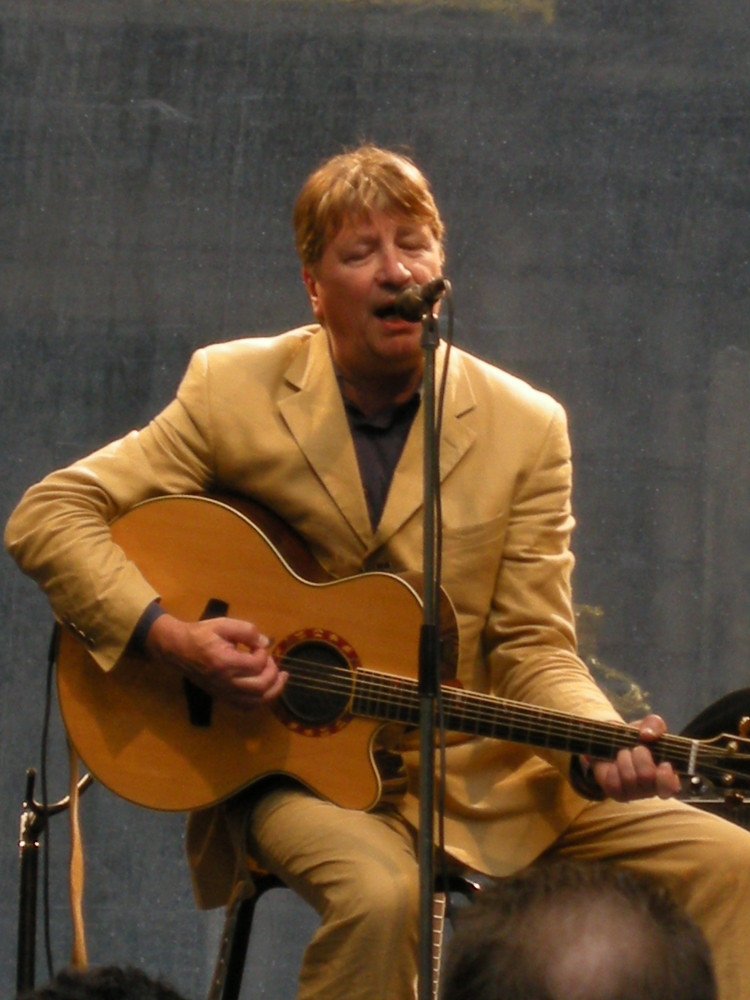
Henk Hofstede

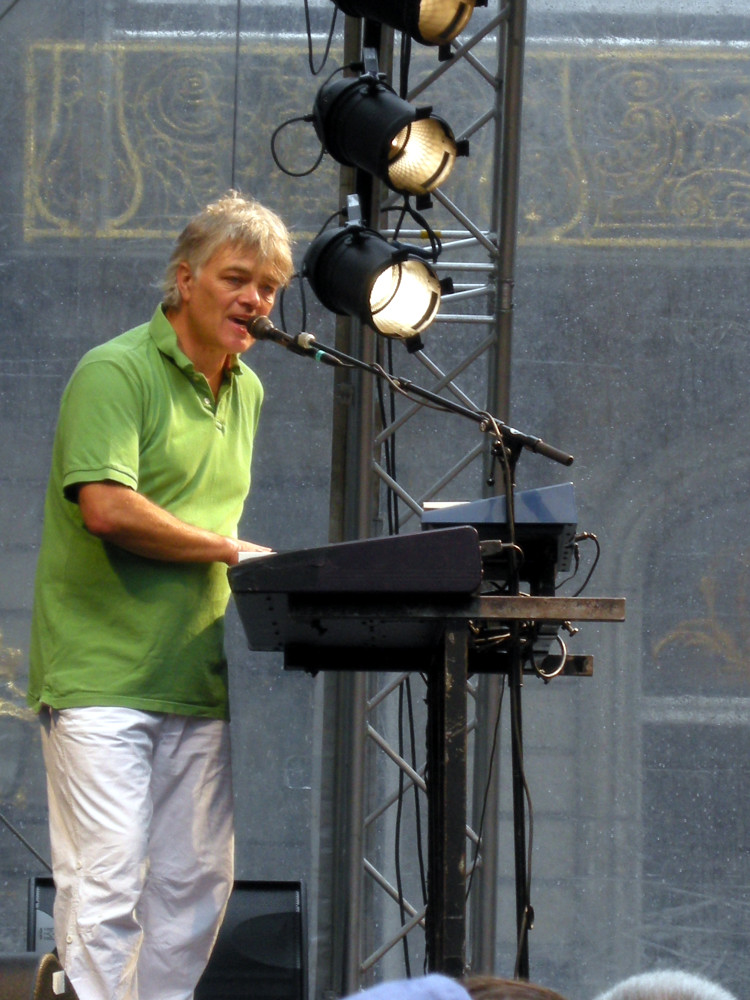
Robert Jan Stips

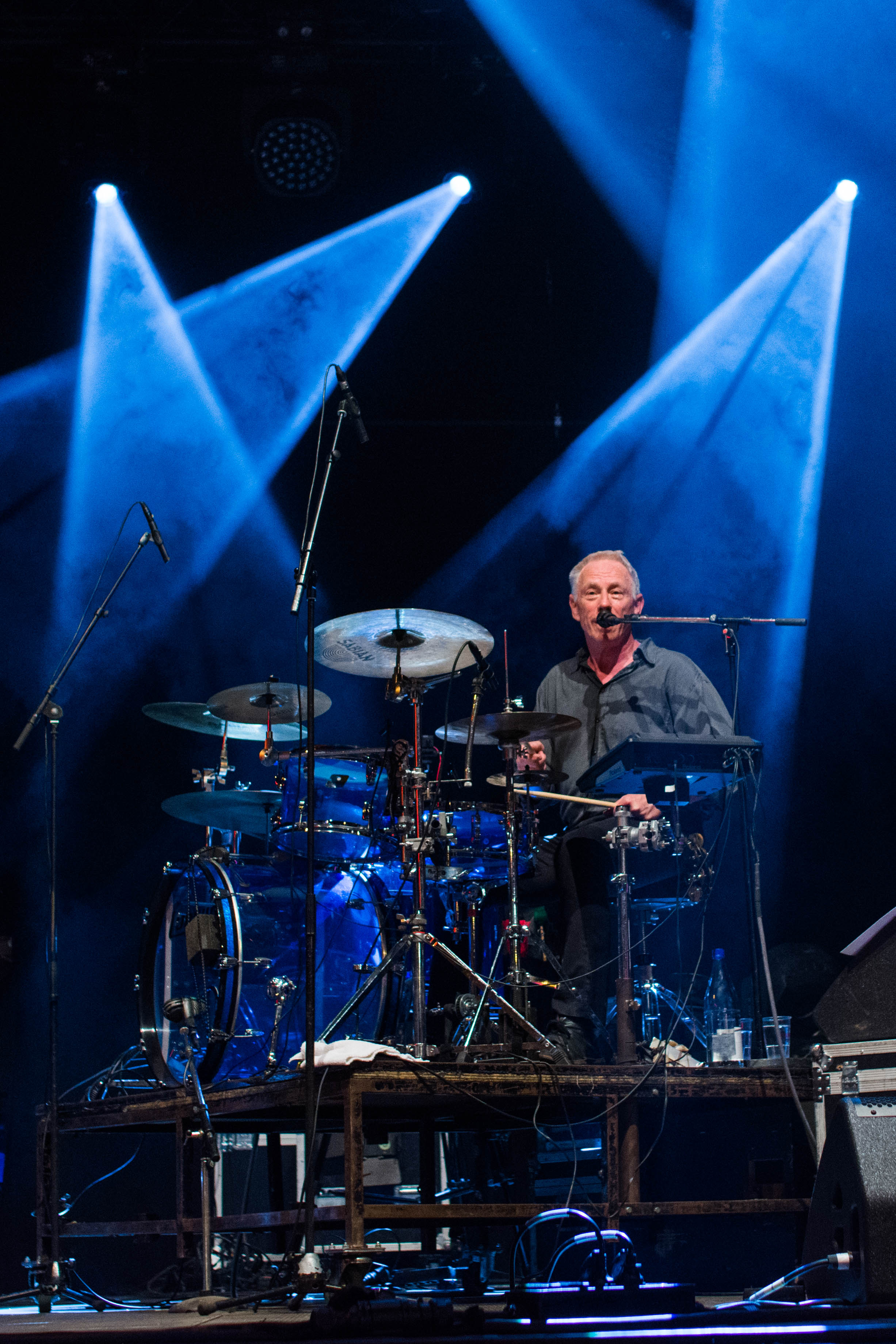
Rob Kloet

The Nits originally consisted of Henk Hofstede (vocals, guitar), Alex Roelofs (bass), Michiel Peters (guitar) and Rob Kloet (drums). Influenced by British pop music, especially the Beatles, they also incorporated influences from new wave music into their sound. They made their live debut in 1974, and released their self-financed, limited-run debut LP, The Nits, in 1978. This brought them to the attention of Columbia Records, for whom The Nits would continue to record for the next 22 years. Their major-label debut, Tent (1979), carried on the new wave style of The Nits, but was considerably more polished, partly due to the influence of producer Robert Jan Stips. On New Flat (1980) and Work (1981), which made increasing use of synthesisers, "Hofstede reveals a growing aptitude for creating little emotional postcards."

"The obvious derivativeness on the Nits' early albums could have been written off as cut-rate local flirtation/reassembly of the real thing from Britain and America (Beatles, Talking Heads, etc.). In retrospect, however, those records could be seen as learning experiences of a world-class band now deserving international attention."

== Omsk & Adieu, Sweet Bahnhof ==
In the meantime, the group had been developing their sound on their numerous European tours. Many songs were radically reworked for live performance, a practice the group would continue throughout their career. Between the group's experiments with different arrangements, and the addition of Stips to the line-up, The Nits gradually moved toward a more distinctive musical style, with Kloet playing a wide range of percussion, and Stips' keyboards used to produce a lusher sound. Omsk showcased the new Nits sound with songs like "A Touch of Henry Moore", almost entirely based around Kloet's percussion, and the dramatic hit single "Nescio". The follow-up "Adieu, Sweet Bahnhof" was another hit, but tensions between the group and producer Jaap Eggermont led to the departure of Peters, and a change in the group's working methods. In future, they would produce their own material and bring in guest musicians as required.

== Henk, In the Dutch Mountains & Urk ==
The album Henk - which included such classic songs as Bike In Head, Home Before Dark and Port Of Amsterdam - was recorded as a three-piece, after which new bassist Joke Geraets became the first female member of The Nits, completing the line-up that would go on to enjoy commercial success with single and album In the Dutch Mountains (1987). Its title track became a European hit and one of the band's biggest. It was accompanied by a video with just the image of man in a rowing boat. Follow-up J.O.S. Days was a successful single as well. The group's extensive tours during this period led to the accomplished live triple-LP Urk (1989) which became their best-selling album. The live version of Adieu Sweet Bahnhof was released as a single, again accompanied by a video. It became a Top 30 hit for the band in Holland. Urk also featured live versions of songs from Hat, the band's 1988 6-song EP, including popular songs like The Dream, Bauhaus Chair and The Train.

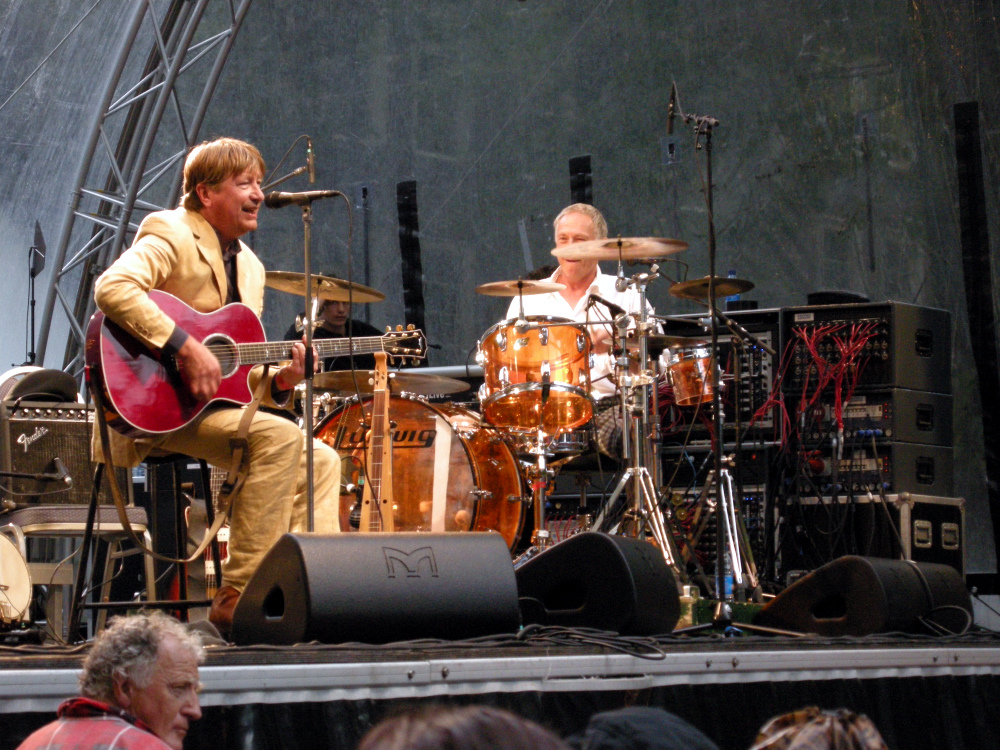

== Giant Normal Dwarf, Ting & Hjuvi ==
When Geraets fell ill with a muscular disease, meaning that she was unable to play bass, the group (now using the shortened name "Nits", often rendered in capitals to emphasise the absence of the definite article) continued as a trio. Giant Normal Dwarf (1990) was a kaleidoscopic affair which at first glance seemed like a return to the psychedelia of "I Am the Walrus" and "Glass Onion" but was actually inspired by Hofstede's desire to write musical fairy tales for his newborn child. The subsequent album Ting (1992) was a return to a much more minimalist approach, both with respect to the emphasis on the piano and the inspiration of Philip Glass on several songs. At the same time as working on Ting, the group were also preparing material for a TV special with the Netherlands Radio Symphony Orchestra. Mainly composed by Stips, this was later issued as the album Hjuvi - A Rhapsody In Time.

== dA dA dA, Nest & Vest ==
The 1994 album dA dA dA was something of a return to basics, with "traditional" songwriting largely replacing the quirkiness of recent Nits releases, and the group's early influences once again to the fore. The album was the first Nits material to gain a release in the United States. Ironically for a group that had always performed in English, regarding it as a necessary evil for international success, recognition in the major English-speaking markets always eluded them. dA dA dA, despite critical acclaim in both the UK and USA, still failed to break the group in either market.

In 1995, the group released Nest, a 20-track retrospective album, and the accompanying tour ended on a high note with a concert broadcast live on television from the Uitmarkt festival. Stips then left to pursue a solo career.

A one-hour VHS video compilation Vest, 16 video clips, 1984–1995 was also released, featuring short films to accompany the songs, filmed on a low budget by the band themselves, with a 16mm cine camera.

== Alankomaat, Wool & 1974 ==
The group continued, releasing the introspective albums Alankomaat (1998) - which featured the singles Sister Rosa and Robinson, and fan favourite Three Sisters - and Wool (2000), followed by another retrospective, Hits.

The group continues to perform to this day following the return of keyboard player Robert Jan Stips in 2003 for the release of the album 1974, commemorating the year of their formation.

== Les Nuits, Doing the Dishes & Strawberry Wood ==
A new album titled Les Nuits was released in October 2005. Three of the songs on the album - The Laundrette, The Key Shop and The Pizzeria - were about the murder of film director Theo Van Gogh, which happened in the street where Henk Hofstede lived. The title track of the album would pop up on the band's setlists for many years to come. After an extensive tour and some solo activity, the band returned to the studio in mid-2007 to record the album Doing the Dishes, released in January 2008. The album went top 10 in the Netherlands (for the first time since URK in 1989), had an airplay hit in The Flowers and was once again followed by a tour. Many of the album's songs were performed live. In 2009, the next album and tour, Strawberry Wood, a top 15 hit on the Dutch album chart, followed. It was preceded by the single Hawelka.

== Malpensa, NITS? & Hotel Europa ==
In early 2012, the Nits released the album Malpensa, to positive reviews and fan reactions. It contains a collaboration with Colin Benders of Kyteman on the track "Bad Government". The songs "Love-Locks" and "Man on a Wire" were released as singles, as well as "Bad Government", which was re-done with Perquisite and Dazzled Kid for the single remix. The song "Schwebebahn" finds the band singing in German for the first time. In 2013, the Nits composed and produced the music of the documentary The King of Mount Ventoux by director Fons Feyaerts. The 7-track soundtrack was released on iTunes and Spotify. 2014 and 2015 focused on the '40 years of NITS' anniversary. A 3CD compilation album spanning the band's whole career was released in 2014, which contained three unreleased tracks. In March 2015, the band released Hotel Europa, a double live album with songs ranging from Giant Normal Dwarf (1990) to Malpensa (2012), with exception of a live version of "In the Dutch Mountains". The album received rave reviews and entered the Dutch album charts at #5, making it their highest charting album since Urk (#3, 1989) and their first Top 10 album since Doing the Dishes (#8, 2008).

In November 2015, all Nits albums were released on digital platforms such as Spotify, Deezer and Apple Music.

== TING! with Scapino Ballet, trilogy angst, Knot & NEON ==
In 2016 the band played 20 shows with Scapino Ballet Rotterdam. The show, entitled TING!, featured 20 NITS songs including "Nescio", "Five Fingers", "The Long Song", "The Swimmers" and "In the Dutch Mountains". More than 20,000 people saw the show in Rotterdam.

In August 2017 new album and tour angst were announced for September. Preceded by the songs "Flowershop Forget-Me-Not", "Yellow Socks & Angst" and "Pockets Of Rain". On Friday September 15 "Yellow Socks & Angst" was added to Spotify's popular New Music Friday playlist. angst was released by the band's own WERF Records and largely sold through the band's own website. Despite this, on the back of very good reviews in OOR, Algemeen Dagblad and Lust For Life a.o., and promo shows on Dutch Radio, it entered the Dutch Album Top 100 at #40. The European 2017-2018 tour started in September 2017. Early November 2017 a 12-second promo for the tour was broadcast on Dutch TV, featuring "Port Of Amsterdam", from the albums Henk (1986) and URK (1989, live). Late November the band played "Radio Orange" on Holland's biggest TV show De Wereld Draait Door, after which angst returned to the iTunes Top 15. Early December NITS played the same song on Belgian TV show "De Zevende Dag". In January 2018 Spotify released the playlist This is: NITS featuring 40 songs from Tent (1979) all the way up to angst (2017). From Tutti Ragazzi to In The Dutch Mountains and from Giant Normal Dwarf to Pockets Of Rain.

On November 22, 2019 Knot was released to favourable reviews in OOR, Parool and Written in Music a.o.

On Monday May 16, De Werf - the studio, archive and base of operations of the band for more than 40 years - tragically went up in flames. A big loss for the band and the music world in general. The new Nits album was completed just before the fire. In December 2021, the video for single Beromünster was still filmed there.

On September 30, 2022, the album NEON was released, the third in a trilogy with angst (2017) and Knot (2019). The album was preceded by the singles and videos Sunday Painter, The Ghost Ranch and the aforementioned Beromünster. On the day of release Spotify included the song Shadow Letter in its popular New Music Friday playlist, like the other singles before.

== Dial Nits, Tree House Fire and 50th Anniversary ==
After the international NEON Tour, the band worked on the mini-album Tree House Fire in Studio 150 in Amsterdam in 2023. The first single The Tree was released on January 12, 2024, which also kicked off the 50th anniversary year, including an international tour and anniversary shows in Carré, Amsterdam.

On Sunday, January 14, the band posted The Tree video to their Facebook and Instagram pages with the words: The Tree…Oosterpark…Amsterdam…Autumn and Winter 2023 2024…

The album was released on January 19, with the song The Bird being placed in Spotify's New Music Friday playlist. OOR Magazine wrote: "Month Of May" and "Big Brown Building Burning" describe the fire quite directly. Then their imagination runs wild with events. In "The Bird" we experience the fire from the perspective of the bird in the tree next to the studio. The result can easily be added to the list of Nits classics. You can only wish one thing for anyone who is still making such beautiful music after fifty years: on to a hundred!

In the meantime, a podcast series about the band's 50-year career was also released. "Dial Nits" features core members Henk Hofstede, Rob Kloet and Robert Jan Stips in conversation, but also collaborators, friends and family from many different countries talking about the music and about the background stories to this unusual career of musicians from the Netherlands. The podcast can be heard on Spotify.

== Current and past members ==
The following people have been considered full members of the group:

- Henk Hofstede (main vocalist, guitar, some keyboards) - 1974 to present
- Rob Kloet (drums and percussion) - 1974 to present
- Alex Roelofs (bass, backing vocals) - 1974-81
- Michiel Peters (guitar, backing and some lead vocals) - 1974-85
- Robert Jan Stips (keyboards, backing and occasional lead vocals) - 1983-96, 2003 to present
- Joke Geraets (bass, guitar, some backing vocals) - 1986-91 (but inactive after 1989 due to illness)
- Pieter Meuris (violin) - 1991-6
- Martin Bakker (bass) - 1991-6
- Arwen Linnemann (bass) - 1998-2003
- Laetitia van Krieken (keyboards) - 1998-2004

== Lyrical themes ==
The group travel widely, and Hofstede's lyrics often concern his impressions of places he has been. The official Nits website includes a map showing the locations that the group has written songs about. Another common theme (to some extent overlapping the first) is songs inspired by works of art, literature and museum exhibits (e.g. "A Touch of Henry Moore", "Soap Bubble Box", "Nescio"). Many other songs are impressionistic, and many are concerned with the passing of time. Some albums include clusters of songs on a particular subject, for example In the Dutch Mountains contains several songs about Hofstede's childhood memories, Giant Normal Dwarf includes several fantasy songs set in a folkloric version of the Netherlands called Fountainland, and the later albums, particularly Les Nuits, include numerous songs on the subject of human mortality.

== Discography ==
- The Nits (1978)
- Tent (1979)
- New Flat (1980)
- Work (1981)
- Omsk (1983)
- Kilo (1983) (mini LP)
- Adieu, Sweet Bahnhof (1984)
- Henk (1986)
- In the Dutch Mountains (1987)
- Hat (1988) (mini LP)
- Urk (1989) (triple LP, double CD live album)
- Giant Normal Dwarf (1990)
- Hjuvi - A Rhapsody in Time (1992) (with the Netherlands Radio Symphony Orchestra)
- Ting (1992)
- dA dA dA (1994)
- Dankzij de Dijken (1995) (as FRITS, together with Freek de Jonge, in Dutch)
- Nest (1995) (compilation album; limited edition box set version included a CD of B-sides and rarities, entitled Quest, and a VHS compilation of Nits music videos, entitled Vest)
- In Concert (1996) (Radio Netherlands promotional release, recorded live in Brussels and Utrecht; features brief interview segments with Henk Hofstede, in English, corresponding to each track; insert includes a transcription of the interview segments, as well as French and Spanish translations)
- Alankomaat (1998)
- Hits (2000) (compilation album)
- Wool (2000)
- 1974 (2003)
- Les Nuits (2005)
- Doing the Dishes (2008)
- Strawberry Wood (2009)
- Malpensa (2012)
- NITS? (2014) (triple CD compilation album)
- Hotel Europa (2015) (double CD live album)
- angst (2017)
- The Golden Years of Dutch Pop Music (2018) (double CD compilation album singles A & B-sides)
- Knot (2019)
- NEON (2022)
- Tree House Fire (2024) (mini LP)

All of the group's albums have been re-issued on CD, except for their debut. In a 2017 interview, Hofstede indicated that their first recording would eventually be re-issued, however, "the problem is it's in somebody else's hands so there are difficulties. Until now we didn't feel it was that important but of course one day it will be there again. It's old stuff but it is part of our history."
