= New Flat =

Studio album by The Nits
- Released: 14 November 1980
- Recorded: August–September 1980 Arnold Muhren Studio, Volendam
- Genre: New wave
- Length: 40:42
- Label: Columbia
- Producer: Robert Jan Stips & The Nits

The Nits chronology
Tent (1979)	New Flat (1980)	Work (1981)

New Flat is an album by The Nits. It was released in 1980 by Columbia Records.

== Track listing ==
All tracks written by Henk Hofstede (HH) and Michiel Peters (MP).

1. New Flat – 2:45 (HH)
2. Holiday on Ice – 3:00 (HH)
3. Saragossa – 2:29 (MP)
4. Office at Night – 3:07 (HH)
5. Uncle on Mars – 3:52 (HH)
6. Statue – 3:18 (MP)
7. His First Object – 2:21 (HH)
8. Different Kitchen – 3:35 (HH)
9. Safety in Numbers – 3:12 (MP)
10. Bobby Solo – 2:09 (HH)
11. Zebra – 2:09 (MP)
12. Rubber Gloves – 2:34 (MP)
13. Bite Better Bark – 2:59 (HH)
14. Aloha Drums – 3:06 (MP)

== Personnel ==
=== The band ===
- Michiel Peters – vocals, guitar
- Alex Roelofs – bass, keyboards
- Henk Hofstede – vocals, keyboards
- Rob Kloet – drums
- Paul Telman – engineer
- Hans Schot – light

=== Additional musicians ===
- Aad Link – trumpet
- Robert Jan Stips – mouth organ

=== Technical staff ===
- Aad Link – engineer
- Robert Jan Stips – producer
- The Nits – producers
- Aad Link – mixing (Soundpush Blaricum)
- John Sonneveld – mixing (DMC Baarn)
- Robin Freeman – mixing (Relight)

=== Miscellaneous ===
- The Nits – arrangements
- Soss Music - publishing
- Joep Bruinje – photography
- The Nits – lay-out
