= Tent (album) =

Studio album by The Nits
- Released: 7 December 1979
- Recorded: June–October 1979
- Studio: Artisound, Amsterdam & Relight, Hilvarenbeek
- Genre: New wave
- Label: Columbia
- Producer: The Nits & Aad Link except Tutti Ragazzi & The Young Reporter : Robert Jan Stips

The Nits chronology
The Nits (1978)	Tent (1979)	New Flat (1980)

Tent is the second album by the Nits. It was released in 1979 by Columbia Records. It was the first album that entered the Dutch charts in early 1980, reaching No. 35.
"Tutti Ragazzi" was released as a single, reaching No. 22 in the Dutch Singles charts.

== Track listing ==
All tracks written by Henk Hofstede (HH) and Michiel Peters (MP).

=== Vinyl release ===
==== Side A ====
1. Tent – 2:07 (HH)
2. A to B; C to D – 3:01 (MP)
3. The Young Reporter – 2:42 (HH)
4. 4 Ankles – 2:27 (MP/HH)
5. Hook of Holland – 2:48 (HH)
6. Frozen Fred – 2:25 (MP)
7. Ping Pong – 2:33 (HH)

==== Side B ====
1. Tutti Ragazzi – 2:13 (HH)
2. Out of Suburbia – 2:38 (MP)
3. Bungalow – 2:42 (HH)
4. 1:30 – 3:08 (MP)
5. Johnny Said Silver – 2:46 (HH)
6. Who's the Killer – 2:29 (HH)
7. Take a Piece – 2:05 (HH)
8. Tent (Reprise) – 1:03 (HH)

=== CD release ===
1. Tent – 2:07 (HH)
2. A to B; C to D – 3:01 (MP)
3. The Young Reporter – 2:42 (HH)
4. 4 Ankles – 2:27 (MP/HH)
5. Hook of Holland – 2:48 (HH)
6. Frozen Fred – 2:25 (MP)
7. Ping Pong – 2:33 (HH)
8. Tutti Ragazzi – 2:13 (HH)
9. Out of Suburbia – 2:38 (MP)
10. Bungalow – 2:42 (HH)
11. 1:30 – 3:08 (MP)
12. Johnny Said Silver – 2:46 (HH)
13. Who's the Killer – 2:29 (HH)
14. Take a Piece – 2:05 (HH)
15. Tent (Reprise) – 1:03 (HH)
16. Umbrella – 3:10 (HH)
17. Some Other Night – 2:39 (MP)
18. Harrow Accident – 3:02 (MP)

== Personnel ==
=== The band ===
- Henk Hofstede – keyboards, vocals
- Rob Kloet – drums, backing vocals
- Alex Roelofs – bass, backing vocals
- Michiel Peters – guitar, vocals
- Paul Telman – engineer
- Hans Schot – transportation

=== Additional musicians ===
- The Tapes – backing vocals (track 12)

=== Technical staff ===
- The Nits – producers (except tracks 3 & 8)
- Aad Link – producer (except tracks 3 & 8)
- Robert Jan Stips – producer (tracks 3 & 8)
- Aad Link – engineer (Artisound)
- Eric van Tijn – engineer (Artisound)
- Robin Freeman – engineer (Relight)
- John Sonneveld – engineer (DMC Baarn)

=== Miscellaneous ===
- John Prins – photography (Fotografie BV)
- The Nits – design & lay-out
