= In the Dutch Mountains =

Studio album by The Nits
- Released: 30 October 1987
- Recorded: 28 July – 16 August 1987, Werf Studios, Amsterdam, Netherlands
- Genre: Pop
- Length: 46:14
- Label: Columbia
- Producer: The Nits

The Nits chronology
Henk (1986)	In the Dutch Mountains (1987)	Hat (1988)

Professional ratings
Review scores
Source	Rating
Allmusic	link

In the Dutch Mountains is an album by The Nits. It was released in October 1987 by Columbia Records.

== About the album ==
After the release of their meticulously assembled and produced previous album, Henk (1986), which ended up sounding somewhat lifeless, the band decided to go back to basics and record this, their next album, live to two-track in their own rehearsal space to, in their own words, "reproduce the special atmosphere of a Nits concert". As a result, the songs sound far more sparkling without becoming rough or rushed.

Lyrically, singer Hofstede delves into his childhood memories, conjuring up a vision of childhood life in the Netherlands in the 1950s and 1960s. The album cover reflects this, featuring actual historical Children's Benefit stamps. Even though they resemble young versions of all four band members, they are in fact real Dutch stamps from 1951.

In the Dutch Mountains was the Nits' most successful album to date and the first to gain a UK release. Its lead single and title track was a reasonable hit across the European continent, and is considered their signature song. In the Netherlands, two more singles were pulled off the album, "J.O.S. Days" and "The Panorama Man".

== Track listing ==
All tracks written by Hofstede, Stips, Kloet.

=== Vinyl release ===
==== Side A ====
1. In the Dutch Mountains – 3:26
2. J.O.S. Days – 3:13
3. Two Skaters – 6:51
4. Pelican and Penguin – 3:57
5. In a Play (Das Mädchen im Pelz) – 3:35
6. Oom-Pah-Pah – 1:21

==== Side B ====
1. The Panorama Man – 3:29
2. Mountain Jan – 4:41
3. One Eye Open – 3:16
4. An Eating House – 5:53
5. The Swimmer – 3:50
6. Good Night – 2:42

In 2010 a legal vinyl re-release came out on the Music On Vinyl label which added three extra bonus tracks, also available on the cd release, and an etching.

==== Side C ====
1. Strangers Of The Night - 4:27
2. The Magic Of Lassie – 1:37
3. Moon And Stars – 4:31

=== CD release ===
1. In the Dutch Mountains – 3:26
2. J.O.S. Days – 3:13
3. Two Skaters – 6:51
4. Pelican and Penguin – 3:57
5. In a Play (Das Mädchen im Pelz) – 3:35
6. Oom-Pah-Pah – 1:21
7. The Panorama Man – 3:29
8. Mountain Jan – 4:41
9. One Eye Open – 3:16
10. An Eating House – 5:53
11. The Swimmer – 3:50
12. Good Night – 2:42
13. Strangers of the Night – 4:27
14. The Magic of Lassie – 1:37
15. Moon and Stars – 4:31

== Personnel ==
=== The band ===
- Henk Hofstede – vocals, guitar
- Robert Jan Stips – keyboards, backing vocals
- Joke Geraets – double bass
- Rob Kloet – drums

=== Additional musicians ===
- Jaap van Beusekom – steel guitar
- Jolanda de Wit – backing vocals
- Saskia van Essen – backing vocals
- Lieve Geuens – backing vocals

=== Technical staff ===
- The Nits – producers
- Paul Telman – engineer

== Covers ==
The title song was covered by Dutch garage rock band Claw Boys Claw, on their 1988 album ‘’Hitkillers’’, and Dutch folk metal band Heidevolk, on their album ‘’Velua’’.
