= Senko (song) =

"Senkō, 閃光"

Single by Tomiko Van

from the album Van.
- Released: September 27, 2006
- Genre: J-pop, rock
- Label: Avex Trax
- Songwriter: Tomiko Van

Tomiko Van singles chronology
"Flower" (2006)	"Senkō, 閃光" (2006)	"Yumeji" (2006)

Senkō
- CD+DVD cover

"Senkō" (Japanese 閃光) is Tomiko Van's second single under the Avex Trax label. The single was released on September 27, 2006, in two formats, four months after her last single.

== Overview ==
"Senkō" is the second single to be released by solo artist Tomiko Van after the split up of the Japanese band Do As Infinity. The A-side song was used as the commercial song for the ringtone service site mu-mo, and for music.jp TV-CF. Online store, CD Japan, describes the title song as "a medium tempo track that's just perfect for autumn", and her official website simply describes it as a medium rock number.

A drastic change from her previous single, "Senkō" takes on a much darker tone than the up-tempo "Flower". Lyrically, the song is about the sorrows and inward struggles of a woman who is by herself. Instrumentally, the song uses heavy guitars to help in the overall dark tone the song takes.

== Track listing ==
=== CD only format ===
1. "Senkō" (閃光, Flash of Light)
2. "Mosaic"
3. "Senkō" -Instrumental-
4. "Mosaic" -Instrumental-

=== CD and DVD ===
==== CD portion ====
1. "Senkō" (閃光, Flash of Light)
2. "Mosaic"
3. "Senkō" -Instrumental-
4. "Mosaic" -Instrumental-

==== DVD portion ====
1. "Senkō" (Music Clip)

== Personnel ==
- Tomiko Van - vocals (both tracks)
- Ken Shibuya - drums (Track #1)
- Fumio Kawabuchi - bass (Track #1)
- Satoru Hiraide - programming, acoustic & electric guitars (Track #1)
- Yoshihisa Tokuda - acoustic guitar (Track #1)
- Shigeso Sasaki - drums (Track #2)
- Shintaro Jinbo - bass (Track #2)
- Masayoshi Murakami - programming, acoustic & electric guitars (Track #2)

== Charts ==
Release	Chart	Peak position	First week sales	Sales total
September 27, 2006	Oricon Daily Singles Chart	8		
September 27, 2006	Oricon Weekly Singles Chart	14	9,949	12,196
