= Flower (Tomiko Van song) =

Single by Tomiko Van

from the album Van.
- Released: June 7, 2006
- Genre: J-pop, rock
- Length: 17:53
- Label: Avex Trax
- Songwriter(s): Maki Ogawa, Tomiko Van

Tomiko Van singles chronology
"Flower" (2006)	"Senkō" (2006)

Flower
- CD only cover

"Flower" is Tomiko Van's debut single under the Avex Trax label. The single was released on June 7, 2006 in two formats.

== Overview ==
"Flower" is former Do As Infinity lead singer Tomiko Van's debut single. Released in two versions, CD only and CD+DVD, there are two different covers for the single, though the covers have very little differences to them. The A-side song "Flower" was used as the TBS drama Oishii Proposal theme song, and a piano version of the song was used for the sound track of the drama. The B-side "Brave" was used as the ending theme song for PlayStation 2 game Sengoku Basara 2.

Unlike most of the songs on her debut album, "Flower" is an up-tempo pop song with a feeling of summer to it. The song features guitars, an instrument that was not as prominent in her debut album, and is reminiscent of songs that she would sing during her times in Do As Infinity.

== Track listing ==
=== CD only format ===
1. "Flower" (Maki Ogawa, Katsumi Ōnishi) - 4:14
2. "Brave" (Tomiko Van, Katsumi Ōnishi) - 4:38
3. "Flower" -Instrumental- - 4:14
4. "Brave" -Instrumental- - 4:38

=== CD and DVD ===
==== CD portion ====
1. "Flower" (Maki Ogawa, Katsumi Ōnishi) - 4:14
2. "Brave" (Tomiko Van, Katsumi Ōnishi) - 4:38
3. "Flower" -Instrumental- - 4:14
4. "Brave" -Instrumental- - 4:38

==== DVD portion ====
1. "Flower" (Music Clip)

== TV performances ==
- June 2, 2006 - Music Fighter
- June 9, 2006 - Music Fighter

== Charts ==
Oricon Sales Chart (Japan)

Release	Chart	Peak position	First week sales	Sales total
June 7, 2006	Oricon Daily Singles Chart	7		
June 7, 2006	Oricon Weekly Singles Chart	10	14,342	18,802+
