= Gruppo Sportivo =

Dutch pop band

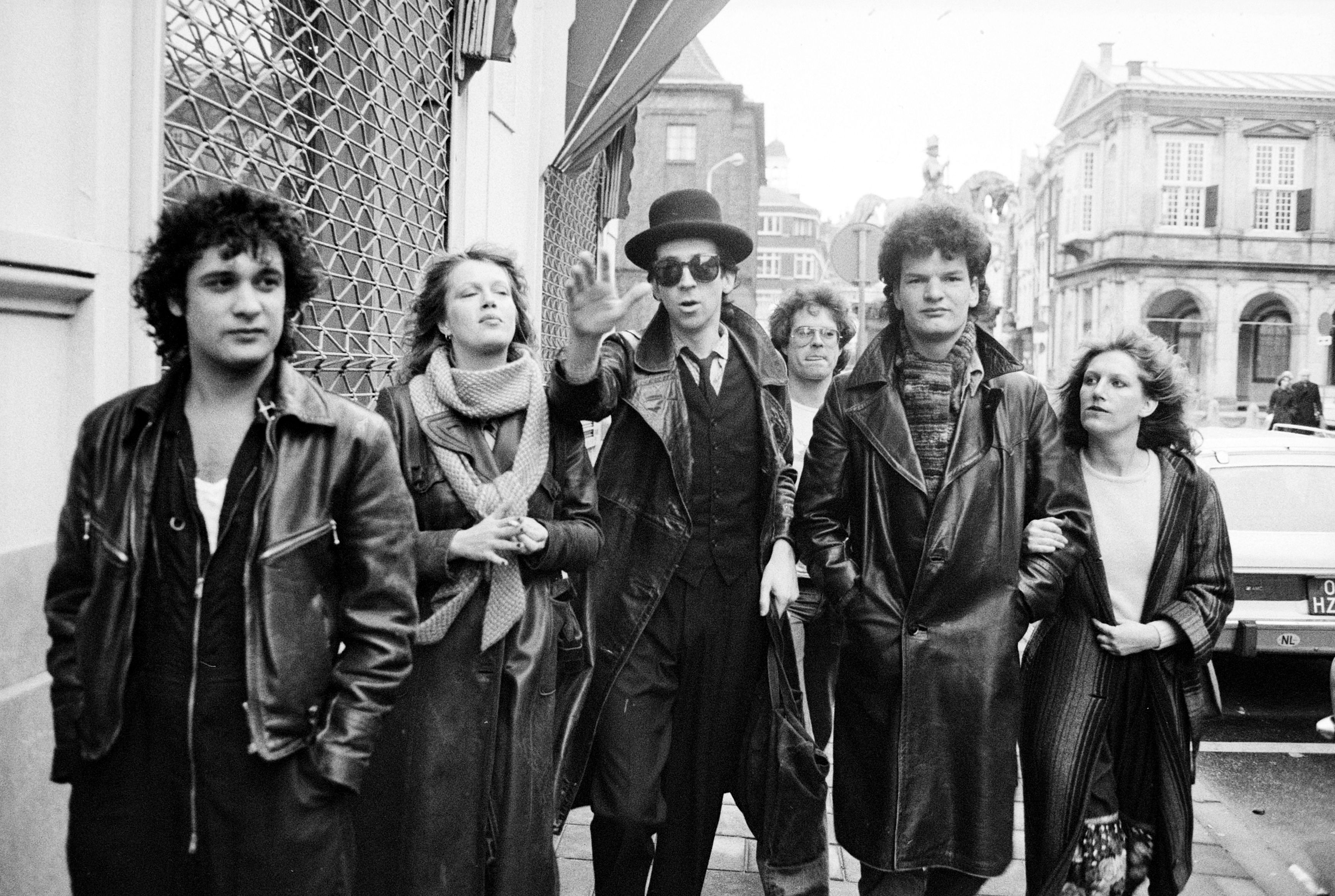
Gruppo Sportivo, 1978

Gruppo Sportivo are a Dutch pop band from The Hague, formed in 1976, who enjoyed a measure of international success in the late 1970s and 1980s. They had hit songs with "Hey Girl", "Beep Beep Love", "Tokyo (I'm On My Way)", "Disco Really Made It" and "Rock 'n' Roll". The frontman and writer of the material is Hans Vandenburg. The band went on hiatus in 2013. Early 2018 a reunion was announced consisting of a tour and a new album called Great, which was released to critical acclaim in April 2018. In 2022 the band returned with their 25+ city The Spotify Tour, in which they performed their 25 most streamed songs in reverse order.

== Beginnings ==
The band formed in the 1970s, and rode to national popularity playing new wave music. The creative force was Hans Vandenburg (guitar and vocals), with Max Mollinger (drums), Peter Calicher (keyboards), Eric Wehrmeyer (bass), and the "Gruppettes" Josée van Iersel and Meike Touw (vocals). The band played pop songs whose lyrics contained humor, situational comedy, and inside musical jokes.

== 10 Mistakes & Back To 78 ==
Their first single was "Out There In The Jungle" (Polydor 1976), but the height of their career came with the two albums 10 Mistakes (1977) and Back to 78 (1978). They came to popularity just after the height of punk rock, but were regarded as more post-punk, veering more towards the mainstream pop. "Dreamin'", a song from the album 10 Mistakes received some college radio airplay in the US. They were admired for their live performances, which had great humor and slapstick. Their best known song is "Beep Beep Love" (from the album 10 Mistakes), which enjoyed some success both in the UK and US. The UK's Radio & Records voted them "Top Newcomer '78".

The albums were produced by Robert Jan Stips (Supersister, Golden Earring, The Nits). After releasing the single "Sleeping Bag" Hans Vandenburg disbanded Gruppo Sportivo at the height of their popularity. He got the band back together for Copy Copy in 1980, after the release of his solo debut album Buddy Odor Is a Gas (1979). Only Calicher and Mollinger remained from the original line-up.

== From Copy Copy to Sing Sing ==
From 1980 to 1984 the band released the albums Copy Copy (1980, with Bette Bright of Deaf School on vocals), Pop! Goes the Brain (1981) and Designe Moderne (1982), which brought a shift of success to mainly Germany, Italy and Spain. "Happily Unemployed" (1982) became a radio hit in Germany. In the mid 80's "Rhythmisaconstantbeat" (1981) was used in a radioshow called Supergarcía on Antena3 in Spain. It was hosted by journalist José María García who was very popular at the time.

Sombrero Times followed in 1984 and was the band's first album released by an independent label. It featured the singles "Two Tickets To Rio" and "Radar". After splitting up for a couple of years, the band returned with compilation album Back to 19 Mistakes in 1988, which was preceded by their popular Wall of Voodoo cover single "Mexican Radio". It was followed by Sucker of the Century (1989), Young & Out (1992, featuring radio hit "She Was Pretty," "Repeatlemania" and new jazzy version of "Hey Girl") and the semi-acoustic live album Sing Sing (1993).

Sing Sing included new versions of hits (a.o. "Disco Really Made It," "Mission à Paris" and "Beep Beep Love"), album tracks (including "Repeatlemania", "Shave" and "Hollywood") and new songs (including "I Would Dance"). The band toured Europe with the Bombita's (Lies Schilp and Inge Bonthond) on vocals.

After Sing Sing Hans Vandenburg released his solo albums Commercial Break (1994, including the rocker "This Day Is Fine," which was accompanied by a video directed by Theo van Gogh) and "Shake Hands with Vandenburg" (1996). These albums were followed by Uit het Leven Gegrepen (1998), the debut album by his new band Dierenpark, the first album Vandenburg wrote in Dutch.

== Topless 16, Rock Now Roll Later & The Secret of Success ==
After releasing Married with Singles in 2000, a compilation album with all the singles and b-sides from 1976 to 1988 (plus two new songs "Click Here" and "I Don't Think So"), the original band re-united for a handful of dates, including a high-profile show at Sail 2000, which was broadcast on TV.

In 2004 the band released the album Topless 16 featuring 16 new songs, including the single and video "Superman Is Back," referencing both the iconic movie hero and their own classic 10 Mistakes song "Superman." The album - their first with new songs only since Young & Out in 1991 - featured Gert Jan Konink on bass. Other songs and live favourites included "Ray of Light," "Your Words Are Free" and "Non Stop Girl." The band filmed a video for "I Worry Everyday", which was released on YouTube in 2022.

It was followed in 2006 by Rock Now, Roll Later a compilation album featuring the band's singles from 1989 to 1996. It included two new songs: live favourite "DoReMiFaSoLaTiDo" and "Green Utopia Bay," one of their best songs ever, according to Vandenburg.

In July 2006, the Japanese girl band, Puffy AmiYumi, recorded a new version of "Tokyo," originally recorded by Gruppo Sportivo in 1978.

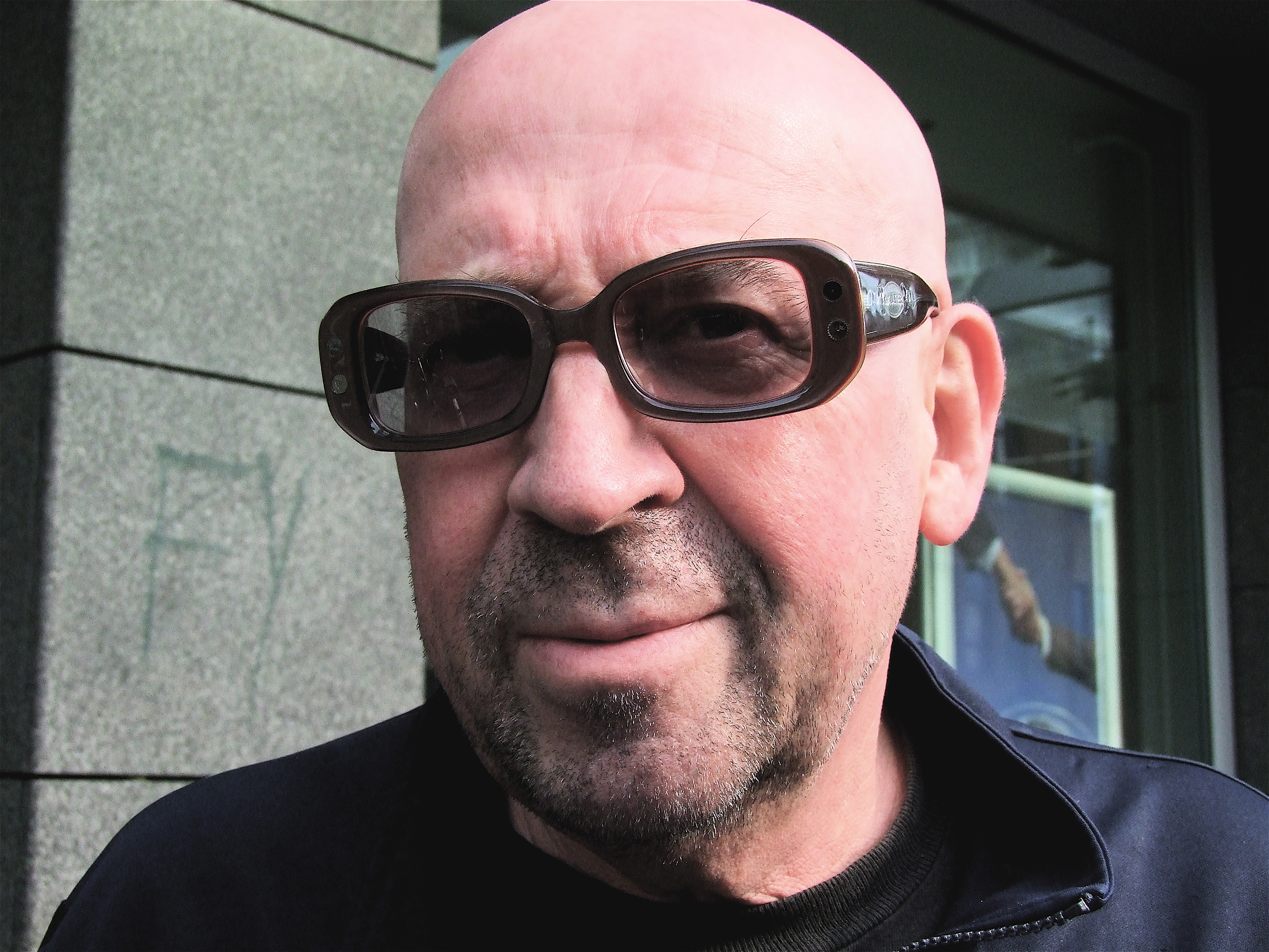
Hans Vandenburg, 2008

In late 2010 the biography "Hans Vandenburg en Het Geheim van Succes" about Hans Vandenburg by Bindervoet and Henkes was published. It contained a bonus CD with outtakes, demos and other unreleased songs called Here Funny Album Title.

To mark their 35th anniversary the band recorded the acoustic album The Secret of Success (2011), featuring new versions of songs from all over their career. From "Henri" to "Hey Girl" and from "James Last Car" to new song "Pop Eyes". The album was accompanied by an extensive theatre tour, which starred Hans Vandenburg biography writers Bindervoet and Henkes as part of the first set. Looking back on the album on their official Facebook page in June 2015, the band stated that they considered "My Uncle Ben's Picture Book" from the album a highlight.

== 10 Mistakes re-release & farewell tour ==
In 2012 – 35 years after the original release – the band re-released their debut album 10 Mistakes, with five additional songs. A theatre and club tour followed in 2012-2013. During the shows the complete album was performed, combined with other Gruppo Sportivo classics and cover songs that inspired 10 Mistakes. On December 28, 2013, the band performed its last show at The Patronaat in Haarlem, Holland.

== Dig It Yourself and Back to 78 re-release ==
In 2014 Gruppo Sportivo went hiatus ('studio only band' according to Vandenburg). In June 2015 Vandenburg (aka Van DeFruits) released his solo album Dig It Yourself, which included "Gimme Your Love," "Grow Grow Grow," Nine Inch Nails re-make "Various Methods of Escape" and "Groovin'," a song he originally wrote with the late Dutch singer Herman Brood in the 1980s. It was released on green vinyl (along with the bonus download album OK iPad featuring 9 songs for kids) and is also available digitally (iTunes, Spotify, Deezer a.o.). After very positive reviews in OOR Magazine, NRC and Parool (among others) and a short acoustic tour the album entered the Dutch Vinyl Top 50 at #8. Radio 2 DJ Hans Schiffers declared Dig It Yourself 'Album of the Week'.

In May 2016 Vandenburg released the cassette Zijn 20 Mooiste Demos, containing 20 demo recordings including "Mr. Smile," "Find the Summer" and "Hooked." Dutch newspaper, Algemeen Dagblad, interviewed him about the project and his choice to release it on cassette. A limited number of cassettes is sold via Vandenburg's online shop.

September 2016 saw the re-release of Gruppo's classic and best-selling album Back to 78 on vinyl. The release includes downloadable live versions of never before released songs from 1978. A year later 1989 EP Sucker Of The Century - recorded with Robert Jan Stips and others - was released on digital platforms such as Spotify and iTunes.

== The Golden Years Of Dutch Pop Music and return with Great ==
While the band posted pictures from an apparent recording session for a new album a new compilation album was released: The Golden Years Of Dutch Pop Music - Gruppo Sportivo. The 2-CD album consists of A and B side singles covering 1976 ("Out There In The Jungle") to 1991 ("She Was Pretty"). The album entered the Dutch Album Top 100 at #85.

Early 2018 a reunion tour was announced with a new album - titled Great - planned for late April 2018. On April 6 new single "(This Is a) Normal Song" - a re-make of the song that was added to the re-release of Ten Mistakes as a bonus track - was released. Spotify selected it for their New Alternative playlist. "Tub For Two" and "Oh Caroline" - both live favourites from 1982/1983, but never recorded - were finally put to tape for Great.

On April 20 new album Great was released to very positive reviews in Algemeen Dagblad, OOR magazine, Musicmaker, Noordhollands Dagblad and Writteninmusic among others. Highlights mentioned were "Cruisin'," "Normal Song," "Oh Caroline," "Cockroach" and the Hans Vandenburg's most personal song to date called "Over The Hill."

Great entered the Dutch Album Top 100 at #46, the band's first chart entry with an album of new original songs since Copy Copy in 1980. It entered the Album Top 40 the week after on the back of more raving reviews in OOR ('Great is Gruppo's best album since Back To 78'), Telegraaf and others.

To celebrate the release of Great classic albums Back To 78, Copy Copy, Pop! Goes The Brain, Design Moderne and the Hans Vandenburg/Gruppo Sportivo-project Buddy Odor is a Gas! (by The Buddy Odor Stop, featuring the still occasionally performed "Cats Hiss") were finally released digitally on Spotify, Deezer and iTunes/Apple Music, followed in June by Sombrero Times, Young & Out and live album Sing Sing.

The Great tour, during which the whole of the new album was performed plus a selection of favourites from both audience and band, was met with critical acclaim as well.

On Friday July 13 the band released the second single from the Great album, "Cruisin'." It was released as a single mix plus two remixes by DJ Mark van Dale were released.

== What Else Can I Do? & Posthumourly ==
Early August, 2018, Spotify released its official This is Gruppo Sportivo playlist, featuring 45 tracks from Ten Mistakes (1977) all the way to Great (2018) and everything in between. On November 17 the vinyl version of Great was released, with a new tracklisting, including two new songs: "What Else Can I Do?" and "Moments Like This."

On April 5, 2019, Gruppo Sportivo released "What Else Can I Do" as a single, accompanied by the band's first new music video in 13 years. It was featured in several popular playlists on Spotify including New Music Friday and New Alternative. In the same month the band kicked off the GREAT Tour 2019 in Drachten. The tour included a high profile show at Parkpop Saturday Night before it wrapped up in Zoetermeer in July.

During the Covid-19 lockdown in 2020 they wrote and recorded a song in celebration of 40 years of Parkpop called "Smartphonesong," since it was entirely recorded on smartphones. Due to popular demand it was rush-released on all digital platforms.

On July 17, Hans Vandenburg released his solo album Posthumourly, featuring the single '"Mr. Smile," "I Don't Know" and "When You Grow Old" and others. He also featured solo versions of Gruppo Sportivo songs "Find The Summer" and "Told You So," and a mellow version of his 1994 Commercial Break song "This Day Is Fine."

On December 18, 2020 the band released the single and video "Rudolph Het Rendier," a Dutch-language Christmas version of the 1979 The Buddy Odor Stop / Gruppo Sportivo song "Cats Hiss." Spotify included the single in its popular New Music Friday playlist.

In 2021 Hans Vandenburg released four albums on streaming platforms: Dierenpark's Riep Kwaad Neushorn, his solo album Shake Hands With Vandenburg from 1996, follow-up Shake Hands With Vandenburg Again - featuring his projects with The Wishing Well, De Bloedverdunners and The Downloadables - and his children's album OK iPad, featuring a re-working in Dutch of Gruppo Sportivo classic The Bottom Of The Class from Back To 78.

== The 2022-2024: The Spotify Tours, Rock City & Back To Nature ==
In July 2021 the band announced the Spotify Tour 2022. During the tour, Gruppo Sportivo played their 25 most streamed songs in reverse order. The tour started on March 18, 2022 in Almere.

The band also shared photos from the studio together with producer Robert Jan Stips, who also produced Ten Mistakes, Back To 78 and Pop! Goes The Brain amongst others. Together they were working on a single called Rock City, which was released on September 9, 2022.

On March 8, 2023, Gruppo Sportivo released a new version of the song Strange Brew as a single to celebrate the start of their 2023 Spotify Tour Refreshed, along with Rock City's Serious Remix on the occasion of the cinema premiere of the documentary Rock City: The Life We Live. “Our songs are now often discovered via Spotify,” says singer and songwriter Hans Vandenburg. “I used to discover new music through the radio. Now I do that mainly through Spotify. That is precisely why we like to celebrate the start of The Spotify 2023 Tour with a song about the radio. An ode actually, because that's what Strange Brew is”.

During the Spotify Tour Refreshed 2023, the band was accompanied by Wouter Kiers on saxophone as a special guest. Venues the band hadn't played for a long time - including 't Paard in The Hague, Paradiso in Amsterdam and Luxor Live in Arnhem - were packed.

On August 17, 2023 Hans Vandenburg released a "Happy Birthday Mix" of his 2008 song "The Pineapple Shake", which was previously only available on Here Funny Album Title, the companion album to Bindervoet and Henkes' biography Het Geheim van Succes about Vandenburg.

On October 13, a week before the wrap-up of The Spotify Tour Refreshed in a sold-out TivoliVredenburg in Utrecht, the song P.S. I Love You was released, with second track Smartphone Surf, an instrumental re-make of the lockdown single Smartphonesong.

Gruppo Sportivo started a new tour through the Netherlands and Belgium on March 2, 2024, named Let's Age On Stage. The day before, a re-make of debut single Out There In The Jungle was released as Out There In The Jungle (Again), with a contribution from rapper Master Surreal. It was the opener of mini-album Back To Nature, which was released digitally on April 5, 2024, but already available from March 2 on the tour. Hans Vandenburg about the album: “On our new mini album Back To Nature we return to our roots. That's the theme that connects the six songs. We have re-recorded our very first single 'Out There In The Jungle', making it an exciting mix of a late 70s and 2024 vibes. 'Strange Brew' is about the early days of the radio when we first started, and 'Rock City' is an ode to our hometown The Hague, our Rock City. This is how we go full circle.”

On April 1, 2024, longtime keyboard player Peter Calicher died after a short illness. A statement on the band's Facebook page said: After a short illness, our dear friend and keyboard player Peter 'Superman' Calicher passed away on the morning of April 1. We have experienced so much together. Played, created and laughed a lot. Your wish was to continue playing as long as possible and we will do that with you in mind. Rest in peace buddy, we will never forget you.

On April 5, the band celebrated the life of Peter Calicher in De Boerderij in Zoetermeer, where the already planned album release party of the 6-track album Back to Nature took place with (at that time) the 12 year old new keyboard player Len de Quant, son of the band's sound engineer Toon de Quant and pupil of Calicher. Len went to elementary when his father started bringing him to Gruppo Sportivo shows. At first he helped with roadie tasks while getting music lessons from Peter Calicher and teaching himself to play Gruppo Sportivo songs. When Calicher became ill, he was able to replace him during shows. After Calicher's death, the band first tried playing with a professional musician since they felt Len was too young, but eventually he turned out to be the best replacement for Peter and the decision was made to continue with him as the band's new keyboards player.

On May 12, NPO Plus broadcast the documentary Gruppo Sportivo: Too Late To Stop Now (Het Is Nu Te Laat Om Te Stoppen). AVROTROS's crew followed the band in 2023 during the Spotify Tour Refreshed and the making of Back To Nature to 'explore the past, present and unique ways of Gruppo Sportivo'. The broadcast was followed by the 65 minute live special Gruppo Sportivo - That's Live, featuring footage from the 2023 Paradiso Amsterdam en Paard Den Haag shows.

== Back To Nature Tour 2025 & Back To Nature, Volume II ==
On November 1, 2024 the band announced the 2025 Back To Nature and plans to perform semi-acoustic version of songs from all over their career. The announcement was celebrated with the release of the new song Flowerbed.

The tour kicked off on April 4, 2025 in Amstelveen. On the same day, mini-album Back To Nature, Volume II was released, which includes "Fellow Travelers", "Girls Can't Leave Me" and the single "Bad Luck" a.o.[16]

The setlist featured songs from all over the band's career, including rarely played songs like "Moments Like This", "It Feels So Good" (The Buddy Odor Stop) and "Top 40 City".

In October the Belgian series The Big F-Up premiered on Streamz.be (BE) and Amazon Prime (NL), featuring the band's "P.S. 78" in the second episode.

== The 50th Anniversary Tour, Talkshow EP, biography Typisch Sportivo and Vinyl3 ==
In November 2025, it was announced that in 2026, the band's 50th anniversary year, Gruppo Sportivo would be touring pop venues and festivals with a final tour: Stop Motion - The 50th Anniversary Tour.

To celebrate "Hey Girl"'s entry into the NPO Radio 2 Top 2000, Gruppo Sportivo released the song's first ever official video on December 24. Vandenburg: "The idea for a video for 'Hey Girl' had been brewing for a while, and its entry into the Top 2000 gave it the final push. With this cheerful clip, Gruppo Sportivo is completely up-to-date!"

On April 3, 2026, the single and video Talkshow were released as a teaser for the vinyl EP of the same name, which, in addition to the title track, includes the George Kooymans tribute That Day, among others.

On April 10, 2026, the biography Typisch Sportivo by Leo Oldenburger was presented at P60, Amstelveen. According to OOR (music magazine), it is a "beautiful monument to fifty years of Dutch pop".

On September 18 Gruppo Sportivo released compilation album Vinyl3! (Selected Recordings 1992-2026), a companion piece to double album Vinylly (Selected Recordings 1989–1992). It was preceded by a 2026 live version of 1992 song Big Star Vampire.

== Personnel ==
Current members

- Hans Vandenburg – guitar, vocals (1976–1979, 1980–present)
- Max Mollinger – drums, vocals (1976–1979, 1980–1985, 2000-present)
- Tim Barning – bass (2017–present)
- Len de Quant – keyboards, vocals (2024–present)
- Inge Bonthond – vocals (1991–present)
- Lies Schilp – vocals (1980–present)

Former members

- Peter Calicher – keyboards, vocals (1976–1979, 1980–2024)
- Eric Wehrmeyer – bass (1976–1979)
- Martin Bakker - bass (1980–1981)
- Dicky Schulte Nordholt - bass (1982–1989)
- Kim Haworth - drums (1988–1991)
- Mighty Mike - drums (1991–1994)
- Josee van Iersel – vocals (1976–1978; reunion – 2000)
- Meike Touw – vocals (1976–1979; reunion – 2000)
- Lisa Bialac-vocals (1978-1979)
- GJ Konink – bass (2000–2010)
- Joris Lutz – bass (2010–2013)

== Discography ==
=== Gruppo Sportivo ===
- Rare Tracks - Polydor (1976/77)
- 10 Mistakes - Ariola (1977)
- Back to 78 - Ariola (1978)
- Mistakes - Sire (1979)
- More Mistakes (7") - Sire (1979)
- Buddy Odor Is a Gas - Pye (1979)
- Copy Copy - Ariola (1980)
- Pop! Goes the Brain - Ariola (1981)
- Design Moderne - Ariola (1982)
- Sombrero Times - Ariola (1984)
- Back to 19 Mistakes - BMG/Ariola (1988)
- Sucker of the Century - JAWS Records (1989)
- Young and Out - Dutch VAN [2 CD Box] (1992)
- Sing Sing (Live) - Dutch VAN (1993)
- Second Life (US Sing Sing release) - Amsterdamned Records (1997)
- Married with Singles - Pseudonym Records (2000)
- Topless 16 - Pias (2004)
- DVD Career Movies (2006)
- Rock Now, Roll Later! - Pias [2CD](2007)
- The Secret of Success - T2 Entertainment (2011)
- The Golden Years Of Dutch Pop Music - Gruppo Sportivo - Sony/Universal (2017)
- Great - Redline Music (2018)
- Vinylly - Selected Recordings 1978-1991 (Vinyl only - Record Store Day release) - Sony Music/Music On Vinyl (2019)
- Back To Nature (mini-album) - My First Step records (2024)
- Back To Nature, Volume II (mini-album) - My First Step records (2025)
- Talkshow (EP) - My First Step records (2026)
- Vinyl3!- Selected Recordings 1992-2026 (Vinyl only) - Music On Vinyl (2026)

=== Hans Vandenburg ===
- Buddy Odor Is a Gas - Pye (1979)
- Hans Vandenburg's Commercial Break - VAN Records (1994)
- Shake Hands with Vandenburg - VAN Records (1996)
- Ouwe Hans Dierenpark - Uit het Leven Gegrepen - VAN Records (1998)
- Dierenpark - Sliptong - Suburban (2002)
- Dierenpark - Tot Ziens, Bedankt, Het Beste van Dierenpark Live! - My First Step Records (2006)
- Hans Vandenburg - Dig It Yourself - My First Step/Suburban Records (2015)
- Hans Vandenburg - Zijn 20 Mooiste Demo's - My First Step Records (Cassette, 2016)
- De Bloedverdunners - Ah Oh Wee- My First Step Records (USB stick, 2017)
- Posthumourly - Suburban/My First Step Records (Vinyl, digital, 2020)
- Dierenpark - Riep Kwaad Neushorn - My First Step Records (2021)
- Shake Hands With Vandenburg Again - My First Step Records (2021)
- OK iPad (children's music) - My First Step Records (2021)
