= Voice 2: Cover Lovers Rock =

VOICE 2 ～cover lovers rock～

Studio album by Tomiko Van
- Released: March 5, 2008
- Recorded: 2008
- Genre: J-pop
- Label: Avex Trax

Tomiko Van chronology
Voice: Cover You With Love (2007)	VOICE 2 ～cover lovers rock～ (2008)	Van. (2008)

CD + DVD cover

Voice 2: Cover Lovers Rock is the second cover album by the J-pop singer Tomiko Van.

== Track listing ==
1. "Cherry" (チェリー) (Spitz)
2. "Boku wa Koko ni Iru" (僕はここにいる, I'm Here) (Masayoshi Yamazaki)
3. "You're the Only・・" (Masatoshi Ono)
4. "Sakura (Dokushou)" (さくら(独唱)) (Naotaro Moriyama)
5. "It's Only Love" (Masaharu Fukuyama)
6. "Tōku Tōku" (遠く遠く, Far Away Far Away) (Noriyuki Makihara)
7. "Oh My Little Girl" (Yutaka Ozaki)
8. "Seishun no Kage" (青春の影, Shadow of Youth) (Tulip)
9. "Zoo" (Kaori Kawamura)
10. "Aisubeki Hito yo" (愛すべきひとよ, A Lovable Person) (The Kaleidoscope)
11. "Oh, Pretty Woman" (Roy Orbison)

== Chart positions ==
Chart	Peak position	Sales
Oricon Weekly Chart	28	7,979
