= Yumeji (song) =

Single by Tomiko Van

from the album Van.
- Released: November 29, 2006
- Genre: Pop rock
- Label: Avex Trax
- Songwriter(s): Tomiko Van

Tomiko Van singles chronology
"Senkō" (2006)	"Yumeji" (2006)	"Tokyo Biyori" (2006)

Yumeji
- CD+DVD cover

"Yumeji" is a pop-rock ballad by Japanese singer Tomiko Van. It is Van's third single that released on November 29, 2006. The cover jackets for the single were shot in a countryside not faraway from the city of Tokyo, and Van expressed that the covers would perfectly match the song. In the PV for the title track "Yumeji", Van follows a light through dark streets and finds a flower garden in the middle of trash. The single's B-side is entitled "Labyrinth" and is as "Yumeji" a lyric work of Van.

An acoustic version of Yumeji was included on her first album, Voice: Cover You With Love, as a bonus track.

== Track listing ==
=== CD Portion ===
1. "Yumeji" (夢路, Dream Road)
2. "Labyrinth"
3. "Yumeji" -instrumental- (夢路, Dream Road)
4. "Labyrinth" -instrumental-

=== DVD Portion ===
CD

1. "Yumeji" (夢路, Dream Road)
2. "Labyrinth"
3. "Yumeji" -instrumental- (夢路, Dream Road)
4. "Labyrinth" -instrumental-

DVD

1. "Yumeji" (夢路, Dream Road) Music Clips

== Charts ==
Release	Chart	Peak position	First week sales	Sales total
November 29, 2006	Oricon Daily Singles Chart	10		
November 29, 2006	Oricon Weekly Singles Chart	14	8,202	9,646
