= Westernieland =

- Village
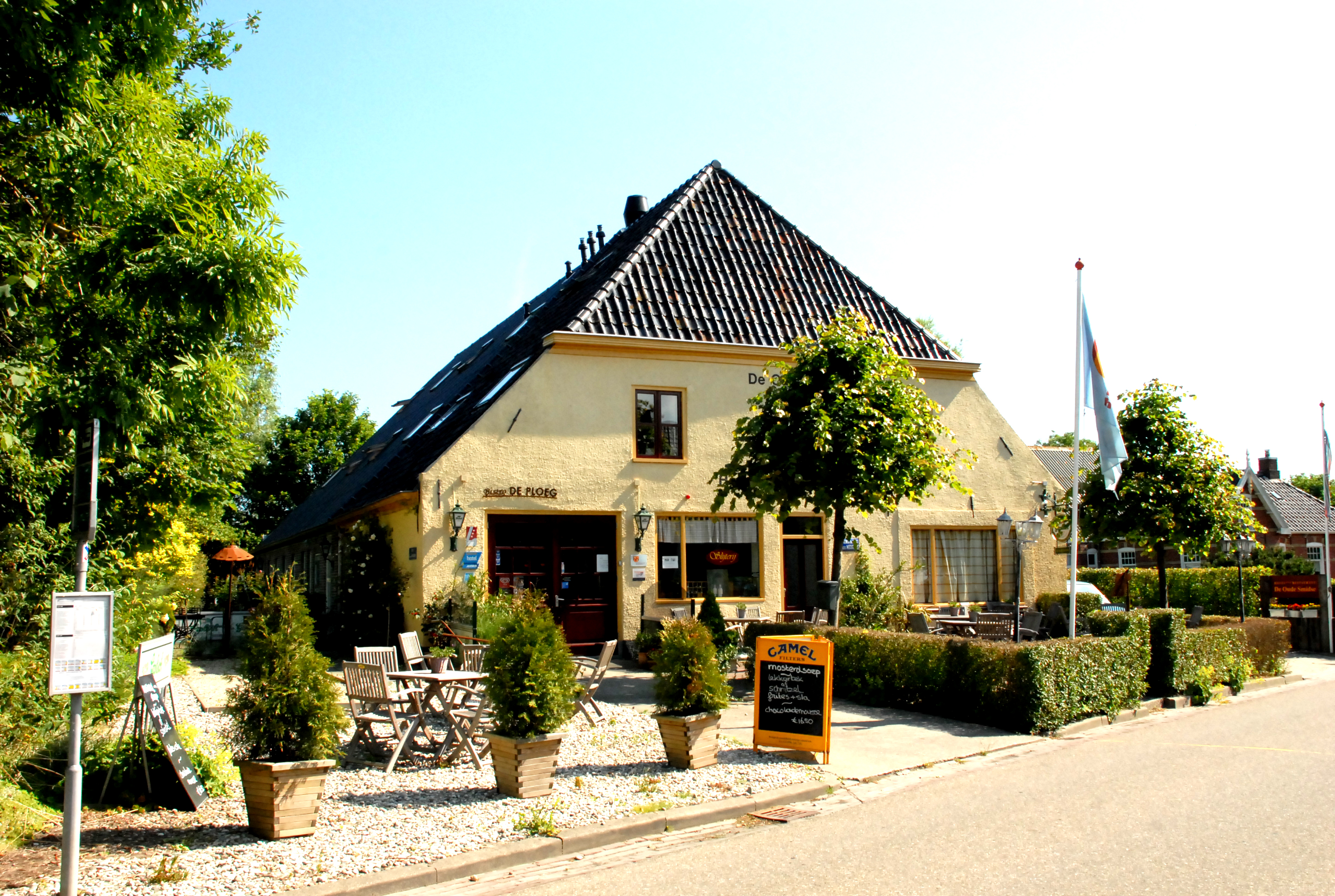
- De Oude Smidse in Westernieland

- Location in province of Groningen in the Netherlands Westernieland (Netherlands)
- Coordinates: 53.4002°N 6.4808°E
- Country: Netherlands
- Province: Groningen
- Municipality: Het Hogeland

Area
  - Total: 0.88 km^{2} (0.34 sq mi)
- Elevation: 1 m (3.3 ft)

Population (2021)
  - Total: 230
  - Density: 260/km^{2} (680/sq mi)
- Time zone: UTC+1 (CET)
  - Summer (DST): UTC+2 (CEST)
- Postal code: 9969
- Dialing code: 0595

Westernieland (Gronings: Westernijland) is a village in the Dutch province of Groningen. It is part of the municipality of Het Hogeland. The village is located near the Wadden Sea.

== History ==
Around 1000, the village of Mariaburen was founded on a sand ridge near the Wadden Sea. Westernieland was sometimes referred to as Mariaburen in den Nijenlanden (Mariaburen in the new lands), however it is unclear whether it is the same village. Around 1350, a dike was built. The village was first mentioned in 1406 as Inden Nyen Lande (in the new land). Later "west" was added to distinguish itself from Oosternieland to the east. The church contains 14th century parts, however the main construction is from 1831.

Due to the proximity to the Wadden Sea, the village was flooded several times. The worst flood was the Christmas Flood of 1717 when only four of the 50 houses were still habitable, and 78 people died. The church remained standing, but contained two metres of water. Westernieland was rebuilt on higher ground which explains the detached location of the church. In 1795, it became part of the municipality of Pieterburen. In 1840, the population was 500 people.

Even though Pieterburen, the main village, is nowadays known for the Seal Rehabilitation and Research Centre, the economy was partially based on seal clubbing. The last sealer in the Netherlands was Ko Teerling from Westernieland. During his best season, he had killed 600 seals. Later limits were imposed, and it was declared illegal in 1957.

In 1939, an unemployed camp was constructed near the village for a poldering project. From 1945 to 1947, it served as an internment camp for members of the NSB (Dutch Nazi party). Up to the 1970s, Westernieland was a lively community with shops. Since then, it has lost its retail and the school has closed down. In 2019, it became part of the municipality of Het Hogeland.

Westernieland is one of the starting points for wadlopen (mudflat hiking). At low tide, it is possible to walk to the island of Schiermonnikoog. Mudflat hiking is potentially dangerous, and is only allowed under the supervision of a licensed guide.

== Notable people ==
- Freek de Jonge (born 1944), cabaret performer and writer

== Gallery ==
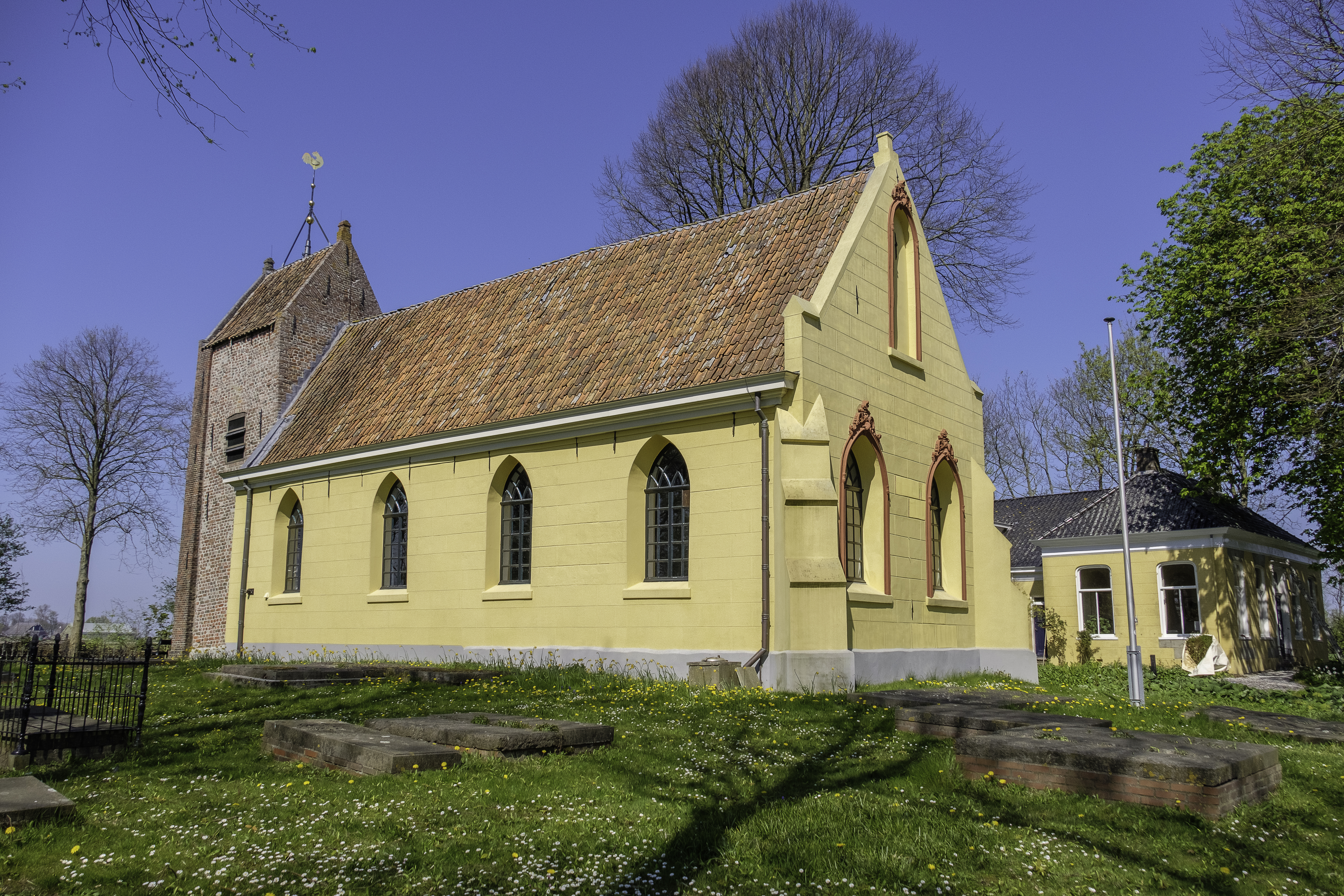
Church of Westernieland

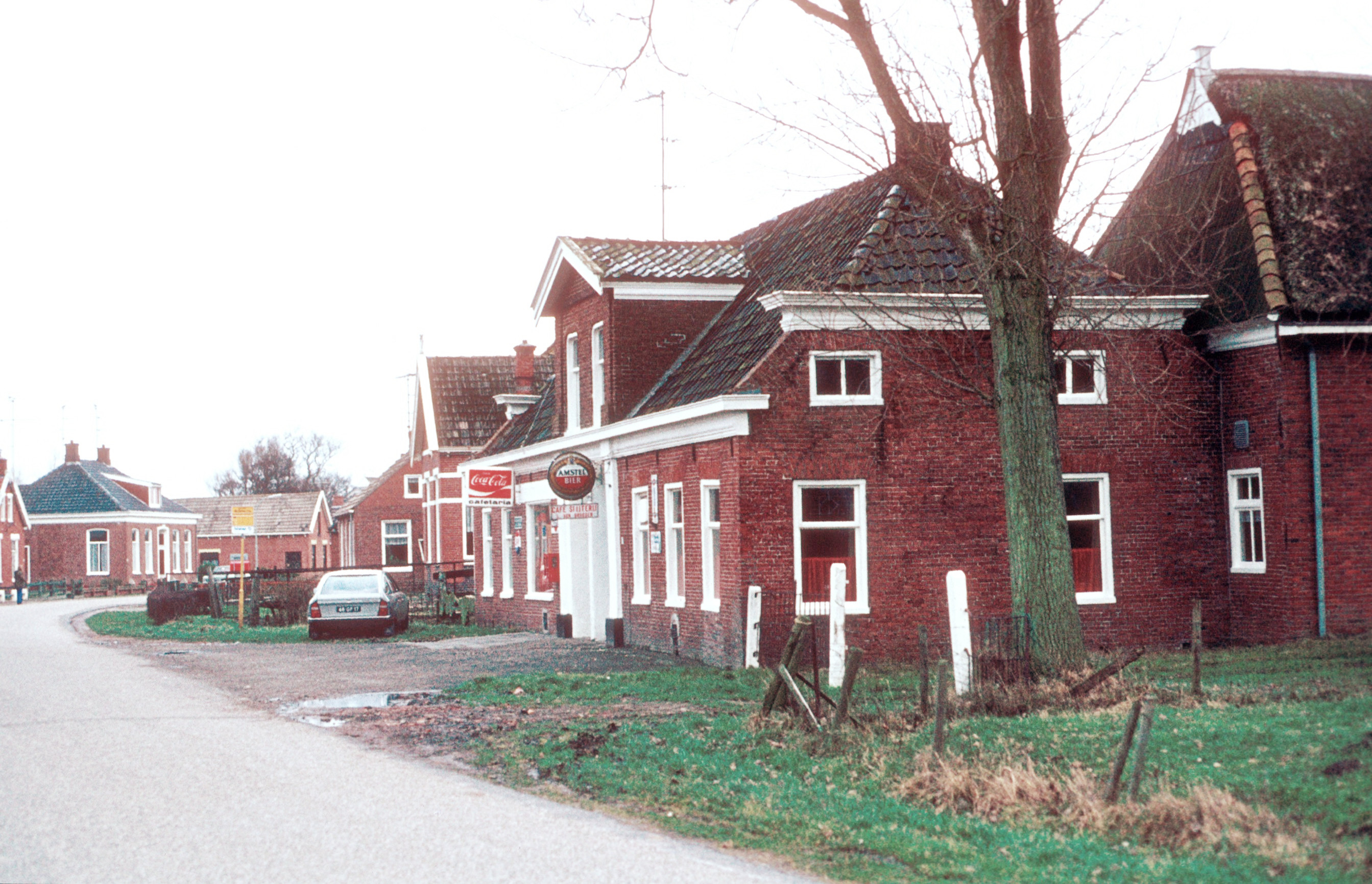
Bar in Westernieland

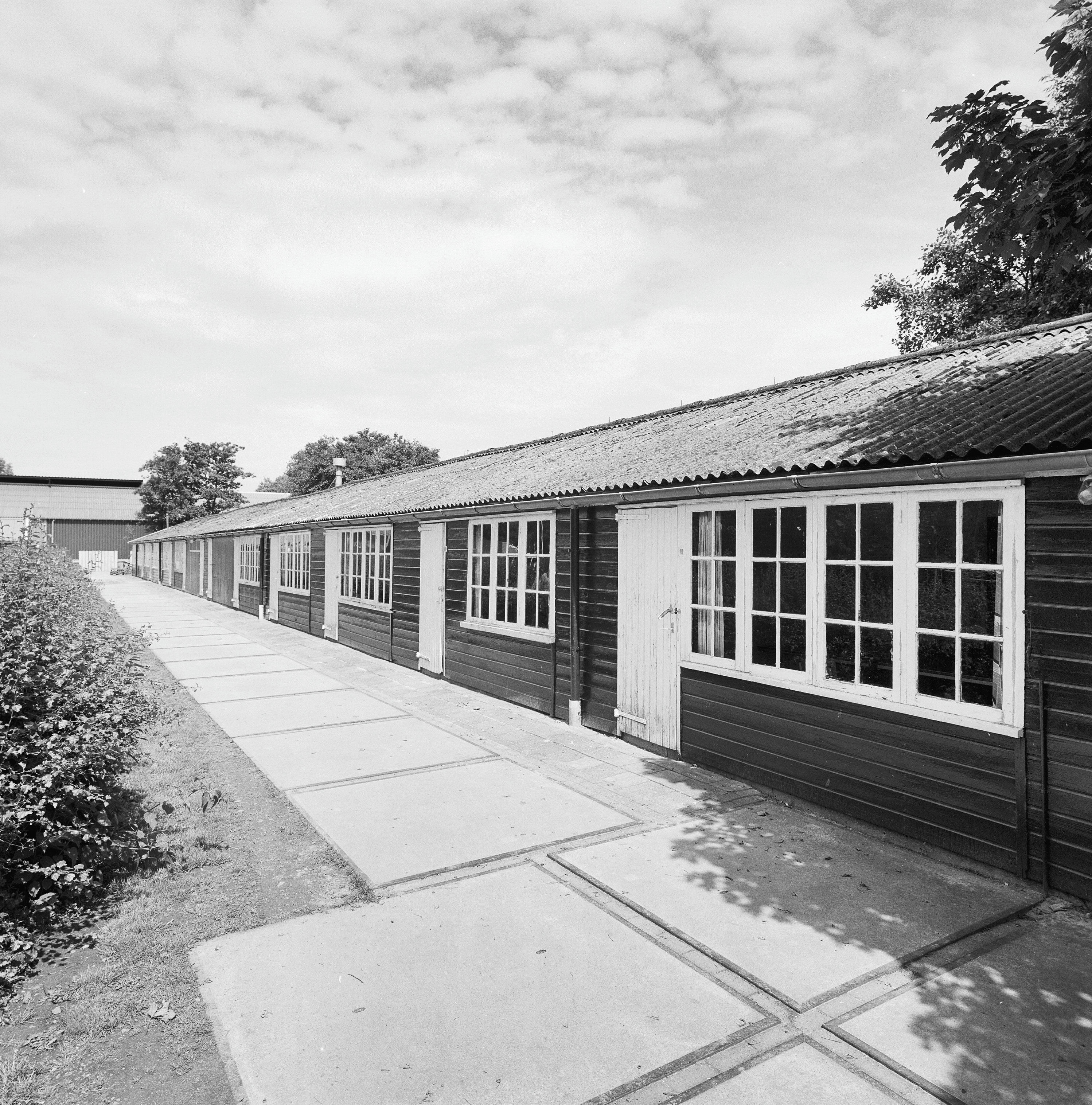
The barracks of the unemployed camp

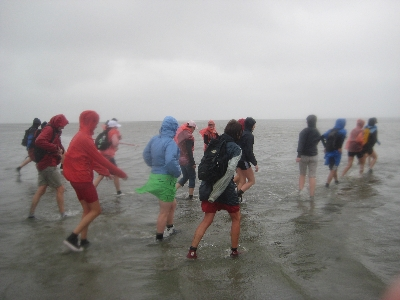
Mudflat hiking near Westernieland
