= Farewell (Tomiko Van album) =

Studio album by Tomiko Van
- Released: March 29, 2006
- Recorded: 2005, 2006
- Genre: J-pop, Jazz
- Length: 50:43
- Label: Avex Trax
- Producer: Ryuhei Chiba & Masato "max" Matsuura

Tomiko Van chronology
Farewell (2006)	Voice: Cover You With Love (2007)

Farewell CD edition

Farewell is Tomiko Van's first original studio album under the Avex Trax label. The album was released on March 29, 2006.

== Information ==
Farewell is the debut album by Japanese singer Tomiko Van as a solo artist. It was released in Japan as both CD and CD+DVD versions, with drastic differences on the covers between the two of them. This album is the first production released by Van after the disband of Do As Infinity.

For unclear reasons, the album did not have promotional singles before its release for helping sales. A few of the songs on the album have already appeared on various soundtracks, which might have been one of the reasons they cut straight into the release of the debut album. Only airplay of two of the music videos made for promotion, the jazz tune "Hold Me..." and ballad "Farewell". Both promotional videos were included on the DVD from the CD+DVD version of the album.

With this album, Van gave a totally different step on her music, really different compared to old works with band Do As Infinity; all the songs from this album are mainly ballads or soft tunes, with some guitars included in some of the tracks. Also, Van got more into jazz in some of the songs. A cover of the theme song from the Disney animated film Cinderella, "A Dream is a Wish Your Heart Makes," originally first included on the Japanese release of the special edition of the DVD OST release, was also included as a bonus track.

== Track listing ==
=== CD ===
1. "farewell" – 4:06
2. "morning glory" – 4:37
3. "Urara." (うらら。, Ooh La La.) – 4:03
4. "Essence" – 4:26
5. "horoscope" – 6:14
6. "complacence" – 4:09
7. "Nue no Naku Yoru" (鵺の鳴く夜, Night When the Nue Howled) – 3:59
8. "HOLY PLANET" – 5:13
9. "Before Sunset"" – 5:35
10. "Hold Me..." – 4:54
11. "A Dream is a Wish Your Heart Makes" (Bonus Track) – 3:19

=== DVD ===
1. "farewell"
2. "Hold Me..."

== Personnel ==
- Tomiko Van - vocals

== Production ==
- Art Direction & Design - Toshiaki Uchikoshi (King Cay Lab.)
- Photographer - Kaori Suzuki
- Stylist - Kyohei Ogawa
- Hair & Make-up - Hirokazu Niwa (maroon brand)

== Charts ==
Chart (2006)	Peak position	First week sales	Sales total
Oricon Daily Albums Chart	5		
Oricon Weekly Albums Chart	6	23,413	36,590+
Taiwan J-Pop Chart	6		
