= Freek de Jonge =

Dutch cabaret performer and writer (born 1944)

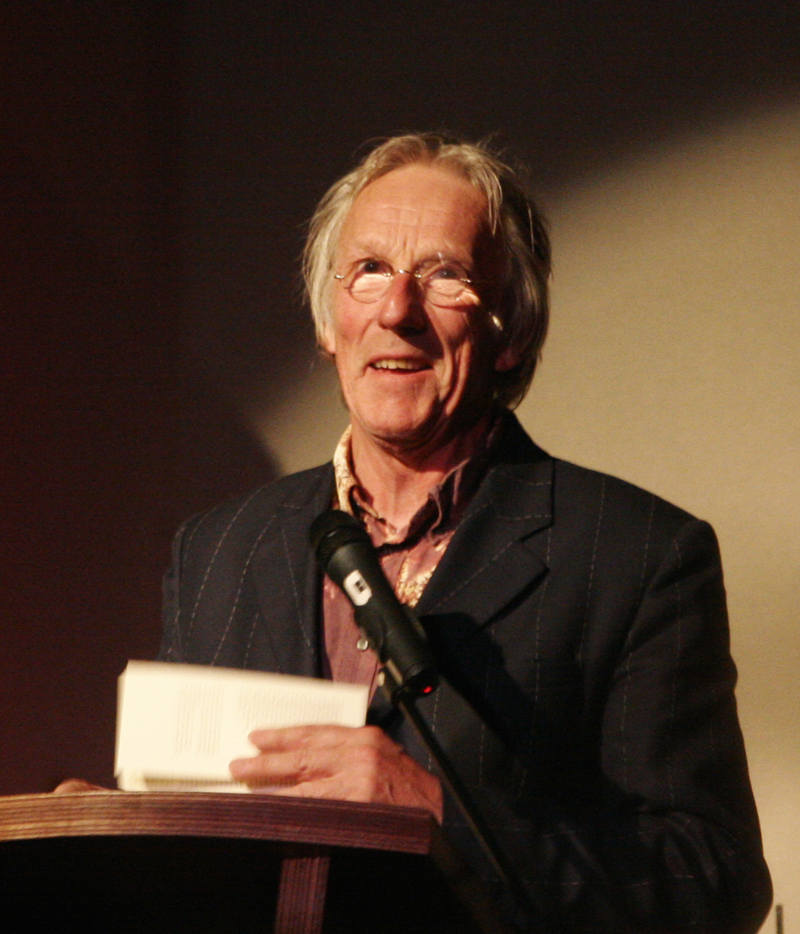
- De Jonge in 2010
- Born: Frederik Jan Georg de Jonge; 30 August 1944 (age 82); Westernieland, Netherlands
- Spouse: Hella Asser (m. 1971)

Comedy career
- Years active: 1955–present
- Medium: Television; radio
- Genre: Political satire
- Subjects: Politics; current events; life in general

Frederik "Freek" Jan Georg de Jonge (born 30 August 1944) is a Dutch cabaret performer and writer.

== Early life and education ==
De Jonge was born in Westernieland, the son of a pastor. His family moved to Workum, and later to Zaandam and Goes. At age 11, De Jonge had his first performance on stage. After barely making it through high school, he studied cultural anthropology in Amsterdam. During his studies he met Bram Vermeulen and Johan Gertenbach, and they formed a group of comedy performers, Neerlands Hoop In Bange Dagen.

== Career ==
In 1978, Neerlands Hoop became famous for their opposition against the participation of the Netherlands national football team in the football world cup in Argentina, through their show Bloed aan de Paal.

In 1979, Neerlands Hoop split up and De Jonge started a solo career of comedy performances. Starting in 1983, he also regularly performed on Dutch national television on New Year's Eve, humoristically looking back on the past year (the so-called "Oudejaarsconference").

=== Writer and musician ===
Besides performing in cabaret, De Jonge has written the novels Zaansch Veem (1987), Neerlands Bloed (1991) and Opa's Wijsvinger (1993). He has been the host of television shows and wrote two films: The Illusionist (1983) and De KKKomediant (1986). He also wrote a hip hop song with Dutch rapper Brainpower.

In 1994, De Jonge started to work with Nits. Under the name Frits, they performed covers of old Neerlands Hoop songs, translated Nits songs and newly written material. An album was released in 1995: Dankzij de Dijken. De Jonge continued to work with their keyboard player Robert Jan Stips: Stips released two albums: Gemeen Goed (1997) and Rapsodia (1998). A cover of Bob Dylan's "Death is not the End", titled "Leven Na De Dood", reached the first place of the Dutch charts in 1997.

=== 1997–present ===
From 1997 to October 2000, De Jonge was a columnist of the daily newspaper Parool.

In February 2004, he went to Iraq for a week to perform for the Dutch troops.

On 12 November 2005, he received the Groenman prize from the Genootschap Onze Taal; this is a society which works with the Dutch language.

== Personal life ==
De Jonge married to Hella Asser in 1971, daughter of Dutch writer Eli Asser.

== Awards ==
- Honorary medal from the municipality of Zaanstad (2020)
- Groninger of the Year (2017)
- Toon Hermans Award (2016)
- Association of Theater and Concert Hall Directors' Lifetime Achievement Award (2008)
- Groenman Language Prize (2005)

== Shows ==
=== With Neerlands Hoop ===
- Neerlands Hoop in Bange Dagen (1970)
- Live in Wadway (N.H.) (1971)
- Neerlands Hoop in Panama (1971)
- Plankenkoorts (1972)
- Weerzien in Panama (1973)
- Neerlands Hoop Express (1974)
- Ingenaaid of Gebonden (1975)
- Interieur (1977)
- Bloed aan de Paal (1978)
- Offsmboet Ippq Dpef (1979)

=== One man shows ===
- De Komiek (1980)
- De Tragiek (1981)
- De Mars (1982)
- De Openbaring (Oudejaarsconference) (1982)
- De Mythe (1983)
- Stroman en Trawanten (with Willem Breuker Kollektief) (1983)
- Een Verademing (Oudejaarsconference) (1984)
- De Bedevaart (1985)
- De Finale (Oudejaarsconference) (1985)
- Het Damestasje (1986)
- De Pretentie (1987)
- De Goeroe en de Dissident (1988)
- De Volgende (1989)
- De Ontlading (Oudejaarsconference) (1989)
- The One (1990) (English language)
- Losse Nummers (1992)
- De Estafette (Oudejaarsconference) (1992)
- De Tol (1994)
- Frits (with Nits) (1994-1995)
- Langzame Liedjes (with Stips) (1996)
- Het Luik (Oudejaarsconference) and De Brand (Nieuwjaarsconference) (1996)
- Gemeen Goed (with Stips) (1997)
- Rapsodia (with Stips) (1998)
- Papa Razzia (Oudejaarsconference) (1998)
- De Conferencier, het Boekenweekgeschenk en de Leugen (2000)
- De Gillende Keukenmeid (Oudejaarsconference) (2000)
- Het Laatste Oordeel (Oudejaarsconference) (2001)
- Parlando (with the Metropole Orkest) (2002)
- De Stemming (Verkiezingsconference) (2003)
- De Vergrijzing (2004)
- Cordon Sanitaire (2005)
- Freek Doet de Deur Dicht (2005)
- Wat is er nog Heilig? (2006)
- De Stemming 2006 (Verkiezingsconference) (2006)
- De Toeschouwer (2007)
- De Laatste Lach (2008)

== Books ==
- Zaansch Veem (1987)
- De Brillenkoker (1990)
- Neerlands Bloed (1991)
- Opa's Wijsvinger (1993)
- De Rode Draad (1995)
- De Hoekvlag (2000)
- Door de Knieën (2004)
- Leven na de Dood (2004)
- De Toeschouwer (2006)

== Movies ==
- The Illusionist (1983)
- De KKKomediant (1986)
