= Tokyo (Hans Vandenburg song) =

Single by Hans Vandenburg & Ajax Supporters
- Released: 1995
- Genre: Pop rock
- Label: Van Record Company
- Songwriters: Vandefruits (lyrics & music); Phil Spectacles (music); Alex Chilton (lyrics)
- Producer: Phil Spectacles

"Tokyo" is the second solo single by the Dutch artist Hans Vandenburg, lead singer of Gruppo Sportivo. It was released in 1995 under Van Record Company in the Netherlands.

The title track is dedicated to Dutch association football club AFC Ajax after the team qualified for the 1995 Intercontinental Cup hosted in Tokyo, by winning the UEFA Champions League title against Italian side A.C. Milan 1–0 in the final.

Ajax would face-off with Brazilian side Grêmio at the National Stadium on 28 November 1995, winning the Cup 4 – 3 on penalties after extra time.

The single was a one-off collaborative effort between Vandenburg and the Ajax Supporters, organized by Ron de Gruyl and Music Trend Media Amsterdam.

== Track listing ==
All lyrics are written by Vanderfruit, except track 3 written by Alex Chilton.

CD
No.	Title	Lyrics	Music	Featuring	Length
1.	"Tokyo (NL)"	Vanderfruit	Phil Spectacles		2:21
2.	"Bl☆☆dy Cup-final Day"	Vanderfruit	Phil Spectacles	Gerrit-Jan Konink	3:14
3.	"I'm In Love With A Girl"	Alex Chilton	Phil Spectacles		1:41
4.	"Tokyo (UK)"	Vanderfruit	Phil Spectacles	Hans Dulfer	3:41
