= Van (album) =

Van.

Studio album by Tomiko Van
- Released: December 10, 2008
- Recorded: 2006–2008
- Genre: J-pop
- Label: Avex Trax

Tomiko Van chronology
Voice 2: Cover Lovers Rock (2008)	Van. (2008)

CD + DVD

Van. is the fourth solo album and second original studio album from Japanese singer Tomiko Van. It was released on December 10, 2008 and contains the title tracks of all four of her solo singles, as well as two b-sides and five new tracks, for an overall total of eleven tracks.

== Track listing ==
=== CD ===
- Catalog number: AVCD-23712
1. Flower
2. Utopia
3. manacles
4. Brave
5. Yumeji (夢路; Dream Road)
6. carry out
7. Senkou (閃光; Glint)
8. message.
9. Tokyo Biyori (東京日和; Tokyo Weather)
10. Refrain
11. Van. (Instrumental Track)

=== DVD ===
1. Flower
2. Senkou
3. Yumeji
4. Tokyo Biyori
5. Flower (a-nation)

== Charts ==
Chart	Peak position	Sales
Oricon Weekly Albums	28	8,852
