= Tokyo Biyori =

Single by Tomiko Van

from the album Van.
- Released: June 18, 2008
- Label: Avex Trax
- Songwriter: Tomiko Van

Tomiko Van singles chronology
"Yumeji" (2006)	"Tokyo Biyori" (2008)

Alternative cover
- CD + DVD

"Tokyo Biyori" (東京日和, Tokyo Weather) is the fourth solo single from J-pop vocalist Tomiko Van, released on June 18, 2008. The track "Hum a Tune" is a cover of a song by Japanese band Original Love. "Message" is said to be Van's first musical composition, and "Tokyo Biyori" is said to be composed by Kazuo Zaitsu of Tulip.

== Track listing ==
1. "Tokyo Biyori" (東京日和, Tokyo Weather)
2. "Message."
3. "Hum a Tune"
4. "Tokyo Biyori" (Instrumental) (東京日和, Tokyo Weather)
5. "Message." (instrumental)
