= Tomiko Van =

Tomiko Van 伴 都美子
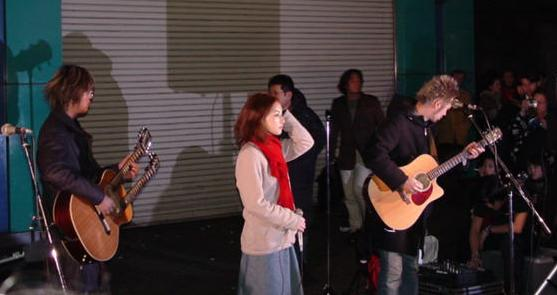
- Tomiko Van in Shibuya with Do As Infinity members

Background information
- Born: January 9, 1979 (age 47); Yamato, Kumamoto, Japan
- Genres: Anison; J-pop; Jazz; Rock music
- Occupations: Musician; Record producer; Singer-songwriter
- Instrument: Vocals
- Years active: 1999–present
- Label: Avex Trax (1999–present)
- Member of: Do As Infinity
- Website: avex.jp/van/prof/index.html

Japanese name
- Kanji: 伴 都美子
- Hiragana: ばん とみこ
- Katakana: バン トミコ
Transcriptions
- Romanization: Ban Tomiko

Tomiko Van (伴 都美子, Ban Tomiko; born January 9, 1979), is a Japanese pop singer and occasional actress. She is as a member of the band Do As Infinity (DAI), along with Ryo Owatari and Dai Nagao, that has resumed activities after their 2005 split.

== Career ==
=== Beginnings as solo artist ===
Tomiko Van began as a solo artist while she was with Do As Infinity with the song "Again", which appeared on the charity album Song Nation, and later in 2003 with the song "Drive me nuts", which was recorded for trance DJs project Cyber X. Van also appeared in six commercials for the Japanese hair product company Lavenus.

=== 2005 ===
After Do As Infinity disbanded on September 29, 2005, Avex Trax, Van's label, announced that Van was going solo.

=== 2006 ===
In 2006, Van made her debut as a solo artist with her album Farewell. Singles were not released prior to her album, released in March 2006. Her first official single as a solo artist, "Flower", was released in June of the same year, and made the weekly top ten of the Japanese charts. Two other singles followed that year, "Senkō", in September, and "Yumeji", a late November release.

=== 2007 ===
Van began 2007 with her first cover album, Voice: Cover You With Love. The album was Van's only release that year. Tomiko van also acted in a movie Heat Island.

=== 2008 ===
In 2008, Van's third album and second cover album, Voice 2: Cover Lovers Rock, was released in March. In this album, she covered songs performed by male artists, such as Spitz and Masaharu Fukuyama. Despite her one-year hiatus from the music scene, the album charted at number 10 on the first day of release. Van's fourth solo single, "Tokyo Biyori", was released on June 18, 2008. Her second original album, Van, was released in December 2008.

On September 29, 2008, Do As Infinity officially reunited as a band, and released a four-track single on June 17, 2009.

== Personal life ==
Van married a man in September 2012, first publicly announcing her marriage at a Do As Infinity concert at Shibuya AX in Tokyo on September 29. As of 2016, she is the mother of two children. She divorced in July 2018.

== Discography ==
=== Singles ===
Information	Sales
"Flower": Released: June 7, 2006; Oricon Top 200 daily peak: 7; Oricon Top 200 weekly peak: 10; Weeks on chart: 6	24,230 copies sold
"Senkō": Released: September 27, 2006; Oricon Top 200 Daily peak: 8; Oricon Top 200 Weekly peak: 14; Weeks on chart: 4	13,860 copies sold
"Yumeji": Released: November 29, 2006; Oricon Top 200 Daily peak: 10; Oricon Top 200 Weekly peak: 14; Weeks on chart: 3	10,237 copies sold
"Tokyo Biyori": Released: June 18, 2008; Oricon Top 200 Daily peak: 9; Oricon Top 200 Weekly peak: 18; Weeks on chart: 3	10,500 copies sold

=== Albums ===
Information	Sales
Farewell: Released: March 29, 2006; Oricon Top 200 weekly peak: 7; Weeks on chart: 10; Oricon Daily Chart: 5	45,409 copies sold
Voice: Cover You With Love: Released: March 28, 2007; Oricon Top 200 weekly peak: 22; Weeks on chart: 4; Oricon Daily Chart: 13	14,581 copies sold
Voice 2: Cover Lovers Rock: Released: March 5, 2008; Oricon Top 200 weekly peak: 28; Weeks on chart:4; Oricon Daily Chart: 10	7,979 copies sold
Van.: Released: December 10, 2008; Oricon Top 200 weekly peak: 28; Weeks on chart: 4; Oricon Daily Chart: 9	8,852 copies sold

=== Music videos ===
Year	Song	Director
2006	"Flower"	Masaki Ookita
2006	"Hold Me..."	Ten Shimoyama
2006	"Farewell"	Naoto Kumasawa
2006	"Senkō" (閃光; Flash of Light)	Hiroshi Usui
2006	"Yumeji" (夢路; Dream Road)	Wataru Takeishi
2007	"Yoru ni Kizutsuite" (夜に傷ついて; Hurt in the Night)	Wataru Takeishi
2008	"Cherry"	Ryuuji Seki
2008	"Tokyo Biyori" (東京日和; Tokyo Weather)	Ryuuji Seki

== Featured and collaborative releases ==
- "Drive Me Nuts" (Cyber X feat. Tomiko Van)
- "Truth'94 -Meets Tomiko Van-" (cover version of TRF's original song)
- "Again" (various artists album, Song Nation, an Avex project consisting of collaborations between many different Avex artists)
- "Music Flower" (Kohey Tsuchiya & various artists)
- "Velvet" (Kikkawa Kouji)
