= Supersister =

Dutch progressive rock band

- Also known as: Sweet O.K. Supersister (1968); The Blubs (1965-1968)
- Origin: The Hague, Netherlands
- Genres: Progressive rock; Canterbury scene; jazz fusion (1973-1974)
- Years active: 1967-1975; 2000-2001; 2010-2011; 2023-
- Spinoffs: Supersister Projekt 2019 (2019-2022)
- Past members: Robert Jan Stips; Marco Vrolijk; Sacha van Geest; Ron van Eck; Rob Douw; Charlie Mariano; Herman van Boeyen; Rob Kruisman; John Schuursma; Elton Dean; Gerhard Smid; Daniel Denis
- Website: supersister.nl

Supersister is a Dutch progressive rock band formed in The Hague, Netherlands in 1968. The classic lineup consisted of Robert Jan Stips (keyboards, vocals), Sacha van Geest (flute), Marco Vrolijk (drums) and Ron van Eck (bass). The group underwent multiple lineup changes over the course of its history, including the deaths of van Geest and van Eck. Their first and biggest hit was "She Was Naked" in 1970.

== History ==
Originally formed as a school band under the name The Blubs in 1965, the band's initial lineup included Stips, Vrolijk, van Geest, van Eck, and briefly Rob Douw and Daniel Denis. The Blubs continued to play at local venues for the next three years. After Douw and Denis both left in 1968, the remaining quartet renamed themselves Supersister in 1968.

The single She Was Naked spawned their biggest hit to date, reaching the Netherlands Top 40 and granting them a record deal with Polydor Records that same year. In 1970 Polydor Records released their first album Present from Nancy in 1970 The next two years see the release of To The Highest Bidder and Pudding and Gisteren, followed by the departure of van Geest and Vrolijk (replaced by Charly Mariano and Herman van Boeyen, respectively).

By 1973, the band started to incorporate more jazz fusion elements into their music moving forward and began recording what would become their fourth album Iskander. After its release, Mariano was replaced by Elton Dean while Stips left the band to play keyboards briefly in another Dutch band, Golden Earring. The band decided to split up after the release of their fifth album Spiral Staircase in 1974, citing diminishing interest in the band's jazz fusion direction and lackluster commercial reception.

A 2000 reunion included the "classic" lineup of the band (Stips, van Geest, Vrolijk, and van Eck) and was held at Progfest in Los Angeles. Memories Are New, the band's first official studio album in 26 years, was released to commemorate the reunion and included new material from 1969 to 1973. The reunion came to a premature end as Sacha van Geest unexpectedly died of a heart attack in 2001.

In 2010, the last three remaining members of the "classic" lineup reunited once again for a performance at VPRO. In 2011, Ron van Eck died of cancer and Stips and Vrolijk decide to permanently split up the band. Almost a decade later in 2019, Robert Jan Stips announced the formation of a spin-off group called the Supersister Projekt 2019, with two new members; Rinus Gerritsen and Leon Klaasse. The new band continued touring throughout the next years and in 2024, the band released The Elton Dean Sessions which includes live sessions recorded from that era with Elton Dean. In 2025, the band released the studio album Nancy Never Knew, the first studio album released under the official band name in decades.

== Members ==
- Robert Jan Stips - vocals, keyboard (1968-1974, 2000–2001, 2010–2011, 2019-present)
- Leon Klaasse - drums (2019-present)
- Rinus Gerritsen - bass (2019-present)

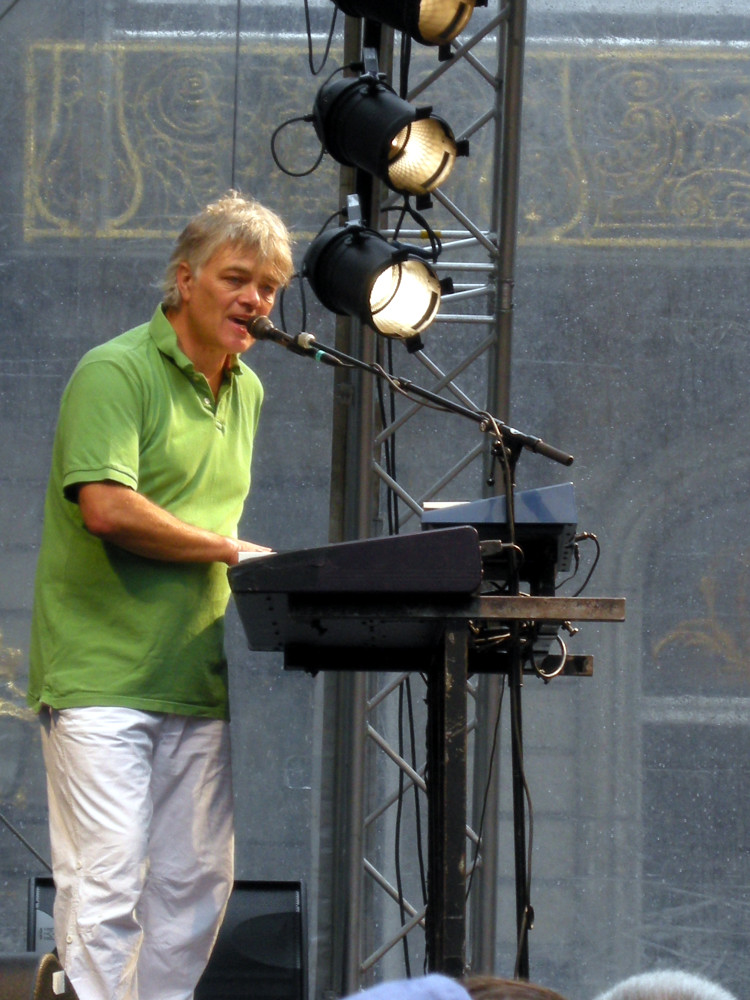
Robert Jan Stips performing in 2008

=== Past members ===
- Sacha van Geest - flute (1968-1972, 2000–2001; died 2001)
- Marco Vrolijk - drums (1968-1972, 2000–2001, 2010–2011)
- Ron van Eck - bass (1968-1974, 2000–2001, 2010–2011; died 2011)
- Rob Douw - vocals, songwriting (1967-1968)
- Charley Mariano - flute, clarinet, saxophone (1973-1974)
- Herman van Boeyen - drums (1973-1974)
- Rob Kruisman - flute, saxophone (1974)
- John Schuursma - guitar (1974)
- Elton Dean - saxophone (1974-1975)
- Gerhard Smid - guitar, vocals (1968-1969)
- Daniel Denis - drums (1965-1968)

== Discography ==
=== Studio albums ===
Title	Details
Present from Nancy	Released: 1970 Label: Polydor Records
To The Highest Bidder	Released: 1971 Label: Polydor Records
Pudding And Gisteren	Released: 1972 Label: Polydor Records
Iskander	Released: 1973 Label: Polydor Records
Spiral Staircase	Released: 1974 Label: Polydor Records
Memories Are New	Released: 2000 Label: Soss Music
Retsis Repus (Supersister Projekt 2019)	Released: 2019 Label: Soss Music
Nancy Never Knew	Released: 2025 Label: Soss Music

=== Live albums ===
Title	Details
Supersisterious	Released: 2001 Label: Soss Music
Long Live Supersister!	Released: 2013 Label: Pseudonym Records / VPRO
Live In Scheveningen 1972	Released: September 4, 2021 Label: Soss Music
The Elton Dean Sessions	Released: 2024 Label: Soss Music

=== Compilations ===
Title	Details
Superstarshine Vol. 3	Released: 1972 Label: Polydor Records
Startrack Vol. 1	Released: 1973 Label: Polydor Records
Present From Nancy / To The Highest Bidder	Released: 1990 Label: Polydor Records
Iskander / Spiral Staircase	Released: 1990 Label: Polydor Records
Pudding En Gisteren / Superstarshine	Released: 1990 Label: Polydor Records
The Universal Masters Collection	Released: 2002 Label: Polydor Records
Dreaming Wheelwhile	Released: 2012 Label: Music On Vinyl
Iskander / To The Highest Bidder	Released: 2012 Label: Polydor Records / Universal Music
Present From Nancy / Pudding And Gisteren	Released: 2015 Label: Polydor Records / Universal Music
The Golden Years Of Dutch Pop Music (A&B Sides And More)	Released: 2016 Label: Universal Music
Memories Are New (Complete Studio Albums Collection + Bonus CD)	Released: 2018 Label: Universal Music
Looking Back, Naked	Released: 2020 No Label
The Sound Of Music - The First Fifty Years 1970-2020	Released: 2021 Label: Music On Vinyl, Polydor Records

=== Singles ===
Title	Details
She Was Naked / Spiral Staircase	Released: 1970 Label: Blossom Records
Fancy Nancy	Released: 1970 Label: Polydor Records
A Girl Named You / Missing Link	Released: 1971 Label: Polydor Records
No Tree Will Grow / A Girl Named You	Released: 1971 Label: Polydor Records
No Tree Will Grow / She Was Naked	Released: 1971 Label: Polydor Records
No Tree Will Grow (On Too High A Mountain)	Released: 1972 Label: Polydor Records
Radio	Released: 1972 Label: Polydor Records
Wow	Released: 1973 Label: Polydor Records
Bagoas	Released: 1973 Label: Polydor Records
Coconut Woman (feat. Los Alegres) / Here Comes The Doctor	Released: 1975 Label: Polydor Records
