= Robert Jan Stips =

Dutch musician

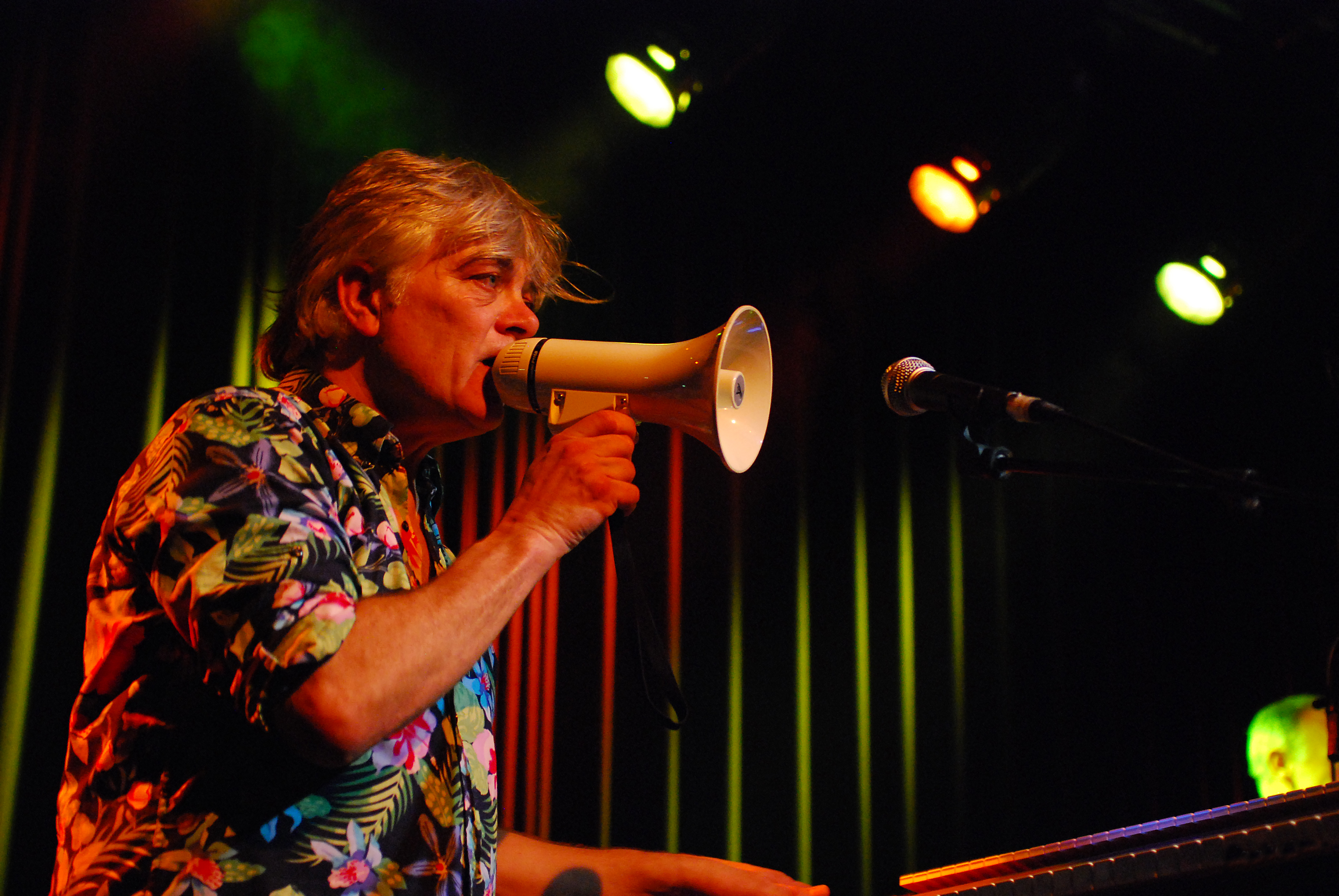
- Robert Jan Stips and Nits 7 November 2008

Background information
- Born: 4 February 1950 (age 76); The Hague, Netherlands
- Genres: Rock
- Occupations: Musician, songwriter, record producer
- Instruments: Vocals, keyboards

Robert Jan Stips (4 February 1950) is a Dutch musician born in The Hague.

He initially found fame as a keyboard player, arranger, and producer with the group Supersister. This led to an invitation to join Golden Earring, one of the most successful Dutch groups of the time. In 1975, Stips appeared on the group's follow-up to their smash hit Moontan (including their international hit, "Radar Love"). Entitled Switch, this follow-up album featured Stips' playing throughout. In 1976, Stips appeared as a full-fledged band member on To the Hilt. This album would prove to be his last full effort with the group. Stips also took part in the group's successful American tour in 1976, but left afterwards to form Stars & Stips which released Nevergreens in 1976, and the group Sweet d'Buster with fellow intermittent Golden Earring bandmember, saxophonist Bertus Borgers. Stips has guested on several Golden Earring efforts since.

Between 1977 and 1981 Stips produced three albums by the popular band Gruppo Sportivo: Ten Mistakes (1977), Back To 78 (1978) and Pop! Goes The Brain (1981). He also produced the first solo album by Gruppo Sportivo's frontman and main songwriter Hans Vandenburg: Buddy Odor Is A Gas! by The Buddy Odor Stop.

In 1979, Stips left Sweet d'Buster and formed Transister, which released one album: Zig Zag. In 1981, Robert Jan Stips released his first solo LP (U.P.). The same year, Stips became the keyboard player for The Nits, with whom he had previously worked as a producer. During his years with The Nits he also produced albums for Cloud Nine and Vitesse. He was the main composer of The Nits' orchestral work, Hjuvi - A Rhapsody in Time. In 1982 Stips appeared on Golden Earring's Cut release. It featured the group's worldwide hit "Twilight Zone". Stips also plays on the group's 1986 release The Hole.

Robert Jan Stips left Nits in 1996 at the end of their Greatest Hits tour, and launched the group STIPS, with which he brought out the album Egotrip. STIPS released two albums in collaboration with Freek de Jonge, Gemeen Goed (1997) and Rapsodia (1998). In 1999, Robert Jan Stips released two solo albums : Greyhound and Rembrandt 2000 (at the occasion of a great exhibition Rembrandt in The Hague). He also appeared on Golden Earring's "Last Blast of the Century." A two disc live career retrospective. In 2003, he rejoined Nits for their thirtieth anniversary tour. He played on the subsequent albums and has continued to tour with the group.

In 2019 Stips launched the Supersister Projekt 2019 and released new album Retsis Repus.

== Discography ==
- 1970 Supersister - Present From Nancy
- 1971 Supersister - To The Highest Bidder
- 1972 Supersister - Pudding en Gisteren
- 1973 Supersister - Iskander
- 1974 Sweet Okay Supersister - Spiral Staircase
- 1975 Golden Earring - Switch
- 1976 Golden Earring - To The Hilt
- 1976 Stars & Stips - Nevergreens
- 1977 Sweet d'Buster - Sweet d'Buster
- 1978 Sweet d'Buster - Friction
- 1979 Transister - Zig Zag
- 1981 Robert Jan Stips - U.P.
- 1981 The Nits - New Flat
- 1982 Golden Earring - Cut
- 1983 The Nits - Omsk
- 1983 The Nits - Kilo
- 1984 The Nits - Adieu, Sweet Bahnhof
- 1986 The Nits - Henk
- 1986 Golden Earring - The Hole
- 1987 The Nits - In The Dutch Mountains
- 1988 The Nits - Hat
- 1989 Nits - Urk
- 1990 Nits - Giant Normal Dwarf
- 1992 Nits - Ting
- 1992 Nits - Hjuvi: A Rhapsody In Time
- 1995 Nits - dA dA dA
- 1996 Nits - In Concert
- 1996 S.T.I.P.S. - Egotrip
- 1997 Freek de Jonge & STIPS - Gemeen Goed
- 1998 Freek de Jonge & STIPS - Rapsodia
- 1998 Robert Jan Stips - Greyhound
- 1999 Robert Jan Stips - Rembrandt 2000
- 2000 Supersister - Memories Are New - M.A.N.
- 2001 Supersister - Supersisterious
- 2005 Nits - Les Nuits
- 2008 Nits - Doing The Dishes
- 2008 Nits - Truce Diaries
- 2009 Nits - Strawberry Wood
- 2009 Robert Jan Stips - Rond: Piano & Songs
- 2012 Nits - Malpensa
- 2012 Robert Jan Stips - 12 Steden, 13 Ongelukken
- 2014 RJ Stips / W Stips - KIND van 70
- 2015 Nits - Hotel Europa
- 2015 Robert Jan Stips - RJ's Tribute To 55 Years Golden Earring
- 2015 Robert Jan Stips - Don't Lose Heart / Verlies Niet de Moed
- 2016 Robert Jan Stips - Present To The Highest Pudding: Three Supersister albums played on three grand pianos simultaneously
- 2017 Nits - angst
- 2017 Fabelhaft - O Die Zee - 11 Songs
- 2019 Supersister Projekt 2019 - Retsis Repus
- 2019 Nits - Knot
- 2022 Nits - Neon
- 2024 Nits - Tree House Fire

== Filmography ==
- 2015: Romantic Warriors III: Canterbury Tales (DVD)
