= Do As Infinity discography =

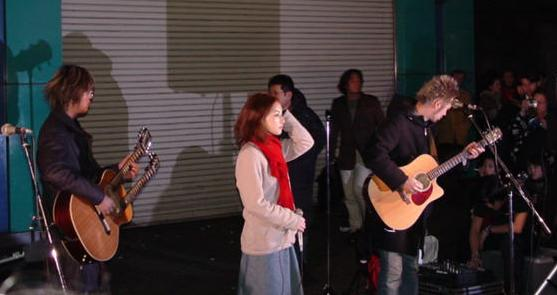
- Do As Infinity performing live in 2000 in Shibuya, Tokyo. Left to right: Dai Nagao, Tomiko Van, and Ryo Owatari.
- Studio albums: 14
- Live albums: 5
- Compilation albums: 10
- Singles: 31
- Video albums: 19
- Music videos: 39
- Other albums: 82
- Other video albums: 10
- Box sets: 1

The discography of Do As Infinity, a J-pop and rock band formed in Aoyama, Tokyo, Japan, consists of 14 studio albums, 5 live albums, 10 compilation albums, 31 singles, 19 video releases, and 39 music videos. Composer Dai Nagao of Avex Trax hosted auditions for a band in 1999, eventually choosing Tomiko Van as lead vocalist and Ryo Owatari as guitarist. The trio released their first single "Tangerine Dream" in 1999 and released three more singles between 1999 and 2000 which appeared on their debut album Break of Dawn (2000). Break of Dawn did well commercially, peaking at No. 3 on the Japanese Oricon albums chart. In December 2000, Nagao decided to devote all his time to composing the music and no longer appeared at live events. Do As Infinity's next two studio albums released in 2001, New World and Deep Forest, both peaked at No. 1 on Oricon. The band released their first greatest hits compilation album Do the Best in 2002, which also charted at No. 1. Do As Infinity's next three studio albums charted in the top 5 of Oricon: True Song (2002) at No. 5, Gates of Heaven (2003) at No. 3, and Need Your Love (2005) also at No. 3.

Following the release of their A-side singles compilation album Do the A-side, Do As Infinity disbanded in September 2005, with Van pursuing a solo career, Owatari working with his band Missile Innovation formed in 2004, and Nagao continuing to work with other artists at Avex Trax, such as Amasia Landscape. Three years later in September 2008, the band reformed with Van and Owatari, though Nagao did not return. Do As Infinity released their 21st single "∞1" in June 2009 which peaked at No. 10 on Oricon, followed by their seventh studio album Eternal Flame in September 2009, which peaked at No. 9 on Oricon. The band's eighth studio album Eight (2011) peaked at No. 4 on Oricon. Do As Infinity released two studio albums in 2012: Time Machine which peaked at No. 14 on Oricon, and Do As Infinity X which peaked at No. 15 on Oricon. The band's 11th studio album Brand New Days was released in 2015, and their 12th studio album Alive was released in 2018.

== Albums ==
=== Studio albums ===
Year	Album details	Peak Oricon chart positions	Certifications (sales thresholds)
2000	Break of Dawn: Released: March 23, 2000; Label: Avex Trax {AVCD-11804); Format: CD	3	
2001	New World: Released: February 21, 2001; Label: Avex Trax (AVCD-11880); Format: CD	1	
2001	Deep Forest: Released: September 19, 2001; Label: Avex Trax (AVCD-11981); Format: CD	1	JP: Platinum
2002	True Song: Released: December 26, 2002; Label: Avex Trax (AVCD-17205); Format: CD	5	JP: Platinum
2003	Gates of Heaven: Released: November 27, 2003; Label: Avex Trax (AVCD-17358); Format: CD	3	JP: Platinum
2005	Need Your Love: Released: February 16, 2005; Label: Avex Trax (AVCD-17618, AVCD-17619, AVCD-17620, AVCD-17621, AVGD-17622, AVAD-91258); Format: CD, CD+DVD, CD+DVD+T-shirt (2), SACD, DVD-Audio	3	JP: Gold
2009	Eternal Flame: Released: September 30, 2009; Label: Avex Trax (AVCD-23922, AVCD-23923); Format: CD, CD+DVD	9	
2011	Eight: Released: January 19, 2011; Label: Avex Trax (AVCD-38139, AVCD-38140); Format: CD, CD+DVD	4	
2012	Time Machine: Released: February 29, 2012; Label: Avex Trax (AVCD-38413, AVCD-38414); Format: CD, CD+DVD	14	
2012	Do As Infinity X: Released: October 10, 2012; Label: Avex Trax (AVCD-38556, AVCD-38557); Format: CD, CD+DVD	15	
2015	Brand New Days: Released: February 25, 2015; Label: Avex Trax (AVCD-93071, AVCD-93070/B); Format: CD, CD+DVD	37	
2018	Alive: Released: February 28, 2018; Label: Avex Trax (AVCD-93825, AVCD-93823/B); Format: CD, CD+DVD	30	
2019	Do As Infinity: Released: September 25, 2019; Label: Avex Trax; Format: CD	27	
2026	Reborn: Released: January 28, 2026; Label: Avex Trax; Format: CD	25	

=== Live albums ===
Year	Album details	Peak Oricon chart positions
2003	Do the Live: Released: March 12, 2003; Label: Avex Trax (AVCD-17275—17276); Format: CD	12
2004	Live in Japan: Released: March 31, 2004; Label: Avex Trax (AVCD-17414—17415); Format: CD	23
2006	Do As Infinity: Final: Released: March 15, 2006; Label: Avex Trax (AVCD-17906—17908); Format: CD	43
2014	Do As Infinity 14th Anniversary: Dive At It Limited Live 2013: Released: March 12, 2014; Label: Avex Trax (AVCD-38922—38923); Format: CD	87
2016	Do As Infinity 16th Anniversary: October's Garden: Released: February 24, 2016; Label: Avex Trax (AVCD-93348—93349); Format: CD	63

=== Compilation albums ===
Year	Album details	Peak Oricon chart positions	Certifications
2002	Do the Best: Released: March 20, 2002; Label: Avex Trax (AVCD-17110, AVAD-91206); Format: CD, DVD-Audio	1	Japan Gold Disc Award: Rock & Pop Album of the Year, 2003
2004	Do the Best+DVD: Released: March 31, 2004; Label: Avex Trax (AVCD-17429); Format: CD+DVD	33	
2004	Do the B-side: Released: September 23, 2004; Label: Avex Trax (AVCD-17544—17545); Format: CD, CD+T-shirt	7	
2005	Do the A-side: Released: September 28, 2005; Label: Avex Trax (AVCD-17660—17661, AVCD-17662—17663); Format: CD, CD+DVD	3	JP: Platinum
2006	Do the Best "Great Supporters Selection": Released: March 15, 2006; Label: Avex Trax (AVCD-17940—17941); Format: CD	26	
2006	Minus V: Released: March 15, 2006; Label: Avex Trax (AVCD-17942); Format: CD	141	
2014	The Best of Do As Infinity: Released: January 1, 2014; Label: Avex Trax (AVCD-38821—38822, AVCD-38819—38820/B); Format: CD, CD+DVD	33	
2016	2 of Us [Red] -14 Re:Singles-: Released: February 24, 2016; Label: Avex Trax (AVCD-93335, AVCD-93333/B, AVCD-93334/B); Format: CD, CD+DVD, CD+DVD+Blu-ray	40	
2016	2 of Us [Blue] -14 Re:Singles-: Released: February 24, 2016; Label: Avex Trax (AVCD-93332, AVCD-93330/B, AVCD-93331/B); Format: CD, CD+DVD, CD+DVD+Blu-ray	41	
2019	Lounge: Released: June 5, 2019; Label: Avex Trax (AVCD-96295, AVCD-96293/B, AVCD-96294/B); Format: CD, CD+DVD, CD_Blu-ray	31	

=== Box set ===
Year	Album details	Peak Oricon chart positions
2006	Do the Box: Released: March 15, 2006; Label: Avex Trax (AVCD-17911—17917); Format: CD+DVD	56

== Singles ==
Year	Song(s)	Peak Oricon chart positions	Certifications	Album
1999	"Tangerine Dream"	58		Break of Dawn
1999	"Heart"	56		Break of Dawn
2000	"Oasis"	25		Break of Dawn
2000	"Yesterday & Today"	10		Break of Dawn
2000	"Rumble Fish"	20		New World
2000	"We Are."	16		New World
2001	"Desire"	8		New World
2001	"Tōku Made"	12		Deep Forest
2001	"Week!"	8		Deep Forest
2001	"Fukai Mori"	5	JP: Gold	Deep Forest
2001	"Bōkenshatachi"	7		Deep Forest
2002	"Hi no Ataru Sakamichi"	5	JP: Gold	Do the Best
2002	"Under the Sun / Under the Moon"	5		True Song; Do the A-side^{[A]}
2002	"Shinjitsu no Uta"	5		True Song
2003	"Mahou no Kotoba (Would You Marry Me?)"	4	JP: Gold	Gates of Heaven
2003	"Honjitsu wa Seiten Nari"	4	JP: Gold	Gates of Heaven
2003	"Hiiragi"	7	JP: Gold	Gates of Heaven
2004	"Rakuen"	2	JP: Gold	Need Your Love
2005	"For the Future"	6		Need Your Love
2005	"Tao"	11		Do the A-side
2009	"∞1"	10		Eternal Flame^{[B]}
2010	"Kimi ga Inai Mirai"	10		Eight^{[C]}
2010	"∞2"	13		Eight^{[C]}
2010	"Jidaishin"	—^{[D]}		Eight^{[C]}
2011	"Chikai"	28		Time Machine
2011	"Ariadne no Ito"	16		Time Machine
2011	"Tasogare"	29		Time Machine
2014	"Mysterious Magic"	46		Brand New Days
2017	"Alive / Iron Hornet"	38		Alive
2017	"To Know You"	43		Alive
2017	"Keshin no Kemono"	41		Alive
"—" denotes releases that did not chart.

== Videos ==
Year	Video details	Peak Oricon chart positions
2001	9: Released: March 7, 2001; Label: Avex Trax (AVVD-90097, AVBD-91043); Format: VHS, DVD	7
2001	"Tōku Made": Released: April 25, 2001; Label: Avex Trax (AVBD-91055); Format: DVD	18
2001	5: Released: September 27, 2001; Label: Avex Trax (AVVD-90131, AVBD-91075); Format: VHS, DVD	7
2002	Live Tour 2001: Deep Forest: Released: March 20, 2002; Label: Avex Trax (AVBD-91100); Format: DVD	9
2002	The Clip Selection: Released: December 11, 2002; Label: Avex Trax (AVBD-91132); Format: DVD	35
2002	"Shinjitsu no Uta": Released: December 26, 2002; Label: Avex Trax (AVBD-91122); Format: DVD	38
2004	8: Released: January 7, 2004; Label: Avex Trax (AVBD-91169); Format: DVD	8
2004	Live in Japan: Released: March 31, 2004; Label: Avex Trax (AVBD-91175); Format: DVD	13
2005	Live Year 2004: Released: March 2, 2005; Label: Avex Trax (AVBD-91266); Format: DVD	22
2005	Live in Japan II: Released: September 28, 2005; Label: Avex Trax (AVBD-91339); Format: DVD	6
2006	Do As Infinity: Final: Released: March 15, 2006; Label: Avex Trax (AVBD-91396—91397, AVBD-91398—91399); Format: DVD, DVD+T-shirt	9
2006	3rd Anniversary Special Live: Released: September 20, 2006; Label: Avex Trax (AVBD-91429); Format: DVD	76
2006	Do As Infinity: Premier: Released: September 20, 2006; Label: Avex Trax (AVBD-91430); Format: DVD	68
2009	Do the Clips: Released: February 18, 2009; Label: Avex Trax (AVBD-91586); Format: DVD	20
2009	Free Live: Free Soul! Free Spirits!: Released: February 18, 2009; Label: Avex Trax (AVBD-91587); Format: DVD	17
2010	Eternal Flame: 10th Anniversary in Nippon Budokan: Released: May 5, 2010; Label: Avex Trax (AVBD-91758—91759); Format: DVD	14
2013	Do As Infinity 13th Anniversary: Dive At It Limited Live 2012: Released: February 13, 2013; Label: Avex Trax (AVXD-91669-B–D, AVXD-91670, AVXD-91982); Format: BD+DVD+2 CD, BD, DVD	243
2014	Do As Infinity 14th Anniversary: Dive At It Limited Live 2013: Released: March 12, 2014; Label: Avex Trax (AVXD-91694, AVBD-92067–92068); Format: BD, DVD	26 (BD); 50 (DVD)
2015	Do As Infinity 15th Anniversary: Dive At It Limited Live 2014: Released: January 21, 2015; Label: Avex Trax (AVBD-92185–92186, AVXD-92187); Format: BD, DVD	(BD) (DVD)

== Music videos ==
Year	Song	Director
1999	"Tangerine Dream"	Suguru Takeuchi
1999	"Heart"	Hideaki Sunaga
2000	"Oasis"	Hideaki Sunaga
2000	"Yesterday & Today"	Hideaki Sunaga
2000	"Raven"	Higuchinsky
2000	"Welcome!"	
2000	"Rumble Fish"	Takeshi Sueda
2000	"We Are."	Shin'ichi Kudō
2001	"Desire"	Shin'ichi Kudō
2001	"Tōku Made"	Shin'ichi Kudō
2001	"Week!"	Ten Shimoyama
2001	"Fukai Mori"	Hideaki Sunaga
2001	"Bōkenshatachi"	
2001	"Enrai"	
2002	"Hi no Ataru Sakamichi"	Shin'ichi Kudō
2002	"Under the Sun"	Tetsuo Inoue
2002	"Under the Moon"	Tetsuo Inoue
2002	"Shinjitsu no Uta"	Tetsuo Inoue
2003	"Mahou no Kotoba (Would You Marry Me?)"	Ten Shimoyama
2003	"Honjitsu wa Seiten Nari"	Chikara Tanaka
2003	"Hiiragi"	Tetsuo Inoue
2003	"Buranko"	
2003	"Field of Dreams"	
2004	"Rakuen"	Takahiro Uchida
2005	"For the Future"	Takahiro Uchida
2005	"Robot"	David Haruyama
2005	"Be Free"	Yōjō Ōhashi
2005	"Tao"	Ukon Uemura
2009	"Umareyuku Monotachi e"	Kensuke Kawamura
2009	"Eternal Flame"	Kensuke Kawamura
2009	"Saigo no Game"	Masahiro Ushiyama
2009	"Nighter"	Kōsuke Suzuki
2010	"Kimi ga Inai Mirai"	Wataru Takeishi
2010	"1/100"	A.T.
2011	"Hand in Hand"	Tarō Okagawa
2011	"Chikai"	Yōjō Ōhashi
2011	"Ariadne no Ito"	Yasuhiko Shimizu
2011	"Tasogare"	Smith
2014	"Mysterious Magic"	

== Other album appearances ==
=== Soundtracks ===
Year	Song(s)	Album	Notes	Ref.
2000	"Raven"	Uzumaki Original Soundtrack	Theme song to Uzumaki film	
2000	"Yesterday & Today"	Say Me: Orgel Selection	Theme song to Ni-sen-nen no Koi TV drama	
2000	"Rumble Fish"	Kamen Gakuen Original Soundtrack	Theme song to Kamen Gakuen film	
2001	"Tōku Made"	Vampire Hunter D Original Soundtrack	Theme song to Vampire Hunter D: Bloodlust animated film	
2001	"Week!"	Yome wa Mitsuboshi. Original Soundtrack	Two remixes of "Week!" were included; theme song to Yome wa Mitsuboshi. TV drama	
2002	"Hi no Ataru Sakamichi"	Hatsutaiken Original Soundtrack	Instrumental version theme song to Hatsutaiken TV drama	
2002	"Fukai Mori"	InuYasha Ongaku-hen Ni	TV-size version theme song to InuYasha anime	
2002	"Shinjitsu no Uta"	"Aoki no Shishi / Shinjitsu no Uta"	Two remixes of "Shinjitsu no Uta" were included and played with jinghu; theme song to Kokusenya Kassen film	
2003	"Fukai Mori" "Shinjitsu no Uta"	Best of InuYasha Hyakkaryōran	Theme songs to InuYasha anime	
2003	"Fukai Mori" "Shinjitsu no Uta"	Wind: InuYasha Kōkyō Renga Symphonic Theme Collection	Theme songs to InuYasha anime	
2003	"Yesterday & Today"	Love Stories I	Theme song to Ni-sen-nen no Koi TV drama	
2003	"Hi no Ataru Sakamichi"	Love Stories II	Theme song to Hatsutaiken TV drama	
2003	"Shinjitsu no Uta"	InuYasha Ongaku-hen San	TV-size version theme song to InuYasha anime	
2004	"Shinjitsu no Uta"	InuYasha: Jigoku de Matteta Shichi-nin-tai! audio drama	TV-size instrumental version theme song to InuYasha anime	
2004	"Week!"	DraMania	Theme song to Yome wa Mitsuboshi. TV drama	
2004	"Honjitsu wa Seiten Nari"	GuitarFreaks 11thMix & DrumMania 10thMix Soundtracks	Cover version by Long Run Music, Inc.; theme song to GuitarFreaks and DrumMania video games	
2004	"Fukai Mori" "Shinjitsu no Uta	Best of InuYasha Seifūmeigetsu	TV-size versions in CD and DVD forms; theme songs to InuYasha anime	
2004	"Hiiragi"	Dramania Second Season	Theme song to Koibumi: Watashitachi ga Aishita Otoko TV drama	
2005	"Tao"	Tales of Legendia Original Soundtrack	Two versions of "Tao" were included; theme song to Tales of Legendia video game	
2006	"Yotaka no Yume"	Zoids Genesis Original Soundtrack	TV-size version to Zoids Genesis anime	
2006	"Tao"	Tales of Legendia: Voice of Character Quest 1	Theme song to Tales of Legendia video game	
2006	"Tao"	Tales of Legendia: Voice of Character Quest 2	Theme song to Tales of Legendia video game	
2007	"Tao"	The Best of Tales	Theme song to Tales of Legendia video game	
2008	"Yesterday & Today"	Happy! Climax Marriage Best	Theme song to Ni-sen-nen no Koi TV drama	
2008	"Fukai Mori"	I Love 30: My Melody	Theme song to InuYasha anime	
2008	"Hi no Ataru Sakamichi"	Drivin' J-pop for Love & Joy	Theme song to Hatsutaiken TV drama	
2009	"Mahou no Kotoba (Would You Marry Me?)"	True Love Best	Theme song to Chocolat TV drama	
2010	"Fukai Mori" "Shinjitsu no Uta" "Rakuen" "Kimi ga Inai Mirai"	InuYasha Best Song History	Theme songs to the InuYasha anime and animated film InuYasha the Movie: Fire on the Mystic Island	

=== Various artist compilation albums ===
Year	Song(s)	Album	Notes	Ref.
1999	"Tangerine Dream"	ZIP-FM 6th Anniversary "Run Together"		
2000	"Yesterday & Today"	Dub's Music Box	Remix version subtitled "Dub's Floor Mix Transport 002"	
2001	"Oasis"	United States of Avex Artists	Cover version in English by Jay Graydon	
2001	"Desire" "We Are."	Aube Collection		
2001	"Oasis"	CliMax		
2001	"Week!"	Dramatic		
2002	"Bōkenshatachi"	A+Nation Vol.1: Summer Power		
2002	"Yesterday & Today"	A+Nation Vol.2: Summer Lover		
2002	"Heart"	A+Nation Vol.3: Remixmix	Remix version subtitled "Keith Litman's Heart Head Remix"	
2002	"Hi no Ataru Sakamichi" "Tōku Made" "Fukai Mori" "Week!" "We Are." "Tangerine Dream" "Bōkenshatachi" "Oasis" "Heart" "Yesterday & Today"	Harmony: J-pop Meets Classics	Disc five of a six CD box set contained ten Do As Infinity tracks	
2002	"We Are."	True Love: Winter Best Songs		
2002	"Yesterday & Today"	Stories: Love Ballade Selection		
2003	"Summer Days" "Oasis" "Tangerine Dream" "Yesterday & Today" "Fukai Mori" "Desire" "Tōku Made" "Enrai" "We Are." "Hi no Ataru Sakamichi"	Avex Orgel Collection Do As Infinity Sakuhinshū	Ten Do As Infinity tracks remixed as music box versions	
2003	"Oasis"	True Love: Spring Memorial Songs		
2003	"Under the Sun"	Avex Super Tune: Best J-pop Selections		
2003	"We Are."	31 Hits: The Japan Gold Disc Award 2003	Great Tour Band version previously included with Do the Best	
2003	"Yesterday & Today" "Fukai Mori"	Harmony: J-pop Meets Classics		
2003	"Yesterday & Today" "Tōku Made" "Hi no Ataru Sakamichi"	15-nen 150-kyoku J-pop 50 Hits Tracks Vol.2		
2003	"Tōku Made"	Single Hits Collection: Best of Avex Anime Gold		
2004	"Yesterday & Today"	Queens: The Most Brilliant Women		
2004	"Yesterday & Today"	Classical BGM 3 Relax Kutsurogi Classic	Classical arrange version	
2004	"Fukai Mori"	Classical BGM 4 Vacation Kyūjitsu Classic	Classical arrange version	
2004	"Hiiragi"	Kokoronokori no Love Letter	Cover version by Reiko Sada	
2004	"Mahou no Kotoba (Would You Marry Me?)"	Virgin Road: The Best of Wedding Songs	An instrumental version was also included	
2004	"Mahou no Kotoba (Would You Marry Me?)"	Eternal Love: For Marriage		
2004	"Honjitsu wa Seiten Nari"	A-Nation '04 Best Hit Summer		
2004	"Fukai Mori" "Shinjitsu no Uta" "Oasis" "Week!" "Yesterday & Today"	Harmony: J-pop Meets Classics for Slow Life	Included on discs one and four of a four-disc box set	
2004	"Oasis"	Dream Meets Best Hits Avex	Cover version by Dream	
2005	"Yesterday & Today"	"Sokuhō! Uta no Daijiten!!" Presents Ballads Daijiten! Shōwa VS Heisei		
2005	"I Miss You?"	Love for Nana: Only 1 Tribute	Compilation tribute album for the Nana manga series	
2005	"Tao"	A-Nation '05 Best Hit Selection		
2006	"Hi no Ataru Sakamichi"	Fleur Yuchiku Selection		
2006	"Thanksgiving Day"	Thanx Grateful to You		
2006	"Honjitsu wa Seiten Nari"	Cheers: Undōkai Songs	An instrumental version was also included	
2006	"We Are."	Beautiful Woman		
2006	"Desire"	A-Mania: Pane! For Skip J-trance	Remix version subtitled Shohei Matsumoto Remix	
2007	"Hiiragi"	Girl's Ballad Best: Tear Drops		
2007	"Week!"	Regain		
2007	"Tangerine Dream"	1st: Debut Single Collection		
2007	"Hi no Ataru Sakamichi"	Winter Love Song		
2008	"Hi no Ataru Sakamichi"	A Love		
2008	"Yesterday & Today" "Tōku Made" "Hi no Ataru Sakamichi" "Hiiragi" "Rakuen"	20-nen 200-kyoku Complete Best Collection Box	Five-disc box set	
2009	"Bōkenshatachi"	J-pop Driving Non-Stop Mix by DJ Ken-Ichiro	Remix version	
2009	"Hi no Ataru Sakamichi"	Sotsugyō no Uta		
2009	"Yesterday & Today" "Tōku Made" "Hi no Ataru Sakamichi" "Hiiragi" "Rakuen"	20-nen 200-kyoku Complete Best + A Love High Quality CD Box	Combines the previous A Love album and 20-nen 200-kyoku Complete Best Collection Box box set with new high quality CDs	
2009	"Hi no Ataru Sakamichi"	Yume ga Kanau Uta		
2009	"Bōkenshatachi"	Dōmo CD: Rei! Dōmo 20-shūnen Collection		
2009	"Let's Get Together at A-Nation"	A-Nation'09 Best Hit Selection		
2010	"Hi no Ataru Sakamichi"	J-popper Densetsu 3		
2010	"Honjitsu wa Seiten Nari"	Holiday Tunes: Odekake Mode		
2010	"Mahou no Kotoba (Would You Marry Me?)"	Spirits 30	Compilation album for the 30-year anniversary of the magazine Big Comic Spirits	
2010	"Saigo no Game"	A-Nation'10 Best Hit Selection		
2011	"Desire"	Utahime Premier: White		
2011	"We Are."	Dramatic Christmas		
2012	"Hi no Ataru Sakamichi"	One Scene: Love So Sweet		
2012	"Yesterday & Today"	One Scene: Love So Bitter		

=== Additional songs ===
Year	Song	Notes	Ref.
2005	"Trust"	Dai Nagao composed "Trust" as Do As Infinity's final song, but by the time the demo was ready to be performed, the band had already disbanded. Nagao released a demo of the song in 2005 performed by I-lulu, a band he helped produce; after the band was renamed Kata-Kana, they released this song on their album Trust Me (2009).	
2009	"Bokutachi no 10th Anniversary"	Released with the book Do The Museum as a commemoration of the band's tenth anniversary	

== Other video album appearances ==
Year	Song(s)	Video album	Artist(s)	Notes	Ref.
2002	"Yesterday & Today"	Love Hearts: Japanese Lovers Selection	Various artists		
2003	"Yesterday & Today"	Space Drive Route1: Techno Remix Ver.	Various artists	Remix version subtitled "Dub's Floor Mix Transport 002"	
2003	"Summer Days" "Hi no Ataru Sakamichi" "Honjitsu wa Seiten Nari"	A-Nation '03 Avex Summer Festa "A-Nation"	Various artists		
2004	"Honjitsu wa Seiten Nari" "Bōkenshatachi"	A-Nation '04 Best Hit Summer Live!!	Various artists		
2005	"Summer Days"	A-Nation'05 Best Hit Live	Various artists		
2007	"Tōku Made" "Yesterday & Today"	Best Live DVD: Premium Live Dream Selection	Various artists		
2008	"Honjitsu wa Seiten Nari"	A-Nation '08: Avex All Cast Special Live	Various artists		
2009	"Saigo no Game"	A-Nation '09 Best Hit Live	Various artists		
2010	"Honjitsu wa Seiten Nari" "Jidaishin"	A-Nation '10 Best Hit Live	Various artists		
2011	"Honjitsu wa Seiten Nari" "Ariadne no Ito"	A-nation for Life Best Hit Live	Various artists		

== Notes ==
- ^{A} "Under the Sun" was later released on True Song, but "Under the Moon" was not released on an album until Do the A-side.
- ^{B} Of the four songs released on "∞1", only "Umareyuku Monotachi e" and "Meramera" were later released on Eternal Flame. The other two songs, "Timeless" and "Let's Get Together at A-Nation", were not placed on an album.
- ^{C} Of the four songs released on "∞2", only "1/100" and "Everything Will Be All Right" were later released on Eight. The other two songs, "Haruka" and "Pile Driver", were not placed on an album.
- ^{D} "Jidaishin" was sold exclusively online on Mu-Mo Shop, where it subsequently sold out, and on the iTunes Store. Due to this, the single was not placed on the Oricon singles chart.
