= Do the Box =

Box set by Do As Infinity
- Released: March 15, 2006
- Genre: Rock
- Label: AVEX Trax
- Producer: Dai Nagao / Seiji Kameda

Do As Infinity chronology
Do the A-side (2006)	Do the Box (2006)	Eternal Flame (2009)

Do the Box is Do As Infinity's album box set after its disbanding. 10,000 copies were made, and each box has its own number printed on itself. It was released among five other different Do As Infinity items on the same day. The box included the six studio albums the band had previously released, as well as a bonus DVD named Do The Works. Do The Works contained two sections: the first one was a documentary of Do As Infinity's activities over the six years they were active, and the second section compiled the commercials for all of their CDs, starting from their debut single, "Tangerine Dream" up to Do the A-side.

== Track listing ==
=== Disc 1 Break of Dawn ===
1. "Break of Dawn"
2. "Standing on the Hill"
3. "Oasis"
4. "Another"
5. "Kokoro no Chizu" (心の地図, Map of the Heart)
6. "Heart"
7. "Raven"
8. "Welcome!"
9. "Painful"
10. "Tangerine Dream"
11. "Yesterday & Today"
  Bonus Tracks
12. "Chiriyuku Yūbe" (散りゆく夕辺, Falling Evening) Acoustic Version
13. "Oasis" Acoustic Version

=== Disc 2 New World ===
1. "New World (Album Mix)"
2. "Guruguru"
3. "Desire"
4. "We Are."
5. "Snail"
6. "Eien" (永遠; Eternity)
7. "Rumble Fish"
8. "Holiday"
9. "135"
10. "Wings 510"
11. "Summer Days"
  Bonus Track
12. "Yesterday & Today" (Strings Orchestral Version)

=== Disc 3 Deep Forest ===
1. "Fukai Mori" (深い森, Deep Forest)
2. "Tōku Made" (遠くまで, Far Away)
3. "Tadaima" (タダイマ, I'm Home)
4. "Get Yourself"
5. "Tsubasa no Keikaku" (翼の計画, Project of Wings)
6. "Kōzō Kaikaku" (構造改革, Change)
7. "Koi Otome" (恋妃, Love Princess)
8. "Week!"
9. "Hang Out"
10. "Boukensha Tachi" (冒険者たち, Adventurers)
11. "Enrai" (遠雷, Distant Thunder)
  Bonus Track
12. "Signal" (シグナル, Shigunaru) (Album Remix)

=== Disc 4 True Song ===
1. "Kūsō Ryodan" (空想旅団, Fantasy Brigade)
2. "Under the Sun"
3. "Good For You"
4. "I Can't Be Myself"
5. "Perfect Lady"
6. "Shinjitsu no Uta" (真実の詩, True Song)
7. "Grateful Journey"
8. "One or Eight"
9. "Sense of Life"
10. "Wadachi-WADACHI-" (轍-WADACHI-, Rut)
11. "Ai no Uta" (あいのうた, Love Song)
  Secret Track
12. "Tōku Made" (遠くまで, Far Away) (Third anniversary special live version)

=== Disc 5 Gates of Heaven ===
1. "Gates of Heaven"
2. "Honjitsu wa Seiten Nari" (本日ハ晴天ナリ; Today Will Be A Fine Day)
3. "Hiiragi" (柊, Holly)
4. "Azayaka na Hana" (アザヤカナハナ, Vivid Flower)
5. "Mahou no Kotoba ~Would you marry me?~" (魔法の言葉 ~Would you marry me?~, Magic Words ~Would you marry me?~)
6. "Buranko" (ブランコ, Swing)
7. "D/N/A"
8. "Weeds"
9. "Field of Dreams"
10. "Kagaku no Yoru" (科学の夜, Night of Chemistry)
11. "Thanksgiving Day"
  Bonus Track
12. "Honjitsu wa Seiten Nari" (本日ハ晴天ナリ, Today Will Be A Fine Day) (a-nation live)

=== Disc 6 Need Your Love ===
1. "For the Future"
2. "Blue"
3. "Be Free"
4. "Rakuen" (楽園, Paradise)
5. "Ever.."
6. "One Flesh"
7. "Robot"
8. "Yotaka no Yume" (夜鷹の夢, Dream of the Nighthawk)
9. "Ultimate G.V"
10. "Need Your Love"
11. "Na no Hanabatake" (菜ノ花畑, Vegetable Garden)
  Bonus Track
12. "Hiiragi" (柊, Holly) Acoustic Version

=== Special DVD Do The Works ===
1. "6 years band documentary"
2. "6 years commercial collection"

== Chart positions ==
Chart (2006)	Peak position	Sales	Time in chart
Japan Oricon	56	5,000	2 weeks
