= Do As Infinity: Final =

Live album by Do As Infinity
- Released: March 15, 2006
- Recorded: Budokan
- Genre: Rock
- Label: AVEX Trax

Do As Infinity chronology
| Do the A-side (2006) | Do As Infinity: Final (2006) | Eternal Flame (2009) |

Do As Infinity: Final is the last live-recorded concert of Japanese band Do As Infinity before they disbanded in 2005. It took place in Budokan on November 25, 2005. The third disc contains bonus tracks featuring various live recorded songs from Do As Infinity's past live shows.

== Track listing ==
=== Disc one ===
1. SE
2. "New World"
3. "Tōku Made" (遠くまで, Far Away)
4. "Oasis"
5. "Nice & Easy"
6. MC
7. "Hi no Ataru Sakamichi" (陽のあたる坂道, Sunny Hill)
8. "Rakuen" (楽園, Paradise)
9. "Hiiragi" (柊, Holly)
10. "Rumble Fish"
11. MC
12. "Tsurezure Naru Mama ni" (徒然なるままに, With Boredom and Tedium at My Side)
13. "Week!"
14. MC
15. "Desire"
16. "Shinjitsu no Uta" (真実の詩, True Song)
17. "Under the Moon"
18. "Mahou no Kotoba ~Would you marry me?~" (魔法の言葉 ~Would you marry me?~, The Magic Words ~Would you marry me?~)

=== Disc two ===
1. "Kūsō Ryodan" (空想旅団, Fantasy Brigade)
2. "Fukai Mori" (深い森, Deep Forest)
3. "Kagaku no Yoru" (科学の夜, Night of Chemistry)
4. "Yesterday & Today"
5. MC
6. "For the Future"
7. "Under the Sun"
8. "Boukensha Tachi" (冒険者たち, Adventurers)
9. "One or Eight"
10. "Honjitsu wa Seiten Nari" (本日ハ晴天ナリ, Today Will Be A Fine Day)
11. "We Are."
12. MC -encore 1-
13. "Field of Dreams" -encore 1-
14. "TAO" -encore 1-
15. MC -encore 1-
16. "Summer Days" -encore 1-

=== Disc three ===
1. MC -encore 2-
2. "Wings"
3. MC -encore 2-
4. "Heart"
5. MC -encore 2-
6. "Tangerine Dream"
7. MC -encore 2-
8. "Ai no Uta" (あいのうた, Love Song)
  Bonus Tracks
9. "Tangerine Dream" (FREE LIVE 100 -99.11.22- Shibuya Kōkaidō)
10. "Raven" (FREE LIVE 100 -99.11.22- Shibuya Kōkaidō)
11. "Oasis" (FREE LIVE 100 -99.11.22- Shibuya Kōkaidō)
12. "Painful" (Do As Infinity Live Tour 2001 - 01.05.27 Shibuya-Ax)
13. "Welcome!" (Do As Infinity Live Tour 2001 - 01.05.27 Shibuya-Ax)
14. "Holiday" (Do As Infinity Live Tour 2001 - 01.05.27 Shibuya-Ax)
15. "Under the Sun" (A-Nation 2002 -02.09.01- Odaiba)
16. "Be Free" (Do As Infinity LIVE TOUR 2005 ~NEED YOUR LOVE~ -05.05.31- Budokan)
17. "Robot" (Do As Infinity LIVE TOUR 2005 ~NEED YOUR LOVE~ -05.05.31- Budokan)
18. "Need Your Love" (Do As Infinity LIVE TOUR 2005 ~NEED YOUR LOVE~ -05.05.31- Budokan)
19. "Glasses" (Do As Infinity LIVE TOUR 2005 ~NEED YOUR LOVE~ -05.05.31- Budokan)

== DVD ==
A live DVD entitled Do As Infinity: Final chronicling the band's final concert on November 25, 2005, in Tokyo's Nippon Budokan was released on March 15, 2006. 15,000 fans were listening to the band as they performed together for a last time until they reformed in 2008. Special guests were Dai Nagao, and former bassist Michitaro.

=== Track listing ===
1. "New World"
2. "Tōku Made"
3. "Oasis"
4. "Nice & Easy"
  -MC-
5. "Hi no Ataru Sakamichi"
6. "Rakuen"
7. "Hiiragi"
8. "Rumble Fish"
  -MC-
9. "Tsurezure Naru Mama ni"
10. -MC-
11. "Week!"
  -MC-
  (Michitaro's appearance)
12. "Desire"
13. "Shinjitsu no Uta"
14. "Under the Moon"
  -MC-
15. "Mahou no Kotoba ~Would you marry me?~"
  (Michitaro leaving)
16. "Kūsō Ryodan"
17. "Fukai Mori"
18. "Kagaku no Yoru"
19. "Yesterday & Today"
  -MC-
20. "For the Future"
21. "Under the Sun"
22. "Boukensha Tachi"
  -Call & response-
23. "One or Eight"
24. "Honjitsu wa Seiten Nari"
25. "We Are."
  -MC-

=== Encore ===
1. "Field of Dreams"
2. "TAO"
3. "Summer Days"
  -MC-
  -Dai Nagao's appearance-
  -Dai, Ryo, Ban-chan (just three of them)
4. "Wings"
5. "Heart"
  -Dai, Ryo, Ban-chan, GTB-
6. "Tangerine Dream"
  -MC-
7. "Ai no Uta"

== Chart positions ==
| Chart (2006) | Peak position | Sales | Time in chart |
|---|---|---|---|
| Japan Oricon^{1} | 43 | 6,007 | 3 weeks |

^{1} CD version
