= The Best of Do As Infinity =

Greatest hits album by Do As Infinity
- Released: January 1, 2014
- Genre: J-pop
- Label: avex trax

Do As Infinity chronology
Do As Infinity X (2012)	The Best of Do As Infinity (2014)

The Best of Do As Infinity+DVD

The Best of Do As Infinity is the sixth compilation album released by Do As Infinity. It was released on the band's 15th anniversary. This album has 30 songs, including two new songs. There are two versions of this album, one with two CDs and the other with two CDs and a DVD.

== Track listing ==
Disc 1
No.	Title	Length
1.	"believe in you"	3:30
2.	"Ariadne no Ito" (アリアドネの糸 Ariadne's Thread)	4:00
3.	"Special"	3:48
4.	"Hi no Ataru Sakamichi" (陽のあたる坂道 Sunny Hill)	4:25
5.	"Chikai" (誓い Oath)	4:26
6.	"Hiiragi" (柊 Holly)	4:34
7.	"Time Machine"	4:00
8.	"Honjitsu wa Seiten Nari" (本日ハ晴天ナリ Today's Gonna Be a Fine Day)	3:17
9.	"Jidaishin"	3:55
10.	"Desire"	4:31
11.	"Nighter" (ナイター Naitā)	3:47
12.	"Tōku Made" (遠くまで Far Away)	4:30
13.	"Umareyuku Monotachi e" (生まれゆくものたちへ To Those Being Born)	4:38
14.	"Tasogare" (黄昏 Twilight)	5:00
15.	"Kūsō Ryodan" (空想旅団 Fantasy Brigade)	4:54

Disc 2
No.	Title	Length
1.	"Kazahana Dayori" (風花便り)	4:03
2.	"Yoake wa Chikai" (ヨアケハチカイ)	4:25
3.	"Timeless"	4:26
4.	"Hand in Hand"	5:07
5.	"Fukai Mori" (深い森 Deep Forest)	4:06
6.	"1/100"	3:44
7.	"Bōkenshatachi" (冒険者たち Adventurers)	4:10
8.	"Week!"	4:17
9.	"Wonderful Life" (ワンダフルライフ Wandafuru Raifu)	3:40
10.	"Saigo no Game" (最後のGAME Last Game)	3:30
11.	"Koi Uta" (恋歌 Love Song)	4:38
12.	"Haruka"	4:32
13.	"Kimi ga Inai Mirai" (君がいない未来 A Future Without You)	4:21
14.	"Kagaku no Yoru" (科学の夜 Night of Science)	5:07
15.	"Yesterday & Today"	5:00

DVD
No.	Title	Length
1.	"Do As Infinity Live Tour 2013-Do As Infinity X-2013/4/27" (Live at Tokyo Dome City Hall)

== Charts ==
Chart (2014)	Peak position
Japan Oricon Weekly Albums	33
