= Live 8 concert, Chiba =

Concert in Chiba, Japan

On 2 July 2005, a Live 8 concert was held at Makuhari Messe, Chiba, Japan.

The event is also referred to as "Live 8 Tokyo" or "Live 8 Japan".

The concert was the first Live 8 show to start, because of Japan's earlier time zone. Attendance for the concert was at maximum capacity, but with only 10,000 people attending the show at the Makuhari Messe venue, it was one of the smallest to join the global series of events. (Note: Only 10,000 tickets were available via online lottery)

Live8 Japan organiser Lily Sobhani was given only 1 month to put the concert together, and Japan's event was announced only a week before the concert. As a result, it was unable to attract the same kind of buzz that counterpart concerts in London and Philadelphia did, but attracted international artists Björk, Good Charlotte and McFly, as well as Japanese stars Dreams Come True, Rize, Def Tech, and Do As Infinity.

Japan is the only Asian country in the G8, and the only Asian country that took part in Live 8.

== Lineup ==
In order of appearance:

- Rize (CH 15:00)
- McFly¹ - "I've Got You", "That Girl", "I'll Be OK", "All About You" "5 Colours In Her Hair", "Obviously" (CH 16:30)
- Good Charlotte - "Lifestyles of the Rich and Famous" "The Anthem", "We Believe" (CH 18:00)
- Dreams Come True - "Mascara Matsuge (Mascara Eyelashes)", "Asahi no Senrei (Morning Baptism)", "Olá! Vitória!", "Nando demo", "Love Love Love (English Version)" (CH 19:30)
- Do As Infinity - "For the future", "Tooku Made", "TAO", "Need Your Love", "Boukensha Tachi", "Honjitsu wa Seiten Nari" (CH 21:00)
- Def Tech (CH 22:30)
- Björk - "Pagan Poetry", "All Is Full of Love", "Desired Constellation", "Jóga", "Hyperballad", "Generous Palmstroke", "Bachelorette", "It's in Our Hands" (CH 00:00)

¹ also performed at the Edinburgh concert on July 6, 2005.
