= List of Oricon number-one albums of 2001 =

These are the Oricon number one albums of 2001, per the Oricon Albums Chart.

== Chart history ==
Key
†	Indicates best-selling album of 2001

Issue Date	Album	Sales	Artist(s)
January 1	Period -the Best Selection-	166,400	Luna Sea
January 15	Very Best	261,400	V6
January 22	The Greatest Hits	351,260	Love Psychedelico
January 29	The Greatest Hits	274,320	Love Psychedelico
February 5	Arashi No.1: Arashi wa Arashi o Yobu!	267,220	Arashi
February 12	Best! Morning Musume 1	1,218,990	Morning Musume.
February 19	Warp	502,470	Judy and Mary
February 26	Toki no Tsubasa	231,850	Zard
March 5	New World	201,310	Do As Infinity
March 12	Da Best of Da Pump	688,390	Da Pump
March 19	Insomnia	441,470	Chihiro Onitsuka
March 26	Clicked Singles Best 13	802,530	L'Arc-en-Ciel
April 2	Smap Vest	1,005,080	SMAP
April 9	Distance †	3,002,720	Hikaru Utada
April 16	A Best	510,160	Ayumi Hamasaki
April 23	Distance †	294,340	Hikaru Utada
April 30	Together! -Tanpopo, Petit, Mini, Yuko-	314,420	Various Artists
May 7	Marvelous	881,150	Misia
May 14	Marvelous	340,590	Misia
May 21	Colorless	201,160	Shela
May 28	Looking Back 2	120,490	Kazumasa Oda
June 4	The Great Escape: Complete Best	374,620	Judy and Mary
June 11	Fun for Fan	242,330	Ami Suzuki
June 18	Love Notes	502,040	The Gospellers
June 25	Love Notes	261,720	The Gospellers
July 2	Natsufuku	380,370	Aiko
July 9	Natsufuku	252,540	Aiko
July 16	Perfect Crime	800,210	Mai Kuraki
July 23	Mr. Children 1992–1995	1,201,730	Mr. Children
July 30	Mr. Children 1992–1995	234,600	Mr. Children
August 6	E Album	400,480	KinKi Kids
August 13	Volume 6	120,140	V6
August 20	qamS	230,230	SMAP
August 27	Glitter	70,260	Mariah Carey
September 3	Bon Appetit!	501,530	Mariya Takeuchi
September 10	Bon Appetit!	348,730	Mariya Takeuchi
September 17	Best + Ura Best + Mihappyōkyokushū	264,870	Cocco
September 24	Best + Ura Best + Mihappyōkyokushū	87,890	Cocco
October 1	Deep Forest	301,580	Do As Infinity
October 8	Super Eurobeat Presents Ayu-ro Mix 2	201,030	Ayumi Hamasaki
October 15	Sugarless	101,950	Shikao Suga
October 22	Woman 2	59,030	Various Artists
October 29	Woman 2	64,870	Various Artists
November 5	Greatest Hits: Chapter One	311,320	Backstreet Boys
November 12	Candlize	401,090	Hitomi Yaida
November 19	The Way We Are	1,143,310	Chemistry
November 26	Sweet, Bitter Sweet Yuming Ballad Best	411,030	Yumi Matsutoya
December 3	Sweet, Bitter Sweet Yuming Ballad Best	210,170	Yumi Matsutoya
December 10	One Love	451,050	Glay
December 17	Monkey Girl Odyssey	200,210	Dreams Come True
December 24	Singles	190,210	My Little Lover
December 31	1st Message	191,810	W-inds

== Annual ==
- Number-one album of 2001: Distance by Hikaru Utada.
- Most weeks at number-one: Aiko, Ayumi Hamasaki, Do As Infinity, Hikaru Utada, Love Psychedelico, Mariya Takeuchi, Misia, Mr. Children, The Gospellers, V6, Yumi Matsutoya with a total of 2 weeks.

== See also ==
- 2001 in music
