= Kimi ga Inai Mirai =

Single by Do As Infinity

from the album Eight
- Released: January 20, 2010
- Genre: J-pop rock
- Length: 17:37
- Label: Avex Trax
- Songwriters: Kano Inoue, Katsumi Ohnishi, Tomiko Van
- Producer: Seiji Kameda

Do As Infinity singles chronology
"∞1" (2009)	"Kimi ga Inai Mirai" (2010)	"∞2" (2010)

Music video
- "Kimi ga Inai Mirai" on YouTube

"Kimi ga Inai Mirai" (君がいない未来; "A Future Without You") is Do As Infinity's 22nd single, released on January 20, 2010. Of the four songs on the single, only the title track is new - the remaining three are the previously released songs "Fukai Mori", "Shinjitsu no Uta" and "Rakuen". The four songs on the single were all used as theme songs to either the Inuyasha anime series or the animated film Inuyasha the Movie: Fire on the Mystic Island; the single was released as a commemoration of this. Four versions of the single were produced: a CD+DVD set in regular and first-print editions, and a CD-only release also in regular and first-print editions. A music video directed by Wataru Takeishi was produced for "Kimi ga Inai Mirai".

The lyrics of "Kimi ga Inai Mirai" include the song titles of the other three songs on the single.

== Track listing ==
No.	Title	Lyrics	Music	Length
1.	"Kimi ga Inai Mirai" (君がいない未来)	Kano Inoue, Kyasu Morizuki, Tomiko Van	Katsumi Ohnishi	4:21
2.	"Fukai Mori" (深い森)	Do As Infinity	Do As Infinity	4:05
3.	"Shinjitsu no Uta" (真実の詩)	Do As Infinity	Do As Infinity	4:15
4.	"Rakuen" (楽園)	Ryo Owatari	Do As Infinity	4:56

=== DVD ===
1. "Kimi ga Inai Mirai" (君がいない未来) (music clip)
2. "Fukai Mori" (深い森) (music clip)
3. "Shinjitsu no Uta" (真実の詩) (music clip)
4. "Rakuen" (楽園) (music clip)
5. "Kimi ga Inai Mirai" (君がいない未来) (anime opening video)
6. "Fukai Mori" (深い森) (anime ending video)
7. "Shinjitsu no Uta" (真実の詩) (anime ending video)

== Charts ==
Chart (2010)	Peak position	Sales
Japan Oricon	10	13,415
