= Hiiragi (disambiguation) =

Hiiragi is an evergreen shrub or small tree.

Hiiragi may also refer to:

- Hiiragi (song), a single by Do As Infinity, a Japanese band
- Hiiragi Magnetite, a Japanese musician
- Hiiragi (surname)
