= Be a Man =

Be a Man may refer to:

- Be a Man (Missile Innovation album), 2006
- Be a Man (Randy Savage album), 2003
- "Be a Man" (song), by Hole, 2000
- "Be a Man", a song by Aqua from Aquarium, 1997
- "Be a Man", a song by the Heptones
- "Be a Man", a song by Tesla from The Great Radio Controversy, 1989
- "Be a Man", a song by Tina Arena from Don't Ask, 1994

== See also ==
- Be a Man! Samurai School, a 2008 Japanese film
- "I'll Make a Man Out of You", a 1998 song from the film Mulan
- "Be the Man", a 1997 song by Celine Dion
- "Be the Man", a 2017 song by Rag'n'Bone Man from Human
