= True Song =

Studio album by Do As Infinity
- Released: December 26, 2002
- Genre: J-pop
- Length: 45:32
- Label: Avex Trax
- Producer: Dai Nagao / Seiji Kameda

Do As Infinity chronology
Do the Best (2002)	True Song (2002)	Do the Live (2003)

True Song is Do As Infinity's fourth album. It was released on December 26, 2002 under the Avex Records label.

== Album ==
The last song on this album, "Ai no Uta", has become a fan favorite and also a staple song to the end of all the Do As Infinity concerts after this album released.

Another staple song for their concerts was "One or Eight", which they usually do band member introductions in the middle of. "Kūsō Ryodan", according to Saiko Kawamura written in the Do the A-side booklet, is the song resembling Do As Infinity spirit. He stated that "...we are the fantasy brigade..." in the last sentence of the booklet which he penned.

== Track listing ==
All lyrics are written by D.A.I; all music is composed by D.A.I, arranged by Do As Infinity & Seiji Kameda

No.	Title	Length
1.	"Kūsō Ryodan (空想旅団; Fantasy Brigade)"	4:55
2.	"under the sun"	4:05
3.	"Good for you"	3:49
4.	"I can't be myself"	4:00
5.	"Perfect Lady"	3:39
6.	"Shinjitsu no Uta (真実の詩; Song of Truth)"	4:14
7.	"Grateful Journey"	4:15
8.	"One or Eight"	3:29
9.	"sense of life"	4:13
10.	"Wadachi (轍-WADACHI-; Rut)"	4:49
11.	"Ai no Uta (あいのうた; Song of Love)"	13:37

Hidden track on First Pressing
No.	Title	Length
12.	"Tōku Made (遠くまで; Far Away) ~3rd Anniversary Special Live ver.~"	4:08

== Chart positions ==
Chart (2002)	Peak position	Sales
Japan Oricon	5	272,291
