= Do the Best "Great Supporters Selection" =

Greatest hits album by Do As Infinity
- Released: March 15, 2006
- Genre: Rock
- Length: N/A
- Label: AVEX Trax
- Producer: Dai Nagao / Seiji Kameda

Do As Infinity chronology
Do the A-side (2006)	Do the Best "Great Supporters Selection" (2006)	Eternal Flame (2009)

Do the Best "Great Supporters Selection" is a fan-selected collection chosen through an online poll held by avex trax on Do As Infinity's official site after its disbanding. It was released among five other different Do As Infinity items on the same day. Fans were allowed to pick ten songs and a choice to leave comments; many fans from overseas also took part in the process, but only three comments from overseas fans were selected to be printed into the book, one each from Canada, United States, and Taiwan. All the names of the voters were printed in the book however. This two-disc album comprised thirty songs out of the eighty-six total Do As Infinity songs (not including any remixes or new arrangement mixes); surprisingly, not all of the band's A-sides were included in the album. The cover of the album lists the titles of the 86 songs that Do As Infinity has written so far in no particular order. There are no pictures of Do As Infinity included in the album at all.

== Track listing ==
=== Disc one ===
1. "Ai no Uta" (あいのうた, Song of Love) – 3:47
2. "Hi no Ataru Sakamichi" (陽のあたる坂道, Slope of the Sun) – 4:23
3. "Honjitsu wa Seiten Nari" (本日ハ晴天ナリ, Today we will have Fine Weather) – 3:17
4. "Summer Days" – 3:52
5. "Hiiragi" (柊, Holly) – 4:29
6. "Yesterday & Today" – 5:05
7. "Kagaku no Yoru" (科学の夜, Night of Chemistry) – 5:08
8. "We Are." – 4:25
9. "Enrai" (遠雷, Distant Thunder) – 3:43
10. "Oasis" – 4:43
11. "Boukensha Tachi" (冒険者たち, Adventurers) – 4:09
12. "Tōku Made" (遠くまで, Far Away) – 4:29
13. "Kūsō Ryōdan" (空想旅団, Fantasy Brigade) – 4:55
14. "I Miss You?" – 3:49
15. "Field of Dreams" – 4:56

=== Disc two ===
1. "Yotaka no Yume" (夜鷹の夢, Dream of the Nighthawk) – 4:50
2. "TAO" – 4:36
3. "Tadaima" (タダイマ, I'm Home) – 4:25
4. "Week!" – 4:19
5. "One or Eight" – 3:29
6. "New World" – 5:24
7. "Fukai Mori" (深い森, Deep Forest) – 4:08
8. "Under the Sun" – 4:07
9. "Shinjitsu no Uta" (真実の詩, Song of Truth) – 4:15
10. "Na no Hanabatake" (菜ノ花畑, Field of Vegetables) – 3:37
11. "Desire" – 4:30
12. "Tangerine Dream" – 4:19
13. "Nice & Easy" – 4:20
14. "Be Free" – 4:13
15. "Eien" (永遠, Eternity) – 4:47

== Chart positions ==
Chart (2006)	Peak position	Sales	Time in chart
Japan Oricon	26	16,000	2 weeks
