= Gates of Heaven (album) =

Studio album by Do As Infinity
- Released: November 27, 2003
- Genre: J-pop
- Length: 48:40
- Label: AVEX Trax
- Producer: Dai Nagao / Seiji Kameda

Do As Infinity chronology
| Do the Live (2003) | Gates of Heaven (2003) | Live in Japan (2004) |

Gates of Heaven is an album by Do As Infinity. It was released in 2003. "Azayaka na Hana" is one of the first songs Ryo Owatari wrote before auditioning for Do as Infinity, it was written for his former band, Peek-A-Boo! He also recorded a new version of the song with his new band Missile Innovation in their self-titled mini-album. The Asia version of the album included a Mandarin version of Shinjitsu no Uta as a bonus track.

== Track listing ==
All lyrics are written by D.A.I; all music is composed by D.A.I, arranged by Do As Infinity & Seiji Kameda

| No. | Title | Length |
|---|---|---|
| 1. | "Gates of heaven" | 4:08 |
| 2. | "Honjitsu wa Seiten Nari (本日ハ晴天ナリ; Today Will Be a Fine Day)" | 3:15 |
| 3. | "Hiiragi (柊; Holly)" | 4:29 |
| 4. | "Azayaka na Hana (アザヤカナハナ; Vivid Flower)" | 5:22 |
| 5. | "Mahou no Kotoba (魔法の言葉; Magic Words) ~Would You Marry Me?~" | 4:20 |
| 6. | "Buranko (ブランコ; Swing)" | 5:07 |
| 7. | "D/N/A" | 3:49 |
| 8. | "Weeds" | 4:24 |
| 9. | "Field of dreams" | 4:56 |
| 10. | "Kagaku no Yoru (科学の夜; Night of Science)" | 5:08 |
| 11. | "Thanksgiving Day" | 3:43 |

Secret/Bonus track on First Pressing
| No. | Title | Length |
|---|---|---|
| 12. | "Honjitsu wa Seiten Nari (本日ハ晴天ナリ; Today Will Be a Fine Day)" (a-nation 2003 Live ver.) | 3:28 |

== Chart positions ==
| Chart (2003) | Peak position | Sales | Time in chart |
|---|---|---|---|
| Japan Oricon | 3 | 293,835 | 16 weeks |
