= Minus V =

Compilation album by Do As Infinity
- Released: March 15, 2006
- Genre: Rock
- Label: Avex Trax
- Producer: Dai Nagao / Seiji Kameda

Do As Infinity chronology
Do the A-side (2006)	Minus V (2006)	Eternal Flame (2009)

Minus V is an instrumental collection by Do As Infinity released after its disbanding. It was released among five other different Do As Infinity items on the same day. This CD consists of mostly previously unreleased instrumental versions of Do As Infinity's songs. The "V" in name of the album is speculated to be the short for Tomiko Van, the lead singer of the band, or vocal because there aren't any of Tomiko Van's vocals in the CD.

== Track listing ==
1. "Yesterday & Today" – 5:04
2. "Break of Dawn" – 3:07
3. "Welcome!" – 3:42
4. "Fukai Mori" (深い森, Deep Forest) – 4:04
5. "Koi Otome" (恋妃, A Girl's Love) – 4:17
6. "Kūsō Ryōdan" (空想旅団, Fantasy Brigade) – 4:55
7. "Grateful Journey" – 4:18
8. "Hiiragi" (柊, Holly) – 4:31
9. "Buranko" (ブランコ, Swing) – 5:08
10. "Gates of Heaven" – 4:09
11. "Kagaku no Yoru" (科学の夜, Night of Science) – 5:05
12. "Thanksgiving Day" – 3:39
13. "Robot" – 3:30
14. "Need Your Love" – 4:48
15. "Na no Hanabatake" (菜ノ花畑, Rape Blossom Garden) – 3:29
16. "I Miss You?" – 3:48
17. "Enrai" (遠雷, Distant Thunder) – 3:41

== Chart positions ==
Chart (2006)	Peak position
Japan Oricon	141
