= Odoro yo Honey =

Single by Missile Innovation
- Released: February 1, 2006
- Genre: J-pop, Rock
- Length: 07 min 53 s
- Label: tearbridge records
- Songwriters: Ryo Owatari, Takashi Matsumoto
- Producer: Hiroaki Ito

Missile Innovation singles chronology
"Odoro yo Honey" (2006)	"Here We Go!" (2006)

"Odoro yo Honey" is Missile Innovation's debut single under the avex trax (tearbridge records) label. The single was released on February 1, 2006, and came in one format.

== Overview ==
"Odoro yo Honey" is Missile Innovation's debut single after Ryo Owatari's splitting up from Do As Infinity. The single failed to chart in the Daily Top 20 on the Japanese Oricon Charts, and even failed to chart in the Weekly Top 50.

The main song is described by many websites as a perfect song for Valentine's Day, which is fitting, since it was released only 13 days before the holiday.

== Cover ==
The cover of this single is a parody of the cover of Cream's final album, Goodbye.

== Track listing ==
1. "Odoro yo Honey (踊ろよハニー)" (Ryo Owatari) - 4:27
2. "Akai Sweet Pea (赤いスイートピー)" (Takashi Matsumoto, Karuho Kureta) - 3:25

== Personnel ==
- Ryo Owatari - vocals & guitars
- Hisayoshi Hayashi - drums & Chorus
- Yoshiyasu Hayashi - bass & Chorus
- Masato Minagawa - keyboards
- Yasuyuki Oguro - guitar technician

== Production ==
- A&R - Miki Kaneko
- Art direction & Design - Nao Sasaki
- Photographer - Takaaki Henmi
- Stylist - Tatsuhiko Marumoto
- Hair & Make - Ayano Hashimoto
- General Producer - Hiroaki Ito
- Executive Producer - Masato "max" Matsuura & Ryuhei Chiba
