= We Are. (Do As Infinity song) =

Single by Do As Infinity

from the album New World
- Released: November 29, 2000
- Genre: J-pop
- Length: 32:03
- Label: avex trax
- Songwriter: Dai Nagao
- Producers: Dai Nagao, 弦一徹, Seiji Kameda

Do As Infinity singles chronology
"Rumble Fish" (2000)	"We Are." (2000)	"Desire" (2001)

Music video
- "We Are." on YouTube

"We Are.", stylized as We are., is Do As Infinity's sixth single, released in 2000.

This song was included in the band's compilation albums Do the Best and Do the A-side.

== Track listing ==
1. "We Are."
2. "Eien" (永遠, Eternity)
3. "New World"
4. "Summer Days" (8.27 Live version)
5. "We Are." (Instrumental)
6. "Eien" (永遠, Eternity) (Instrumental)
7. "New World" (Instrumental)

== Chart positions ==
Chart (2000)	Peak position	Sales
Japan Oricon	16	54,300
