= Missile Innovation (album) =

Studio album by Missile Innovation
- Released: July 27, 2005
- Recorded: IRC2st
- Genre: Rock
- Length: 21:52
- Label: tearbridge records
- Producer: Hiroaki Ito, Masato "max" Matsuura, Ryuhei Chiba

Missile Innovation chronology
Missile Innovation (2005)	Be a man (2006)

"Missile Innovation" is the debut mini-album released by the band Missile Innovation, headed by Ryo Owatari, the former guitarist of Do As Infinity.

== Track listing ==
1. "Missile Innovation (ミサイルイノベーション)" (Ryo Owatari) – 4:12
2. "Manic Monday" (Prince R. Nelson) – 2:59
3. "Suna no Oshiro (砂のお城)" (Ryo Owatari) – 4:59
4. "Moroheiya Dandy (モロヘイヤダンディ)" (Ryo Owatari) – 4:45
5. "Azayaka na Hana (鮮やかな花)" (Ryo Owatari) – 4:56

Track listing information.

== Personnel ==
- Ryo Owatari - vocals & guitars
- Hisayoshi Hayashi - drums & Chorus
- Yoshiyasu Hayashi - bass & Chorus
- Akira Murata - keyboards & programming
- Yasuyuki Oguro - guitar technician

== Production ==
- Art Concept - Ryo Owatari & Hideto Oguri
- Illustration - Hideto Oguri
- Design - Ayako Kobayashi
- Photographer - Akiko Handa
- A&R - Miki Kaneko
- A&R Desk - Emiko Nagase
- General Producer - Hiroaki Ito
- Executive Producer - Masato "max" Matsuura & Ryuhei Chiba

== Charts ==
Oricon Sales Chart (Japan)

Release	Chart	Peak position
27 July 2005	Oricon Weekly Singles Chart	171
