= Cradle Orchestra =

Japanese jazz and hip hop band

- Origin: Japan
- Genres: Soul, R&B, Jazz
- Years active: 1996–present
- Label: Palette Sounds
- Members: Tomoki Seto, DJ Chika aka Inherit, Michitaro, Mochizuki Asuka, Aya Ishii, Anri

Cradle Orchestra is a Japanese Jazz/Hip Hop band which mixes live orchestral instrumentation with the flows of underground rappers. They have produced five albums.

== Discography ==
- 2006: Attitude
- 2009: Velvet Ballads
- 2009: Aurora Collection
- 2010: Soulbirds (feat Nieve & Jean)
- 2010: Transcended Elements
- 2014: Wherever to (with Giovanca)
- 2018: Best of Golden Works - Music is the answer
