= Live Tour 2001: Deep Forest =

Video by Do As Infinity
- Released: March 20, 2002
- Genre: Rock
- Length: 110 minutes
- Label: AVEX Trax

Do As Infinity chronology
Live Tour 2001: Deep Forest (2002)	Live in Japan (2004)

Live Tour 2001: Deep Forest is the name of Do As Infinity's first concert DVD. It was recorded on December the 4th 2001 and released on March 20, 2002. The concert was held at Shibuya Kokaido.

== Track listing ==
1. "Kouzou Kaikaku" (構造改革, Structural Reform)
2. "Shigunaru" (シグナル, Signal)
3. "Get yourself"
4. "Desire"
5. "Tadaima" (タダイマ, I'm Home)
6. "Tsubasa no Keikaku" (翼の計画, Plans of Wings)
7. "Koi Otome" (恋妃, A Girl's Love)
8. "Snail"
9. "Painful"
10. "Tangerine Dream"
11. "Fukai Mori" (深い森, Deep Forest)
12. "Enrai" (遠雷, Distant Thunder)
13. "Yesterday & Today"
14. "Tooku Made" (遠くまで, Far Away)
15. "Boukensha tachi" (冒険者たち, Adventure)
16. "135"
17. "Summer Days"
18. "Week!"
19. "Tsurezure naru Mama ni (徒然なるままに, At Your Own Pace)
20. "We are."
