= Chikai (Do As Infinity song) =

Single by Do As Infinity
- Released: July 27, 2011
- Genre: J-pop
- Length: 4:25
- Label: Avex Trax
- Songwriter: Kyasu Morizuki
- Producer: Seiji Kameda

Do As Infinity singles chronology
"Jidaishin" (2010)	"Chikai" (2011)	"Ariadne no Ito" (2011)

Music video
- "Chikai" on YouTube

"Chikai" (誓い; "Oath") is the 25th single by Japanese band Do As Infinity, released on July 27, 2011. This is the first single released after the album Eight, and it was released in two formats. The CD-only version contains the title track plus three live versions of songs featured on Eight. These live versions were sung at the concert "Do As Infinity Live Tour 2011: Eight", recorded at Osaka Namba Hatch on May 15, 2011. The main song, "Chikai", was announced to be used as theme song for a PlayStation Portable game named Sengoku Basara Chronicle Heroes, distributed by Capcom. The CD+DVD version comes with a music video for "Chikai" and an original video of Sengoku Basara.

== Track listing ==
No.	Title	Lyrics	Music	Length
1.	"Chikai" (誓い Oath)	Kyasu Morizuki	Katsumi Ohnishi	4:25
2.	"Baby! Baby! Baby! (from Live Tour 2011: Eight)"	Masanori Ouchi	Shoichiro Hirata	3:59
3.	"Special (from Live Tour 2011: Eight)"	Ryo Owatari	Stil	3:51
4.	"Hand in Hand (from Live Tour 2011: Eight)"	Ryo Owatari, Tomiko Van	Ryo Owatari	5:04

== Charts ==
Chart (2011)	Peak position
Japan Oricon Weekly Singles	28
