= Break of Dawn (Do As Infinity album) =

2000 album by Do As Infinity

Studio album by Do As Infinity
- Released: March 23, 2000
- Genre: J-pop
- Length: 47:28
- Label: Avex Trax
- Producer: Dai Nagao / Seiji Kameda

Do As Infinity chronology
Break of Dawn (2000)	New World (2001)

Singles from Break of Dawn
- 1. "Tangerine Dream" Released: September 29, 1999; 2. "Heart" Released: December 8, 1999; 3. "Oasis" Released: January 26, 2000; 4. "Yesterday & Today" Released: February 23, 2000

Break of Dawn is the debut album by Do As Infinity, released on March 23, 2000. The cover of this album is the only one by the group where Dai Nagao, under alias D.A.I., is included in along with the other two members. Both "Yesterday & Today" and "Raven" were used as the theme song for Fuji TV drama Nisennen no Koi and horror film Uzumaki respectively.

== Track listing ==
All lyrics are written by Dai Nagao; all music is composed by Dai Nagao and arranged by Do As Infinity & Seiji Kameda.

No.	Title	Length
1.	"Break of Dawn"	3:05
2.	"Standing on the hill"	4:48
3.	"Oasis"	4:44
4.	"Another"	4:29
5.	"Kokoro no Chizu (心の地図; Map of the Heart)"	5:10
6.	"Heart"	4:11
7.	"Raven"	4:01
8.	"Welcome!"	3:08
9.	"Painful"	4:33
10.	"Tangerine Dream"	4:18
11.	"Yesterday & Today"	5:01

Bonus tracks in limited edition
No.	Title	Length
12.	"Chiriyuku Yūbe (散りゆく夕辺; Dying Night)" (Acoustic version)
13.	"Oasis" (Acoustic version)

== Charts ==
=== Weekly charts ===
Weekly chart performance for Break of Dawn
Chart (2000)	Peak position
Japan (Oricon)	3
