= Oasis (Do As Infinity song) =

2000 single by Do As Infinity

Single by Do As Infinity

from the album Break of Dawn
- Released: January 26, 2000
- Genre: J-pop
- Length: 32:07
- Label: avex trax
- Songwriter: Dai Nagao
- Producer: Dai Nagao / Seiji Kameda

Do As Infinity singles chronology
"Heart" (1999)	"Oasis" (2000)	"Yesterday & Today" (2000)

Music video
- "Oasis" on YouTube

"Oasis" is Do As Infinity's third single, released in 2000. The song was used in a commercial for Kanebo's"T'ESTIMO" cosmetics line.

It was included in the band's compilation albums Do the Best and Do the A-side.

== Track listing ==
1. "Oasis"
2. "Sell..."
3. "Oasis" (Instrumental)
4. "Sell..." (Instrumental)
5. "Wings" (Free Live 100 at Shibuya Public Hall)
6. "Heart" (3SV Remix)
7. "Heart" (Chromatic Mix)

== Charts ==
Chart (2000)	Peak position	Sales
Japan Oricon	25	76,600
