= 5 (Do As Infinity video) =

Video by Do As Infinity
- Released: September 27, 2001
- Genre: J-pop
- Label: avex trax

Do As Infinity chronology
9 (2001)	5 (2001)	THE CLIP SELECTION (2002)

5 is Do As Infinity's second video collection. The last theme is a recording of Do As Infinity sitting with the five directors of the music videos at a Chinese restaurant; it was not made to be a music video.

== Video track listing ==
1. "Tōku Made" (遠くまで)
2. "Week!"
3. "Fukai Mori" (深い森, Deep Forest)
4. "Boukensha Tachi" (冒険者たち, Adventurers)
5. "Enrai" (遠雷, Distant Thunder)
6. "Signal" (シグナル, Shigunaru) (Album Remix)
