= The Clip Selection =

Video by Do As Infinity
- Released: December 11, 2002
- Genre: J-pop
- Length: ~42:00
- Label: avex trax

Do As Infinity chronology
5 (2001)	The Clip Selection (2002)	8 (2004)

The Clip Selection is Do As Infinity's third video collection.

== Track listing ==
1. "Tangerine Dream"
2. "Heart"
3. "Oasis"
4. "Yesterday & Today"
5. "Rumble Fish"
6. "We Are."
7. "Desire"
8. "Week!"
9. "Fukai Mori" (深い森)
10. "Shinjitsu no Uta" (真実の詩) (Propaganda Clip)
