= Infinity 2 =

"∞2"

Single by Do As Infinity

from the album Eight
- Released: June 16, 2010
- Genre: J-pop
- Length: 16:56
- Label: Avex Trax
- Songwriter(s): Kenn Kato, Psycho Kawamura, Koshin, Shohei Ohi, Katsumi Ohnishi, Ryo Owatari, Fumiyasu Sueoka, Tomiko Van
- Producer(s): Seiji Kameda

Do As Infinity singles chronology
"Kimi ga Inai Mirai" (2010)	"∞2" (2010)	"Jidaishin" (2010)

"∞2" (read "Infinity Ni"; translated as "Infinity 2") is Do As Infinity's 23rd single, released on June 16, 2010. The single is the second in the "Infinity" series, after Do As Infinity's 21st single "∞1" (2009). Like "∞1", "∞2" contains four songs with none named after the single itself. Between September 1 and October 31, 2009, the second installment of a contest called Do! Creative!! was held to give Do As Infinity fans a chance to compose songs that the band would later perform. Of the songs received, two were selected to be placed on "∞2": "Everything Will Be All Right" composed by Shohei Ohi, and "Haruka" composed by Fumiyasu Sueoka. A music video was produced for "1/100" directed by A.T. "1/100" and "Everything Will Be All Right" were used as promotional theme songs for professional Kyōtei boat racing in 2010. "Pile Driver" was used as a promotional theme song for Hiroshima University of Economics in 2010.

== Track listing ==
No.	Title	Lyrics	Music	Length
1.	"1/100"	Ryo Owatari	Katsumi Ohnishi	3:45
2.	"Everything Will Be All Right"	Tomiko Van	Shohei Ohi	4:59
3.	"Haruka"	Kenn Kato	Fumiyasu Sueoka	4:32
4.	"Pile Driver" (パイルドライバー Pairu Doraibā)	Psycho Kawamura	Koshin	3:40

== Charts ==
Chart (2010)	Peak position
Japan Oricon Weekly Singles	13
