= Do the B-side =

Compilation album by Do As Infinity
- Released: September 23, 2004
- Genre: J-pop
- Length: 53:27
- Label: AVEX Trax
- Producer: Dai Nagao / Seiji Kameda

Do As Infinity chronology
Do the Best + DVD (2004)	Do the B-side (2004)	Need Your Love (2005)

Do the B-side is the eighth album from the popular Japanese band Do As Infinity. A limited edition of this album was released with an original T-shirt celebrating the fifth anniversary of the band. Footage of the concert is found in the Do As Infinity Live Year 2004 DVD. This B-side compilation album was released on September 23, 2004, under the AVEX Records label.

In the Taiwanese version of the limited version of Do The B-Side, the two CDs contained the opposite tracks from each other. This is not the first defect that the Taiwanese branch of Avex has made; other artists have made mistakes with the Taiwanese versions of their products as well.

== Track listing ==
All lyrics are written by D.A.I; all music is composed by D.A.I, arranged by Do As Infinity & Seiji Kameda.

Disc1: Album
No.	Title	Length
1.	"Wings" (Strong Mix)	4:03
2.	"Sariyuku Yūbe (散り行く夕辺; Dying Night)"	3:50
3.	"Sell..."	4:21
4.	"Glasses"	3:46
5.	"My Wish - My Life"	4:46
6.	"Carnaval"	4:28
7.	"Shigunaru (シグナル; Signal)"	3:56
8.	"Tsurezure Naru Mama Ni (徒然なるままに; With Tedium And Boredom At My Side)"	3:41
9.	"Remember the Hill?"	5:13
10.	"What You Gonna Do?"	3:54
11.	"Mellow Amber"	4:22
12.	"10W40"	3:53
13.	"Treasure Pleasure (トレジャプレジャ; Toreja Pureja)"	3:10

Disc2: Bonus track on First Pressing
No.	Title	Lyrics	Music	Arranger(s)	Length
1.	"BE FREE"	Ryo Owatari	D.A.I	D.A.I & Seiji Kameda	4:13

== Chart positions ==
Chart (2004)	Peak position	Sales	Time in chart
Japan Oricon	7	49,000	8 weeks
