= New World (Do As Infinity album) =

Studio album by Do As Infinity
- Released: February 21, 2001
- Genre: J-pop
- Length: 53:40
- Label: Avex Trax
- Producer: Dai Nagao / Seiji Kameda

Do As Infinity chronology
Break of Dawn (2000)	New World (2001)	Deep Forest (2001)

New World is the second album by Do As Infinity, released 2001.

== Track listing ==
All lyrics are written by D.A.I; all music is composed by D.A.I, arranged by Do As Infinity & Seiji Kameda

No.	Title	Length
1.	"new world" (Album Mix)	5:24
2.	"GURUGURU (Round and Round)"	4:16
3.	"Desire"	4:28
4.	"We are."	4:25
5.	"Snail"	5:02
6.	"Eien (永遠; Eternity)"	4:47
7.	"rumble fish"	4:07
8.	"Holiday"	3:24
9.	"135"	4:29
10.	"Wings 510"	4:41
11.	"SUMMER DAYS"	3:52

Bonus tracks in limited edition
No.	Title	Length
12.	"Yesterday & Today" (Strings Version)	4:35

== Chart positions ==
Chart (2001)	Peak position	Sales
Japan Oricon	1	353,660
