= Be a Man (Missile Innovation album) =

Studio album by Missile Innovation
- Released: July 5, 2006
- Genre: Rock
- Length: 42:14
- Label: Tearbridge Records

Missile Innovation chronology
Missile Innovation (2005)	Be a Man (2006)

Be a Man is the debut album released by Japanese band Missile Innovation.

== Track listing ==
All words and music by Ryo Owatari. All songs arranged by Missile Innovation, and with Seiji Kameda on Track 3.

1. "SUPABADD" – 4:04
2. "Here we go!" – 4:05
3. "Odoro yo HONEY (踊ろよハニー; Let's dance, honey!)" – 4:27
4. "Be a man" – 4:30
5. "Asobiniikou yo (遊びに行こうよ; Let's go on a trip!)" – 4:13
6. "Flying high" – 3:45
7. "777" – 4:47
8. "Fit" – 3:36
9. "HITORIGOTO (ヒトリゴト; Soliloquy)" – 5:01
10. "JUICY na Hibi (ジューシーな日々; Juicy Days)" – 3:46

== Personnel ==
- Ryo Owatari - vocals & guitars
- Hisayoshi Hayashi - drums & chorus
- Yoshiyasu Hayashi - bass & chorus
