= 8 (Do As Infinity video) =

Video by Do As Infinity
- Released: January 7, 2004
- Genre: J-pop
- Length: ~50:00
- Label: avex trax

Do As Infinity chronology
The Clip Selection (2002)	8 (2004)	Do As Infinity Live in Japan (2004)

8 is Do As Infinity's fourth video collection.

== Video track listing ==
1. "Hi no Ataru Sakamichi" (陽のあたる坂道)
2. "Under the Sun"
3. "Under the Moon"
4. "Shinjitsu no Uta" (真実の詩)
5. "Mahou no Kotoba ~Would you marry me?~" (魔法の言葉 ～Would you marry me？～)
6. "Honjitsu wa Seiten Nari" (本日ハ晴天ナリ)
7. "Hiiragi" (柊)
8. "Buranko" (ブランコ)
9. "Buranko" ~Another Side Story~ (ブランコ ～Another Side Story～)
10. "Field of Dreams" (bonus clip)
