= Hi no Ataru Sakamichi =

Single by Do As Infinity

from the album Do the Best
- Released: February 27, 2002
- Genre: J-pop
- Length: 16:36
- Label: avex trax
- Songwriter: Dai Nagao
- Producers: Dai Nagao, Seiji Kameda

Do As Infinity singles chronology
"Bōkenshatachi" (2001)	"Hi no Ataru Sakamichi" (2002)	"Under the Sun / Under the Moon" (2002)

Music video
- "Hi no Ataru Sakamichi" on YouTube

"Hi no Ataru Sakamichi" (陽のあたる坂道) is the twelfth single by Do As Infinity, released in 2002. It was used as the theme song for the drama Hatsutaiken.

This song was included in the band's compilation album Do the A-side.

== Track listing ==
1. "Hi no Ataru Sakamichi" (陽のあたる坂道, Sunny Hill)
2. "What You Gonna Do?"
3. "Hi no Ataru Sakamichi" (陽のあたる坂道, Sunny Hill) (Instrumental)
4. "What You Gonna Do?" (Instrumental)

== Charts ==
Chart (2002)	Peak position	Sales
Japan Oricon	5	126,000
