= Rumble Fish (song) =

Single by Do As Infinity

from the album New World
- Released: August 2, 2000
- Genre: J-pop
- Length: 32:10
- Label: avex trax
- Songwriter: Dai Nagao
- Producers: Dai Nagao, Seiji Kameda

Do As Infinity singles chronology
"Yesterday & Today" (2000)	"Rumble Fish" (2000)	"We Are." (2000)

Music video
- "Rumble Fish" on YouTube

"Rumble Fish" (stylized at "rumble fish") is Do As Infinity's fifth single, released in 2000. According to the Do the A-side booklet, "Summer Days" was originally going to be used as the title track for the single but "Rumble Fish" was used for an unexplained reason which also says that the single's jacket was shot in Taiwan during their visit in 2000.

This song was included in the band's compilation album Do the A-side.

== Track listing ==
1. "Rumble Fish"
2. "My Wish-My Life"
3. "Summer Days"
4. "Rumble Fish" (Instrumental)
5. "My Wish-My Life" (Instrumental)
6. "Summer Days" (Instrumental)
7. "Welcome!" (Dub's Re-fresh Mix)

== Charts ==
Chart (2000)	Peak position	Sales
Japan Oricon	20	37,000
