= Hiiragi (song) =

Single by Do As Infinity

from the album Gates of Heaven
- Released: November 6, 2003
- Genre: J-pop
- Length: 15:26
- Label: avex trax
- Songwriter: Dai Nagao
- Producers: Dai Nagao, Seiji Kameda

Do As Infinity singles chronology
"Honjitsu wa Seiten Nari" (2003)	"Hiiragi" (2003)	"Rakuen" (2004)

Music video
- "Hiiragi" on YouTube

"Hiiragi" (柊) is Do As Infinity's seventeenth single, released in 2003. It was used in the drama Koibumi: Watashitachi ga Aishite Otoko.

This song was included in the band's compilation album Do the A-side.

== Track listing ==
1. "Hiiragi" (柊, Holly)
2. "Treasure Pleasure" (トレジャプレジャ, Toreja Pureja)
3. "Hiiragi" (柊, Holly) (Instrumental)
4. "Treasure Pleasure" (トレジャプレジャ, Toreja Pureja) (Instrumental)

== Charts ==
Chart (2003)	Peak position	Sales
Japan Oricon Singles Chart	7	149,300
