= Desire (Do As Infinity song) =

Single by Do As Infinity

from the album New World
- Released: January 24, 2001
- Genre: J-pop
- Length: 29:21
- Label: avex trax
- Songwriter: Dai Nagao
- Producers: Dai Nagao, Seiji Kameda

Do As Infinity singles chronology
"We Are." (2000)	"Desire" (2001)	"Tōku Made" (2001)

Music video
- "Desire" on YouTube

"Desire" is the seventh single by the Japanese pop and rock band Do As Infinity, released in 2001. "Desire" and "Carnaval" are almost the same songs but "Carnaval" was meant to be written from a male perspective while "Desire" described a female perspective in the lyrics. This single is the last by Do As Infinity to include a remix.

This song was included in the band's compilation albums Do the Best and Do the A-side.

== Track listing ==
1. "Desire"
2. "Holiday"
3. "Carnaval"
4. "Faces" (3SVRemix)
5. "Desire" (Instrumental)
6. "Holiday" (Instrumental)
7. "Carnaval" (Instrumental)

== Charts ==
Chart (2001)	Peak position	Sales
Japan Oricon singles chart	8	145,400
