= For the Future (song) =

Single by Do As Infinity

from the album Need Your Love
- Released: January 19, 2005
- Genre: J-pop
- Length: 4:22
- Label: avex trax
- Songwriters: Dai Nagao, Ryo Owatari
- Producers: Dai Nagao, Seiji Kameda

Do As Infinity singles chronology
"Rakuen" (2004)	"For the Future" (2005)	"Tao" (2005)

Music video
- "For the Future" on YouTube

"For the Future" is Do As Infinity's 19th single, released in January 2005 on Avex Records. It was the second single to be released from the group's sixth studio album, Need Your Love. The song spent six weeks on the Oricon singles charts, and peaked at No. 6, selling almost 40,000 copies.

Ryo Owatari stated in an interview "I had the image from the time of recording that it would have a very positive message, and I wanted to write a message that would make the audience enjoy it even more live."

It was also used as the theme song for the Japanese television series Sports Urugusu. This song was included in the band's compilation album Do the A-side.

== Track listing ==
1. "For the Future" - 4;22
2. "For the Future" (Instrumental) - 4:21

== Charts ==
Chart (2005)	Peak position	Sales
Japan Oricon	6	39,600
