= 9 (Do As Infinity video) =

Video by Do As Infinity
- Released: March 7, 2001
- Genre: J-pop
- Length: ~62:00
- Label: avex trax

Do As Infinity chronology
9 (2001)	5 (2001)

9 is Do As Infinity's first video clip collection.

== Video track listing ==
1. "Tangerine Dream"
2. "Heart"
3. "Oasis"
4. "Yesterday & Today"
5. "Raven"
6. "Welcome!"
7. "Rumble Fish"
8. "We Are."
9. "Desire"
