= Alive (Do As Infinity album) =

2018 studio album by Do As Infinity

Studio album by Do As Infinity
- Released: February 28, 2018
- Genre: J-pop
- Length: 37:40
- Label: Avex Trax
- Producer: Hiroyuki Sawano

Do As Infinity chronology
Brand New Days (2015)	Alive (2018)

Singles from Alive
- 1. "Alive" Released: June 28, 2017; 2. "Iron Hornet" Released: June 28, 2017; 3. "To Know You" Released: September 27, 2017; 4. "Keshin no Juu" Released: December 6, 2017

Alive is the twelfth studio album by Japanese band Do As Infinity, released on February 28, 2018. All the songs in the album were produced by Hiroyuki Sawano. Three singles were released in 2017. The song "Keshin no Juu" was used as the ending theme song for the anime Juni Taisen: Zodiac War. Three different editions of the album were released: a regular CD version, a CD+DVD, and a CD+Blu-ray limited edition.

== Track listing ==
All music composed and arranged by Hiroyuki Sawano.

No.	Title	Lyrics	Length
1.	"~ prologue ~"		2:09
2.	"Alive"	Mio Aoyama	4:22
3.	"GET OVER IT"	Ryo Owatari	3:41
4.	"Hi no Tori" (火の鳥)	Tomiko Van	4:30
5.	"To Know You"	Benjamin; mpi	3:51
6.	"Iron Hornet"	Benjamin; mpi	4:00
7.	"Silver Moon"	Benjamin; mpi	4:17
8.	"Keshin no Juu" (化身の獣)	Tomiko Van	3:25
9.	"Yuiitsu no Shinjitsu" (唯一の真実)	Tomiko Van	4:42
10.	"~ epilogue ~"		2:43

== Charts ==
Chart (2018)	Peak position
Japan Oricon Weekly Albums	30
