= Mahou no Kotoba (Would You Marry Me?) =

Single by Do As Infinity

from the album Gates of Heaven
- Released: June 11, 2003
- Genre: J-pop
- Length: 17:31
- Label: Avex Trax
- Songwriter: Dai Nagao
- Producers: Dai Nagao, Seiji Kameda

Do As Infinity singles chronology
"Shinjitsu no Uta" (2002)	"Mahou no Kotoba (Would You Marry Me?)" (2003)	"Honjitsu wa Seiten Nari" (2003)

Music video
- "Mahou no Kotoba (Would You Marry Me?)" on YouTube

"Mahou no Kotoba (Would You Marry Me?)" is the fifteenth single by Do As Infinity, released in 2003. Two versions of the single were released, a limited CD+DVD edition and a normal CD edition, each version with a different cover. It was used as the theme song for the 2003 Japanese drama Chocolat. Due to the extremely high popularity and marriage based theme of the A-side track "Mahou no Kotoba (Would You Marry Me?)", the song became one of the most requested wedding songs in Japan.

This song was included in the band's compilation albums Do the A-side.

== Track listing ==
1. "Mahou no Kotoba (Would You Marry Me?)"
2. "Mellow Amber"
3. "Mahou no Kotoba (Would You Marry Me?)" (Instrumental)
4. "Mellow Amber" (Instrumental)

== Charts ==
Chart (2003)	Peak position	Sales
Japan Oricon	4	64,500
