= Week (Do As Infinity song) =

"Week!"

Single by Do As Infinity

from the album Deep Forest
- Released: May 30, 2001
- Genre: J-pop
- Length: 13:51
- Label: avex trax
- Songwriter: Dai Nagao
- Producers: Dai Nagao, Seiji Kameda

Do As Infinity singles chronology
"Tōku Made" (2001)	"Week!" (2001)	"Fukai Mori" (2001)

Music video
- "Week!" on YouTube

"Week!" is the ninth single by Do As Infinity, released in 2001. The B-side, "Tsuredzure Naru Mama ni", is the only studio-recorded song by the guitarist Ryo Owatari, who also wrote the lyrics. The melody parallels that of song "Yesterday & Today". It was used as the theme song for the drama Yome wa Mitsuboshi.

This song was included in the band's compilation albums Do the Best and Do the A-side.

== Track listing ==
1. "Week!"
2. "Tsurezure Naru Mama ni" (徒然なるままに, With Tedium And Boredom At My Side)
3. "Week!" (Instrumental)
4. "Tsurezure Naru Mama ni" (徒然なるままに, With Tedium And Boredom At My Side) (Instrumental)

== Charts ==
Chart (2001)	Peak position	Sales
Japan Oricon Singles Chart	8	72,900
