= Deep Forest (Do As Infinity album) =

Studio album by Do As Infinity
- Released: September 19, 2001
- Genre: J-pop
- Length: 50:43
- Label: AVEX Trax
- Producer: Dai Nagao / Seiji Kameda

Do As Infinity chronology
New World (2001)	Deep Forest (2001)	Do the Best (2002)

Deep Forest is an album by Do As Infinity which was released in 2001.

== Track listing ==
All lyrics are written by D.A.I; all music is composed by D.A.I, arranged by Do As Infinity & Seiji Kameda.

No.	Title	Length
1.	"Fukai Mori (深い森; Deep Forest)"	4:05
2.	"Tōku Made (遠くまで; Far Away)"	4:16
3.	"Tadaima (タダイマ; I'm Home)"	4:29
4.	"Get yourself"	3:39
5.	"Tsubasa no Keikaku (翼の計画; Plan for Wings)"	4:07
6.	"Kōzō Kaikaku (構造改革; New Foundation)"	3:34
7.	"Koi Otome (恋妃; A Girl's Love)"	4:17
8.	"Week!"	4:16
9.	"Hang out"	4:03
10.	"Bōkenshatachi (冒険者たち; Adventurers)"	4:04
11.	"Enrai (遠雷; Distant Thunder)"	3:43

Bonus Track on First Pressing
No.	Title	Length
12.	"Shigunaru (シグナル; Signal)" (Album Remix)	6:25

== Chart positions ==
Chart (2001)	Peak position	Sales	Time in chart
Japan Oricon	1	609,290	11 weeks
