= Jidaishin =

Single by Do As Infinity

from the album Eight
- Released: September 29, 2010
- Genre: J-pop
- Length: 3:56
- Label: Avex Trax
- Songwriter(s): Kazunori Watanabe
- Producer(s): Seiji Kameda

Do As Infinity singles chronology
"∞2" (2010)	"Jidaishin" (2010)	"Chikai" (2011)

"Jidaishin" is Do As Infinity's 24th single, released on September 29, 2010. It was released on the band's 11th anniversary and was sold only at the mu-mo website in Japan. This single was offered in two different ways, both with special boxes that brought the CD plus some personalized face and body towels. It contains two tracks: the single and its instrumental version. It was composed by Kazunori Watanabe. The same day Do As Infinity released the single, there was a free concert, aired on the Nico Nico Douga website for its promotion.

== Track listing ==
All tracks are written by Kazunori Watanabe

No.	Title	Length
1.	"Jidaishin"	3:56
2.	"Jidaishin (Instrumental)"	3:56
