= Live Year 2004 =

Video by Do As Infinity
- Released: March 02, 2005
- Genre: Rock
- Label: Avex Trax

Do As Infinity chronology
Live in Japan (2004)	Live Year 2004 (2005)	Live in Japan II (2005)

Live Year 2004 is the third Live DVD released by the Japanese band Do As Infinity. The DVD contains concerts which were held at Dallas (2004-06-04), New York (2004-06-07), Hibiya Kokaido (2004-9-23), Osaka Yagai Ongakudo (2004-09-26) and Shibuya (2004-09-29).

== Track list ==
Recorded on 2004-06-04 Dallas / 2004-06-07 New York:

1. Dallas off shot
2. New York off shot 1
3. Fukai Mori (深い森)
4. New York off shot 2

Recorded on 2004-09-23 Hibiya Kokaido / 2004-09-26 Osaka Yagai Ongakudo:

1. Osaka Yagai Ongakudo off shot
2. Break of Dawn
3. Mellow Amber
4. Wings
5. MC
6. Nice & Easy
7. MC
8. Enrai (遠雷)
9. We are.
10. Kagaku no Yoru (科学の夜)
11. Tooku Made (遠くまで)
12. Boukensha tachi (冒険者たち)
13. Call & Response
14. One or Eight

Recorded on 2004-09-29 Duo Music Exchange:

1. Shibuya Duo off shot
2. Summer Days
3. Under the Sun
4. Tsubasa no Keikaku (翼の計画)
5. MC
6. BE FREE
7. Rumble Fish
8. Mahou no Kotoba ~Would You Marry Me?~ (魔法の言葉)
9. Signal (シグナル)
10. Honjitsu wa Seiten Nari (本日ハ晴天ナリ)
11. Tsurezure naru Mama ni (徒然なるままに)
12. Happy Birthday
13. Ai no Uta (あいのうた)
