= Under the Sun / Under the Moon =

Single by Do As Infinity

from the album True Song and Do the A-side
- Released: July 31, 2002
- Genre: J-pop
- Length: 17:07
- Label: Avex Trax
- Songwriter: Dai Nagao
- Producers: Dai Nagao, Seiji Kameda

Do As Infinity singles chronology
"Hi no Ataru Sakamichi" (2002)	"Under the Sun / Under the Moon" (2002)	"Shinjitsu no Uta" (2002)

Music video
- "Under the Sun" on YouTube "Under the Moon" on YouTube

"Under the Sun" and "Under the Moon" are songs on the double-A side thirteenth single by Do As Infinity, released in 2002. The second A-side of this single, "Under the Moon", which is an extension song to "Under the Sun", was not included in the True Song album. The song "Under the Sun" was used in games and anime, and included on the Do As Infinity Anime and Game Collection compilation album (2015). Both songs were written by guitarist Dai Nagao who also wrote many of the band's hit songs, including Yō no ataru sakamichi and Shinjitsu no uta. The song "Under the Sun" is sung in Japanese with English phrases. The lyrics begin: "'I walk under the sun 太陽とダンス 変わってく, 予感 いいんじゃない？ (Taiyō to dansu kawatte ku, yokan īn'janai?)".

== Track listing ==
1. "Under the Sun"
2. "Under the Moon"
3. "Under the Sun" (instrumental)
4. "Under the Moon" (instrumental)

== Charts ==
Chart (2002)	Peak position	Sales
Japan Oricon	5	63,600
