= Hiiragi (surname) =

Hiiragi (written: 柊) is a Japanese surname. Notable people with the surname include:

- Aoi Hiiragi (柊 あおい; born 1962), Japanese manga artist
- Hinata Hiiragi (柊木 陽太; born 2011), Japanese actor
- Rumi Hiiragi (柊 瑠美; born 1987), Japanese actress
- Sanaka Hiiragi (柊 サナカ; born 1974), Japanese writer

== Fictional characters ==
- Kashima Hiiragi (鹿島柊), a character from Given
- Akira Hiragi (柊 晶), a character from Valkyrie Drive
- Alice Hiiragi (柊 アリス), a character from Persona 5 Strikers
- Asuka Hiiragi (柊 明日香), the main female protagonist in the role-playing video game Tokyo Xanadu
- Chisato Hiiragi (柊 千里), a non-playable character in Genshin Impact
- Kagami Hiiragi (柊 かがみ) and Tsukasa Hiiragi (柊 つかさ), major characters in the manga series Lucky Star, and their family:
  - Inori Hiiragi (柊 いのり), their oldest sister
  - Matsuri Hiiragi (柊 まつり), their older sister
  - Miki Hiiragi (柊 みき), their mother
  - Tadao Hiiragi (柊 ただお), their father
- Kappei Hiiragi (柊 勝平), a character from the visual novel Clannad
- The Hiiragi family from the novel series Seraph of the End:
  - Kureto Hiiragi (柊 暮人)
  - Mahiru Hiiragi (柊 真昼)
  - Seishirou Hiiragi (柊 征志郎)
  - Shinoa Hiiragi (柊 シノア)
  - Shinya Hiiragi (柊 深夜)
  - Tenri Hiiragi (柊 天理)
- Yuzu Hiiragi (柊 柚子), a character from the manga/anime series Yu-Gi-Oh! Arc-V, known as Zuzu Boyle in the dub.
