= Heart (Do As Infinity song) =

Single by Do As Infinity

from the album Break of Dawn
- Released: December 8, 1999
- Genre: J-pop
- Length: 41:03
- Label: avex trax
- Songwriter: Dai Nagao
- Producer: Dai Nagao

Do As Infinity singles chronology
"Tangerine Dream" (1999)	"Heart" (1999)	"Oasis" (2000)

Music video
- "Heart" on YouTube

"Heart" is Do As Infinity's second single, and the first of four singles with remixes, released in 1999.

The song was included in the band's compilation albums Do the Best and Do the A-side.

== Track listing ==
1. "Heart"
2. "Sariyuku Yūbe" (散りゆく夕辺, Dying Night)
3. "Heart" (Instrumental)
4. "Sariyuku Yūbe" (Instrumental) (散りゆく夕辺, Dying Night)
5. "Heart" (Keith Litman's Heart Head Remix)
6. "Tangerine Dream" (RAZOR N'GUIDO Remix)
7. "Tangerine Dream" (Dub's keep on Remix)

== Charts ==
Chart (1999)	Peak position	Sales
Japan Oricon	56	7,000
