= Eight (Do As Infinity album) =

- Cover of the CD+DVD edition of Eight

Studio album by Do As Infinity
- Released: January 19, 2011
- Genre: J-pop
- Length: 51:47
- Label: Avex Trax
- Producer: Seiji Kameda

Do As Infinity chronology
Eternal Flame (2009)	Eight (2011)	Time Machine (2012)

CD edition

Singles from Eight
- 1. "Kimi ga Inai Mirai" Released: January 20, 2010; 2. "1/100" Released: June 16, 2010; 3. "Everything Will Be All Right" Released: June 16, 2010; 4. "Jidaishin" Released: September 29, 2010

Eight is the eighth studio album by Japanese band Do As Infinity, released on January 19, 2011. Of the twelve music tracks on the album, four were previously released on three of Do As Infinity's singles. Two different editions of the album were released: a regular CD version and a CD+DVD limited edition. The DVD contained music videos for three songs and a short documentary.

Between September 1 and October 31, 2009, the second installment of a contest called Do! Creative!! was held to give Do As Infinity fans a chance to compose songs that the band would later perform. Of the songs received, "Everything Will Be All Right" composed by Shohei Ohi was selected to be placed on Eight.

== Track listing ==
All music arranged by Seiji Kameda.

No.	Title	Lyrics	Music	Length
1.	"Baby! Baby! Baby!"	Masanori Ouchi	Shoichiro Hirata	3:51
2.	"Special"	Ryo Owatari	Stil	3:48
3.	"1/100"	Ryo Owatari	Katsumi Ohnishi	3:44
4.	"Hand in Hand"	Kenn Kato	Katsumi Ohnishi	5:07
5.	"Wonderful Life" (ワンダフルライフ Wandafuru Raifu)	Ryo Owatari, Tomiko Van	Ryo Owatari	3:39
6.	"Boku ga Egaiteta Boku" (僕が描いてた僕 The Me I Drew)	Zenta	Zenta	3:57
7.	"Jidaishin"	Kazunori Watanabe	Kazunori Watanabe	3:55
8.	"Everything Will Be All Right"	Tomiko Van	Shohei Ohi	4:58
9.	"Fly to the Freedom"	Kyasu Morizuki	Kunio Tago	5:02
10.	"Dear Memories"	Tomiko Van	Zenta	4:57
11.	"1176 Jikan" (1176時間 1176 Hours)	Psycho Kawamura	Yoshihiro Suda	4:30
12.	"Kimi ga Inai Mirai" (君がいない未来 A Future Without You)	Kano Inoue, Kyasu Morizuki, Tomiko Van	Katsumi Ohnishi	4:19

DVD
No.	Title	Director(s)	Length
1.	"1/100" (Music video)	A.T.
2.	"Hand in Hand" (Music video)	Tarō Okagawa
3.	"Kimi ga Inai Mirai" (君がいない未来 A Future Without You) (Music video)	Wataru Takeishi
4.	"Do As Infinity Live 2010: Documentary"

== Charts ==
Chart (2011)	Peak position
Japan Oricon Weekly Albums	4
