= Do the Live =

Live album by Do As Infinity
- Released: March 12, 2003
- Genre: J-pop
- Label: Avex Trax

Do As Infinity chronology
| True Song (2002) | Do the Live (2003) | Gates of Heaven (2003) |

Do the Live is a live album by Do as Infinity, released in 2003.

== Track listing ==
=== Disc one ===
1. "SUMMER DAYS"
2. "under the sun"
3. "nice & easy"
4. "Desire"
5. "Hi no Ataru Sakamichi" (陽のあたる坂道, Sunny Hill)
6. "Good for you"
7. "Heart"
8. MC
9. "Shinjitsu no Uta" (真実の詩, True Song)
10. "Yesterday & Today"
11. "We are."

=== Disc two ===
1. MC
2. "Grateful Journey"
3. "Tōku Made" (遠くまで, Far Away)
4. "Boukensha Tachi" (冒険者たち, Adventurers)
5. "135"
6. "One or Eight"
7. "Ai no Uta" (あいのうた, Love Song)
8. MC
9. "Tsurezure Naru Mama Ni" (徒然なるままに)
10. "Week!"

== Chart positions ==
| Chart (2003) | Peak position | Sales |
|---|---|---|
| Japan Oricon | 12 | 32,000 |
