= Eternal Flame (album) =

Studio album by Do As Infinity
- Released: September 30, 2009
- Genre: J-pop
- Length: 57:41
- Label: Avex Trax
- Producer: Seiji Kameda

Do As Infinity chronology
Do As Infinity: Final (2006)	Eternal Flame (2009)	Eight (2011)

Eternal Flame is Do As Infinity's seventh studio album, released on September 30, 2009. The band had disbanded in September 2005, but reformed three years later in September 2008. This is the first new album the band released after reforming, and is the first album by the band not to have Dai Nagao on the staff, though his song "Tangerine Dream" was remixed as a bonus track. The album contains twelve music tracks plus one bonus track for the limited edition first print release of Eternal Flame. Two of the tracks were originally featured on Do As Infinity's 21st single "∞1" (2009). Three of the songs were featured on Japanese television: "Saigo no Game", "Meramera", and "Piece Of Your Heart". Two different editions of the album were released, CD and CD+DVD.

Between March 14 and April 14, 2009, a contest called Do! Creative!! was held to give Do As Infinity fans a chance to compose songs that the band would later perform. Of the approximately 1000 songs received, three were chosen to be placed on Eternal Flame: "Nighter" composed by Yu, "Kitakaze" composed by Yosuke Kawashima, and "Honō" composed by Shinpei.

== Track listing ==
All music arranged by Seiji Kameda.

No.	Title	Lyrics	Music	Length
1.	"Eternal Flame"	Kanata Alexis Okajima	Takumi Ishida	6:26
2.	"Saigo no Game" (最後のGAME Last Game)	Kano Inoue	Masato Kitano	3:31
3.	"Perfect World"	Hiroaki Hayama	Hiroaki Hayama	5:02
4.	"Namonaki Kakumei" (名もなき革命 Nameless Revolution)	Kano Inoue	Kazuto Ikeda	3:54
5.	"Nighter" (ナイター Naitā)	Kano Inoue	Yu	3:47
6.	"Feelin' The Light"	Kanata Alexis Okajima	Hiroaki Hara	3:42
7.	"Meramera" (メラメラ Flaring Up)	Kana Inoue, Zenta	Zenta	3:35
8.	"Piece Of Your Heart"	Ryo Owatari	Takumi Ishida	4:15
9.	"Kitakaze" (北風 North Wind)	Kano Inoue	Yosuke Kawashima	4:19
10.	"His Hometown"	Kano Inoue	Uka	4:41
11.	"Honō" (焔 Flame)	Ryo Owatari	Shinpei	5:05
12.	"Umareyuku Monotachi e" (生まれゆくものたちへ To Those Being Born)	Kana Inoue, Junya Urushino	Yoshihiro Suda	4:36

Bonus track on first pressing
No.	Title	Lyrics	Music	Length
13.	"Tangerine Dream (10th Anniversary)^{[A]}"	Naoto Suzuki	Dai Nagao	4:48

DVD
No.	Title	Length
1.	"Eternal Flame" (Music video)
2.	"Saigo no Game" (Music video)
3.	"Umareyuku Monotachi e" (Music video)
4.	"Do As Fukkatsu Made no Kiseki^{[B]}" (Do As復活までの軌跡 Do As Tracks Until Revival) (documentary)

== Chart positions ==
Chart (2009)	Peak position	Sales	Time in chart
Japan Oricon	9	24,838	7 weeks

== Notes ==
- ^{A} "Tangerine Dream (10th Anniversary)" was a bonus track only featured in the limited edition first print CD release of Eternal Flame.
- ^{B} The documentary "Do As Fukkatsu Made no Kiseki" was bonus footage only featured in the limited edition first print CD+DVD release of Eternal Flame.
