= Yesterday & Today (song) =

2000 single by Do As Infinity

Single by Do As Infinity

from the album Break of Dawn
- Language: Japanese, English
- Released: February 23, 2000
- Genre: J-Pop
- Length: 30:30
- Label: Avex Trax
- Songwriter: Dai Nagao
- Producers: Dai Nagao, Seiji Kameda

Do As Infinity singles chronology
| "Oasis" (2000) | "Yesterday & Today" (2000) | "Rumble Fish" (2000) |

Music video
- "Yesterday & Today" on YouTube

"Yesterday & Today" is Do As Infinity's fourth single, released on February 23, 2000. Both "Yesterday & Today" and "Raven" were used as the theme song for Fuji TV drama Nisennen no Koi and movie Uzumaki respectively.

This song was included in the band's compilation albums Do the Best and Do the A-side.

== Track listing ==
(According to Oricon)

1. "Yesterday & Today"
2. "Raven"
3. "Glasses"
4. "Yesterday & Today" (Instrumental)
5. "Raven" (Instrumental)
6. "Glasses" (Instrumental)
7. "Oasis" (Dub's Highspeed Remix)

== Charts ==
Weekly chart performance for "Yesterday & Today"
| Chart (2000) | Peak position |
|---|---|
| Japan (Oricon) | 10 |
