= Infinity 1 =

"∞1"

Single by Do As Infinity

from the album Eternal Flame
- Released: June 17, 2009
- Genre: J-pop
- Length: 17:05
- Label: Avex Trax
- Songwriters: Kano Inoue, Yoshihiro Suda, Junya Urushino, Tomiko Van, Zenta
- Producer: Seiji Kameda

Do As Infinity singles chronology
"Tao" (2005)	"∞1" (2009)	"Kimi ga Inai Mirai" (2010)

"∞1" (read "Infinity Ichi"; translated as "Infinity 1") is Do As Infinity's twenty-first single, released on June 17, 2009. The band had disbanded in September 2005, but reformed three years later in September 2008. This is the first new single the band released after reforming, and is the first single by the band not to have Dai Nagao. The single contains four songs, though none are named "∞1", and this is the first Do As Infinity single not to contain instrumental versions of any song. A music video directed by Kensuke Kawamura was produced for "Umareyuku Monotachi e".

== Track listing ==
No.	Title	Lyrics	Music	Length
1.	"Umareyuku Monotachi e" (生まれゆくものたちへ)	Kana Inoue, Junya Urushino	Yoshihiro Suda	4:37
2.	"Meramera" (メラメラ)	Kana Inoue, Zenta	Zenta	3:35
3.	"Timeless"	Tomiko Van, Zenta	Zenta	4:27
4.	"Let's Get Together at A-Nation"	Kana Inoue	Yoshihiro Suda	4:26

== Chart positions ==
Chart (2009)	Peak position	Sales	Time in chart
Japan Oricon	10	14,546	5 weeks
