= Shinjitsu no Uta =

Single by Do As Infinity

from the album True Song
- Released: October 30, 2002
- Genre: J-pop
- Length: 15:28
- Label: avex trax
- Songwriter: Dai Nagao
- Producers: Dai Nagao, Seiji Kameda

Do As Infinity singles chronology
"Under the Sun / Under the Moon" (2002)	"Shinjitsu no Uta" (2002)	"Mahou no Kotoba (Would You Marry Me?)" (2002)

Music video
- "Shinjitsu no Uta" on YouTube

"Shinjitsu no Uta" (真実の詩) is the fourteenth single by Do As Infinity, released in 2002. It was used as the fifth ending to the anime InuYasha.

This song was included in the band's compilation album Do the A-side.

== Track listing ==
1. "Shinjitsu no Uta" (真実の詩, Song of Truth)
2. "One or Eight"
3. "Shinjitsu no Uta" (真実の詩, Song of Truth) (Instrumental)
4. "One or Eight" (Instrumental)

== Chartss ==
Chart (2002)	Peak position	Sales
Japan Oricon	5	72,100
