= Fukai Mori =

Single by Do As Infinity

from the album Deep Forest
- Released: June 27, 2001
- Genre: J-pop, Ballad
- Length: 4:17
- Label: Avex Trax
- Songwriters: Dai Nagao; Seiji Kameda
- Producers: Dai Nagao; Seiji Kameda

Do As Infinity singles chronology
"Week!" (2001)	"Fukai Mori" (2001)	"Bōkenshatachi" (2001)

Music video
- "Fukai Mori" on YouTube

"Fukai Mori" (深い森; lit. 'Deep Forest') is the tenth single by Do As Infinity, released on June 27, 2001. It is the band's best selling single in Japan. The song is used as the second ending theme for the anime Inuyasha. The accompanying music video for "Fukai Mori" was filmed in early 2001 at the Glücks Königreich theme park in Hokkaido, Japan.

This song was included in the band's compilation albums Do the Best and Do the A-side.

The song was later covered by Eir Aoi in her single Tsubasa.

== Track listing ==
1. "Fukai Mori" (深い森, Deep Forest)
2. "Tsubasa no Keikaku" (翼の計画, Plan for Wings)
3. "Fukai Mori" (深い森, Deep Forest) (Instrumental)
4. "Tsubasa no Keikaku" (翼の計画, Plan for Wings) (Instrumental)

== Charts and certifications ==
=== Weekly charts ===
Chart (2001)	Peak position
Japan (Oricon Singles Chart)	5

=== Certifications and sales ===
Region	Certification	Certified units/sales
Japan (RIAJ) Physical	Gold	200,000^{^}
Japan (RIAJ) Digital	Gold	100,000^{*}
^{*} Sales figures based on certification alone.^{^} Shipments figures based on certification alone.
