= Tangerine Dream (song) =

Single by Do As Infinity

from the album Break of Dawn
- Released: September 29, 1999
- Genre: J-pop
- Length: 31:54
- Label: Avex Trax
- Songwriter: Dai Nagao
- Producer: Dai Nagao

Do As Infinity singles chronology
"Tangerine Dream" (1999)	"Heart" (1999)

Music video
- "Tangerine Dream" on YouTube

"Tangerine Dream" is the first single by Do As Infinity, released in 1999. "Faces" and "Simple Minds" were never included in any album.

The song was included in the band's compilation albums Do the Best and Do the A-side.

== Track listing ==
1. "Tangerine Dream"
2. "Wings"
3. "Faces"
4. "Simple Minds"
5. "Tangerine Dream" (Instrumental)
6. "Wings" (Instrumental)
7. "Faces" (Instrumental)
8. "Simple Minds" (Instrumental)

== Charts ==
Chart (1999)	Peak position	Sales
Japan Oricon	58	6,300
