= Honjitsu wa Seiten Nari =

Single by Do As Infinity

from the album Gates of Heaven
- Released: September 25, 2003
- Genre: Rock
- Length: 14:13
- Label: avex trax
- Songwriters: Dai Nagao, Ryo Owatari (Honjitsu wa seiten nari), Tomiko Van (10W40)
- Producers: Dai Nagao, Seiji Kameda

Do As Infinity singles chronology
"Mahou no Kotoba (Would You Marry Me?)" (2003)	"Honjitsu wa Seiten Nari" (2003)	"Hiiragi" (2003)

Music video
- "Honjitsu wa Seiten Nari" on YouTube

"Honjitsu wa Seiten Nari" (Japanese: 本日ハ晴天ナリ) is the sixteenth single by Do As Infinity, released in 2003. The jacket shoot was done during a-nation 2003 before fans were allowed to enter the arena where the event was held. The jackets for both the CD and CD+DVD versions include Tomiko Van and Ryo Owatari holding bubble boards as if they were talking in comic-style. This song was considered the theme song to a-nation 2003.

This song was included in the band's compilation album Do the A-side.

It is featured in the football management simulation video game Winning Eleven Tactics: J.League.

== Track listing ==
1. "Honjitsu wa Seiten Nari" (本日ハ晴天ナリ, Today is Going to be a Fine Day)
2. "10W40"
3. "Honjitsu wa Seiten Nari" (本日ハ晴天ナリ, Today is Going to be a Fine Day) (Instrumental)
4. "10W40" (Instrumental)

== Charts ==
Chart (2003)	Peak position	Sales
Japan Oricon	4	48,800
