= Michitarō =

- Gender: Male

Origin
- Origin: Japanese
- Meaning: Different meanings depending on the kanji used

Michitarō, Michitaro or Michitarou (written: 道太郎) is a masculine Japanese given name. Notable people with the name include:

- Michitarō Komatsubara (小松原 道太郎) (1885–1940), Japanese general
- Michitaro Tozuka (戸塚 道太郎) (1890–1966), Imperial Japanese Navy admiral
