= Missile Innovation =

Japanese rock band

Missile Innovation (ミサイルイノベーション)
- Origin: Japan
- Genres: Rock
- Years active: 2005–present
- Labels: tearbridge records
- Members: Hisayoshi Hayashi; Ryo Owatari; Yoshiyasu Hayashi
- Website: Official Site

Missile Innovation (ミサイルイノベーション) is a Japanese rock band formed from the former member of Do As Infinity, Ryo Owatari. The other two members are twins and were also members with Ryo from their previous band, Pee-Ka-Boo. While most of Do As Infinity and Tomiko Van (Owatari's former bandmate)'s music are both under the pop/pop-rock sound, Missile Innovation's music falls into the rock/punk-rock genre.

== Members ==
- Vocals & Guitar : Ryo Owatari
- Drums & Chorus : Hisayoshi Hayashi
- Bass & Chorus : Yoshiyasu Hayashi

Hisayoshi Hayashi and Yoshiyasu Hayashi are twins. Yoshiyasu Hayashi had played at some tour of Do As Infinity as a support member.

== Discography ==
=== Singles ===
#	Information	Sales
1st / Debut Single	Odoro yo Honey 踊ろよハニー: Released: February 1, 2006; Format: CD5"; Oricon Top 200 Weekly Peak: Unknown	Unknown copies sold
2nd	Here We Go!: Released: May 17, 2006; Format: CD5"; Oricon Top 200 Weekly Peak: #145	TBR

=== EPs ===
#	Information	Sales
1st / Mini Album	Missile Innovation ミサイルイノベーション: Format: CD5"; Released: July 27, 2005; Oricon Top 200 Weekly Peak: #171	Unknown copies sold

=== Albums ===
#	Information	Sales
1st / Album	Be a Man: Format: CD5"; Released: July 5, 2006; Oricon Top 200 Weekly Peak: Unknown	Unknown
