= Bōkenshatachi =

Single by Do As Infinity

from the album Deep Forest
- Released: September 5, 2001
- Genre: J-pop
- Length: 18:50
- Label: avex trax
- Songwriter: Dai Nagao
- Producers: Dai Nagao, Seiji Kameda

Do As Infinity singles chronology
"Fukai Mori" (2001)	"Bōkenshatachi" (2001)	"Hi no Ataru Sakamichi" (2002)

Music video
- "Bōkenshatachi" on YouTube

"Bōkenshatachi" (冒険者たち) is the eleventh single by Do As Infinity, released in 2001.

This song was included in the band's compilation albums Do the Best and Do the A-side.

== Track listing ==
1. "Bōkenshatachi" (冒険者たち, Adventurers)
2. "Remember the Hill"
3. "Bōkenshatachi" (冒険者たち, Adventurers) (Instrumental)
4. "Remember the Hill" (Instrumental)

== Charts ==
Chart (2001)	Peak position	Sales
Japan Oricon Singles Chart	7	86,800
