= Live in Japan (Do As Infinity album) =

Live album by Do as Infinity
- Released: March 21, 2004
- Genre: J-pop
- Length: 2:09:50
- Label: AVEX Trax

Do as Infinity chronology
Gates of Heaven (2003)	Live in Japan (2004)	Do The Best + DVD (2004)

Live in Japan is Do as Infinity's second live album, as well as a concert DVD. It was a recording of the first live concert that Do as Infinity held in Budokan which was part of the Gates of Heaven Tour. Guitarist Ryo Owatari considered Budokan as a place where only the best bands could play. The CD version was recorded on 31 January 2004 and the DVD version on 1 February 2004.

== Track listing ==
=== Disc one ===
1. "Gates of heaven"
2. "Honjitsu wa Seiten Nari" (本日ハ晴天ナリ, We Will Have Fine Weather Today)
3. "under the sun"
4. "We are."
5. MC
6. "Hi no Ataru Sakamichi" (陽のあたる坂道, Sunny Hill)
7. "Desire"
8. "Azayaka na Hana" (アザヤカナハナ, Vivid Flower)
9. "Treasure Pleasure" (トレジャプレジャ, Toreja Pureja)
10. MC
11. "Buranko" (ブランコ, Swing)
12. "Hiiragi" (柊, Holly)
13. "Fukai Mori" (深い森, Deep Forest)
14. "Kagaku no Yoru" (科学の夜, Night of Science)

=== Disc two ===
1. MC
2. "Week!"
3. "Tōku Made" (遠くまで, Far away)
4. "Boukensha Tachi" (冒険者たち, Adventurers)
5. "135"
6. MC
7. "One or Eight"
8. "Thanksgiving Day"
9. MC -encore-
10. "Rock and Roll All Nite" -encore-
11. MC -encore-
12. "Tangerine Dream" -encore-
13. MC -encore-
14. "Field of Dreams" -encore-
15. MC -encore-
16. "SUMMER DAYS" -encore-
17. "Ai no Uta" (あいのうた, Song of Love) -encore-

=== DVD ===
1. Gates of heaven
2. 本日ハ晴天ナリ
3. under the sun
4. We are.
5. 陽のあたる坂道
6. Oasis
7. アザヤカナハナ
8. トレジャプレジャ
9. ブランコ
10. 柊
11. 深い森
12. 科学の夜
13. Week!
14. 遠くまで
15. 冒険者たち
16. 135
17. One or Eight
18. Thanksgiving Day
19. Detroit Rock City -ENCORE-
20. Tangerine Dream -ENCORE-
21. Field of dreams -ENCORE-
22. SUMMER DAYS -ENCORE-
23. あいのうた -ENCORE-

== Chart positions ==
Chart (2004)	Peak position	Sales
Japan Oricon	23	17,000

Sales is for the CD version.
