= Tōku Made =

Single by Do As Infinity

from the album Deep Forest
- Released: April 25, 2001
- Genre: J-pop
- Length: 16:59
- Label: avex trax
- Songwriter: Dai Nagao
- Producers: Dai Nagao, Seiji Kameda

Do As Infinity singles chronology
"Desire" (2001)	"Tōku Made" (2001)	"Week!" (2001)

Music video
- "Tōku Made" on YouTube

"Tōku Made" (遠くまで) is the eighth single by Do As Infinity, released in 2001. "Tōku Made" was the theme song to the anime movie Vampire Hunter D: Bloodlust and was also used during the final episode of the first series of the Japanese TV drama "Waterboys". "Signal" was the theme song to a Lavenus hair care TV commercial which starred the lead vocalist, Tomiko Van.

This song was included in the band's compilation albums Do the Best and Do the A-side.

== Track listing ==
1. "Tōku Made" (遠くまで; Far Away)
2. "Signal" (シグナル, Shigunaru)
3. "Tōku Made" (遠くまで; Far Away) (Instrumental)
4. "Signal" (シグナル, Shigunaru) (Instrumental)

== Charts ==
Chart (2001)	Peak position	Sales
Japan Oricon singles chart	12	89,600
