= Need Your Love (album) =

Studio album by Do As Infinity
- Released: February 16, 2005
- Genre: J-pop
- Length: 45:00
- Label: AVEX Trax
- Producer: Dai Nagao / Seiji Kameda

Do As Infinity chronology
Do the B-side (2004)	Need Your Love (2005)	Do the A-side (2005)

Need Your Love is the sixth album from the Japanese band Do As Infinity. It was released on February 16, 2005. The first (pre-album) single release from Need Your Love was "Rakuen", also featured in the fourth movie in the InuYasha anime series. Several other songs from the album, including "For the Future" and "Be Free", have been featured on Japanese television, as well as Yotaka no Yume being featured as the opening theme of Zoids Genesis. Five different editions of this album were released, CD, CD+DVD, CD+DVD+T-shirt Van design, CD+DVD+T-shirt Ryo design, and SACD.

== Track listing ==
No.	Title	Lyrics	Music	Arranger(s)	Length
1.	"For the future"	Ryo Owatari	D.A.I	D.A.I & Seiji Kameda	4:19
2.	"Blue"	Ryo Owatari	D.A.I	D.A.I & Seiji Kameda	3:43
3.	"BE FREE"	Ryo Owatari	Dai Nagao	D.A.I & Seiji Kameda	4:12
4.	"Rakuen (楽園; Paradise)"	Ryo Owatari	D.A.I	D.A.I & Seiji Kameda	4:58
5.	"Ever..."	Tomiko Van	D.A.I	D.A.I & Seiji Kameda	4:31
6.	"one flesh"	Tomiko Van	D.A.I	D.A.I & Seiji Kameda	3:13
7.	"ROBOT"	Saiko Kawamura	D.A.I	D.A.I & Seiji Kameda	3:28
8.	"Yotaka no Yume (夜鷹の夢; Dream of the Nighthawk)"	Saiko Kawamura	D.A.I	D.A.I & Seiji Kameda	4:49
9.	"Ultimate G.V"	Tomiko Van	D.A.I	D.A.I & Seiji Kameda	3:17
10.	"Need your love"	Ryo Owatari	D.A.I	D.A.I & Seiji Kameda	4:48
11.	"Na no Hanabatake (菜ノ花畑; Vegetable Garden)"	Saiko Kawamura	D.A.I	D.A.I & Seiji Kameda	3:36

Bonus Track
No.	Title	Lyrics	Music	Arranger(s)	Length
12.	"Hiiragi (柊; Holly)" (Acoustic ver.)	D.A.I	D.A.I	D.A.I & Seiji Kameda	4:27

DVD
No.	Title	Length
1.	"BE FREE" (Music video)
2.	"ROBOT" (Music video)

== Chart positions ==
Chart (2005)	Peak position	Sales
Japan Oricon	3	137,000
