= Do the Best (Do As Infinity album) =

2002 album by Do As Infinity

Greatest hits album by Do As Infinity
- Released: March 20, 2002
- Genre: J-pop
- Length: 1:12:08
- Label: avex trax
- Producer: Dai Nagao / Seiji Kameda

Do As Infinity chronology
Deep Forest (2001)	Do the Best (2002)	True Song (2002)

Do the Best+DVD

Video by Do As Infinity
- Released: March 31, 2004
- Genre: J-pop
- Length: 1:12:08
- Label: avex trax
- Producer: Dai Nagao / Seiji Kameda

Do As Infinity chronology
Do As Infinity Live in Japan (2004)	Do the Best+DVD (2004)	Do the B-Side (2004)

Do the Best is a greatest hits album by the musical group Do As Infinity, released in 2002. In 2004, a combined compilation Do the Best + DVD was released. Some of the tracks in the album have minor changes, such as "Oasis" having an actual, definite ending unlike the original single where it previously had faded out instead. "Nice & Easy" was a brand new song that was included, it was also used as the theme song for a Lavenus commercial song featuring lead singer and musician, Tomiko Van. The CD+DVD version of the album is a re-release which was released in 2004 and included a DVD with numerous (either live or promotional) videos of the first thirteen tracks of the CD album.

== Track listing ==
All lyrics are written by D.A.I; all music is composed by D.A.I, arranged by Do As Infinity & Seiji Kameda.

CD: Album
No.	Title	Length
1.	"SUMMER DAYS"	3:54
2.	"Tōku Made (遠くまで; Far Away)"	4:02
3.	"Hi no Ataru Sakamichi (陽のあたる坂道; Sun-Lit Hill)"	4:26
4.	"Desire"	4:30
5.	"Heart"	4:04
6.	"Enrai (遠雷; Distant Thunder)"	3:41
7.	"Week!"	4:17
8.	"new world"	5:24
9.	"Yesterday & Today"	5:59
10.	"Oasis"	4:44
11.	"135"	4:32
12.	"Fukai Mori (深い森; Deep Forest)"	4:04
13.	"nice & easy"	4:20
14.	"Boukensha Tachi (冒険者たち; Adventurers)" (Great Tour Band Version)	4:14
15.	"Tangerine Dream" (Great Tour Band Version)	3:59
16.	"Welcome!" (Great Tour Band Version)	3:08
17.	"We are." (Great Tour Band Version)	3:55

DVD
No.	Title	Length
1.	"SUMMER DAYS -Live at Zepp Tokyo, 2002.12.31-"
2.	"Tōku Made (遠くまで; Far Away)" (Promotion Clip)
3.	"Hi no Ataru Sakamichi (陽のあたる坂道; Sunny hill)" (Promotion Clip)
4.	"Desire" (Promotion Clip)
5.	"Heart" (Promotion Clip)
6.	"Enrai (遠雷; Distant Thunder) -Live at Shibuya Kokaido, 2001.12.4-"
7.	"Week!" (Promotion Clip)
8.	"New World -Live at SHIBUYA-AX, 2001.5.27-"
9.	"Yesterday & Today" (Promotion Clip)
10.	"Oasis" (Promotion Clip)
11.	"135 -Live at Shibuya Kokaido, 2001.12.4-"
12.	"Fukai Mori (深い森; Deep Forest)" (Promotion Clip)
13.	"nice & easy -Live at Zepp Tokyo, 2002.12.31-"

== Chart positions ==
Chart (2002)	Peak position	Sales	Time in chart
Japan Oricon^{1}	1	832,000	30 weeks
Chart (2004)	Peak position	Sales	Time in chart
Japan Oricon²	32	12,000	3 weeks

^{1}Original CD release
²Do The Best+DVD
