= Do As Infinity =

Japanese band

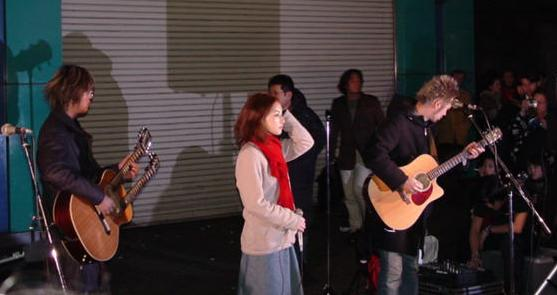
- Do As Infinity performing in 2000

Background information
- Origin: Japan
- Genres: J-pop, rock
- Years active: 1999–2005; 2008–present
- Label: Avex Trax
- Members: Tomiko Van; Ryo Owatari
- Past members: Dai Nagao
- Website: d-a-i.com

Do As Infinity is a Japanese pop and rock band that formed in 1999 with three members: vocalist Tomiko Van, guitarist Ryo Owatari, and guitarist and composer Dai Nagao. The band's name is sometimes abbreviated as DAI, alluding to the fact that Do As Infinity was named after Nagao. Signed to Avex Trax, the band released their debut single "Tangerine Dream" on September 29, 1999, followed by three more singles between 1999 and 2000, which appeared on their debut album Break of Dawn (2000). In December 2000, Nagao decided to devote all his time to composing the music and no longer appeared at live events. Five more studio albums were released between 2001 with New World and 2005 with Need Your Love.

With the release of their A-side singles compilation album Do the A-side (2005), Do As Infinity disbanded on September 29, 2005. The members continued work in the music industry, with Van pursuing a solo career, Owatari working with his band Missile Innovation formed in 2004, and Nagao continuing to work with other artists at Avex Trax. The band reformed on September 29, 2008, but Nagao did not return. Do As Infinity had their first new single release "∞1", in June 2009, followed by their seventh studio album Eternal Flame (2009). The band released their 11th and latest studio album Brand New Days in February 2015.

== History ==
=== 1999 ===
Dai Nagao started out as a composer for an amateur band. After its disbanding, Nagao continued composing songs, sending demo tapes to more than fifty record companies in Japan. Nagao was eventually hired by Avex Trax to work as a composer. He was immediately given a task to compose songs for Ayumi Hamasaki and Hitomi.

Eventually, auditions were held, and he chose Tomiko Van as lead singer and Ryo Owatari as guitarist. Ryo turned up for the auditions in a red tracksuit with a Fender Jaguar and his effects pedals. He was asked to perform a small segment, but instead played three songs. Tomiko sang "Heart" as a band member 42 hours after the Avex staff read her application. On September 29, 1999, the trio released their first single "Tangerine Dream", and held a live concert at the Shibuya AX. They performed almost daily at a number of locations, ranging from Shibuya's 109, to Yokohama Station. They additionally traveled to Fukuoka and other cities. Before "Tangerine Dream" was released, DAI and their fellow workers were giving out copies of their recordings for free to passersby. At their one-hundredth concert, held at Shibuya AX for free, the members of DAI recognized that the fans were the same bunch that bothered to listen to them.

The remainder of 1999 was spent performing both on the street and at in-store concerts at CD stores across the country. They also took part in choice events nationwide, including a festival in Tomiko Van's native Kumamoto Prefecture. Their streak of street concerts ended at one hundred, with a free concert for their fans, held at Shibuya Kokaido. Photos of some of their street performances were compiled into a PV for the song "Field of Dreams" which can be seen on the PV Collection 8 as well as in the background of the Live in Japan during a performance of the song.

Do As Infinity released their second single, "Heart", in December. They continued to do public appearances all the way up to the year-end Avex Millennium Count Down 1999-2000 held on New Year's Eve in Roppongi's Velfarre club. Heart was written before Tangerine Dream, but was recorded together in July due to the complicated drum samples. The band continued to appear on radio shows and at CD store events. Their third single, "Oasis", was released at the end of January. It was their first Top 30 hit and it was chosen as the official TV commercial song for Kanebo Cosmetics' Testimo line of products. "Oasis" was their first song to be used in an advertisement.

=== 2000 ===
The next single, "Yesterday & Today" was chosen as the theme song for the drama series Nisennen no Koi, which starred popular actors Miho Nakayama and Kaneshiro Takeshi and was given the primetime slot. The c/w-track, "Raven", was used as the ending song to the horror movie Uzumaki, which gathered more mainstream audiences for the band.

Their first album, Break of Dawn, debuted on number three on the Oricon album charts in March of the same year, only a month after "Yesterday & Today". They continued to make public appearances and do numerous live performances all over Japan. In August of that year, the band released the single "Rumble Fish", which was used as the theme song for the hit movie Kamen Gakuen; the cover of "Rumble Fish" was taken in Taiwan, and the trip provided the inspiration for "Shinjitsu no Uta". Also in August, the single "Summer Days" was released, which would go on to become a staple at all Do As Infinity live concerts, and was used as a theme song for Fuji TV's OL Police. "Summer Days" is also notable for being Do As Infinity's most well-known all-English song (following their first, "Break of Dawn", from their debut album). During November of that same year, the band released the festive single "We Are.", which Tomiko has often said is one of her favorite DAI songs. The band would end the year with another countdown live held at the Velfarre club in Roppongi.

Nagao resigned as front member on New Year's Eve in 2000, and concentrated on composition thereafter. After that, Nagao appeared in front of their fans as a member only twice more—the performance of the third debut anniversary held in September 2002, and a guest appearance in the second encore of their last live concert held on November 25, 2005. Nagao decided to work behind the scenes as he was unable to manage both the production of music and the live performance and promotional campaign. Nagao only wrote songs after he stopped appearing in public, and he hardly participated in recording.

=== 2001 ===
2001 was a whirlwind year for the band. With an album and six singles under their belts, the trio was well on their way to becoming seasoned veterans in the business, but they still had not appeared on national television. That changed with the release of their first single in the new millennium, "Desire"; "Desire" was once named M-42, which was used in their street performances. The single was performed on the hit TV show "Music Station". However, for some reason Van represented the band by herself. Nevertheless, the song and the band got national exposure. The televised performance brought Do As Infinity to an even wider audience, and helped to make their new album, New World, debut at number one on the Oricon charts.

In the following month they would release their first promotional video collection on DVD, simply titled 9, and would go on tour throughout the month of May. After release of New World, Tomiko Van was contracted to advertise for Japanese haircare company Lavenus. Van took part in all six commercials, including one which she rode a Harley-Davidson motorbike. Van can also be seen riding the Harley-Davidson in the "Tao" promotional video. The B-side of "Tōku Made", "Signal" was used as the theme song for the first commercial. Six commercials were made in total, the other three songs included "Tsubasa no Keikaku", "Bōkenshatachi", and "Nice & Easy"; "Boukensha Tachi" was used three times.

Their ninth single was released at the end of May, "Week!". The following month would see the release of "Fukai Mori" (Deep Forest), which was chosen as the second ending theme song for the hit anime series Inuyasha. The song was a huge hit, and would soon become the band's signature song. The remainder of the year was spent in preparation for yet another live concert tour, which would begin in November, not long after the release of their eleventh single, "Bōkenshatachi", and their third album, Deep Forest, which debuted at number one on the charts.

=== 2002 ===
January 2002 started with Van appearing on the Avex charity album Various Artists Featuring Songnation, and the release of the band's twelfth hit single, "Hi no Ataru Sakamichi", the following month. Then the band went global. After releasing a best album, Do the Best in March, the band traveled to Taiwan and Hong Kong in April for a special campaign. Their following overseas was almost as huge as in their own country, drawing 500 fans to their in-store event held at the HMV CD store in Hong Kong. They were nominated for the seventeenth annual Gold Disc Award in Japan for the best Rock & Pop album of the year and won. The band took a short break upon returning to Japan, but released their thirteenth single in July, the double A-sided "Under the Sun / Under the Moon". In August the band participated in Avex's A-nation tour, performing in eight venues all over Japan.

Do As Infinity's fourteenth single, "Shinjitsu no Uta", was released in October, and sparked the beginning of a new project for the band. "Shinjitsu no Uta" was also chosen to be the fifth ending theme for Inuyasha. "Shinjitsu no Uta" became famous in China in July 2002 and was also translated into Mandarin. In the booklet of Do The A-side, Kawamura stated that "Shinjitsu no Uta" was actually written two years before the actual release. Dai said that he left it as a demo because he felt that something was missing in the song. Despite their success, Do As Infinity wanted to show their fans that they had not forgotten them. They advertised on their website for fans to send them short stories using the band's previous releases as themes and using the word shinjitsu (truth) somewhere in the story. Entitled Your Truth, these stories are now available in book form. The band closed out the year with another live tour, understandably titled Do As Infinity greatest year 02: All Standing, and the year-end release of their fourth album, True Song.

=== 2003-2004 ===
The band got busy on the concert tour of True Song and new recordings, their fifteenth single, "Mahou no Kotoba: Would You Marry Me?" released as their first single in 2003. It became one of the most frequently played songs at weddings in Japan, becoming one of the band's most publicized singles of the year. "Honjitsu wa Seiten Nari" followed the popularity of its precedent single, it was previewed in their annual summer activity, a-nation. During this promotion period it was the first time the vocalist cut her hair short and with a bright blonde dye, she changed it back to a dark brown dye after the release of this single. The single's promotional video was filmed during their a-nation 2003 activity and combined many different a-nation 2003 visits in different areas in Japan, marking another success for the band. "Hiiragi" was released in November of the same year and the announcement of the fifth album followed. Tomiko met with famous American singer, Michelle Branch, during her visit in Japan to promote her album Hotel Paper, for a magazine interview and photoshoot. After the release of Gates of Heaven the group took a short break and performed in New York City, New York and Dallas, Texas in the summer of 2004 as a small warm-up for their next album; footage of this can be found in the DVD Live Year 2004. They performed in Korea during the Korea & Japan Friendship Week in JEJU along with jtL. Do As Infinity performed "Rakuen" as the ending theme of Inuyasha the Movie: Fire on the Mystic Island in December 2004.

=== 2005 ===
In early 2005, the band were in the midst of another live concert tour, showcasing their sixth studio album Need Your Love, along with video collections and recorded live concerts. Although Dai Nagao was not as active as he was in the beginning, (he did not participate in promotional events anymore) he was still the main composer behind the band.

"Tao" became Do As Infinity's twentieth single released on July 27, 2005, and the last before disbanding later that year. The lyrics of "Tao" described about friends parting ways and this caused many rumors among the fans about the disbanding of Do As Infinity. "Tao" is also the main theme of Tales of Legendia, an RPG released in summer 2005 and developed by Namco. The band announced on September 14 that they would disband on September 29, 2005, just six years to the day of their first single, "Tangerine Dream". Their last concert was at the Nippon Budokan on November 25, 2005. Three days before the final concert, Dai Nagao released the last Do As Infinity song called "Trust" on the official website through Internet streaming. The vocals featured in this song is sung by Mizushima Kana from one of Nagao's side project artists I-lulu.

Tomiko Van, the lead singer, pursued a solo career and debuted on March 29, 2006, with her album, Farewell. Ryo Owatari, the guitarist, worked with his band, Missile Innovation, and released their first single on February 1, 2006. Owatari also worked with other Avex artists such as Ayumi Hamasaki, Ai Otsuka and AAA. Dai Nagao went on to work with Amasia Landscape and other artists under the True Song Music label, writing songs for various artists.

=== 2008-present ===
The band played a reunion show at the final show of 2008's A-nation, as stated on the official BBS and blog entries of supporting musicians. Reportedly, Do As Infinity rehearsed for a month. As "secret guests" during the A-nation live concert on August 30, 2008, the band announced they would officially reform on September 29, 2008, and that they would be holding a free concert in Yoyogi Park on September 30, 2008. They would eventually embark on a nationwide tour once more to celebrate their reunion. The band released their 21st single, "∞1", on June 17, 2009; it included four new songs. On September 30, 2009, the band released their seventh studio album, Eternal Flame. Do As Infinity provided the opening theme song, "Kimi ga Inai Mirai", to Inuyasha: The Final Act in 2009; the single for "Kimi ga Inai Mirai" was released on January 20, 2010.

Do As Infinity debuted their song "Everything Will Be All Right" on December 24, 2009, as the official 2010 promotional theme song for professional Kyōtei boat racing. "Everything Will Be All Right", as well as three other songs, was included on the band's 23rd single, "∞2", released on June 16, 2010. Do As Infinity released their 24th single "Jidaishin" on September 29, 2010. The single commemorated their 11-year anniversary and the physical copies were exclusively sold on the online music retailer Mu-mo, where they subsequently sold out. Do As Infinity held their 11-year anniversary live convert at Shibuya AX on the same day. It was broadcast live via Internet streaming through Nico Nico Douga for free. The band released their eighth studio album Eight on January 19, 2011. Do As Infinity released their 25th single "Chikai" (誓い) on July 27, 2011. The band's 26th single "Ariadne no Ito" (アリアドネの糸) was released on September 7, 2011. Do As Infinity's 27th single "Tasogare" (黄昏) was released on November 16, 2011. In 2012, Do As Infinity released two more studio albums: their ninth album Time Machine on February 29 and their tenth album Do As Infinity X on October 10. The band released the compilation album The Best of Do As Infinity on January 1, 2014. The band's 28th single "Mysterious Magic" was released on December 10, 2014; the song was used as an opening theme to the anime series Fairy Tail. Do As Infinity released their 11th album Brand New Days on February 25, 2015.

== Credit to songs ==
Under the concept of "Whoever the songwriter is, it is D.A.I", the credit was written as "D.A.I" at first, even if any other member would compose the music. After "Be Free" was collected in Do the B-side, it came to be specified who wrote a song, and, after re-formation, it came to be specified who composed as well. Tomiko Van and Ryo Owatari mainly write lyrics. Saiko Kawamura, which is a joint pen name of Jun Harada and Kayoko Shinchi, and Naoto Suzuki also write songs besides them. It seems that Dai Nagao composed almost all the music except for "Azayaka na Hana" collected in Gates of Heaven, which Ryo Owatari composed. They produced the first and the second singles by themselves, but Seiji Kameda became a joint producer from the third single; he also plays a bass guitar in recording.

=== Do! Creative!! ===
Do! Creative!! was a semiannual contest held by Do As Infinity and Avex Trax to give Do As Infinity fans a chance to compose songs that the band later performs. The first instance of Do! Creative!! was held between March 14 and April 14, 2009. Of the approximately 1000 songs received, three were chosen to be placed on Eternal Flame: "Nighter" composed by Yu, "Kitakaze" composed by Yosuke Kawashima, and "Honō" composed by Shinpei. For the second contest, held between September 1 and October 31, 2009, three were selected, two of which appear on "∞2": "Everything Will Be Alright" by Shohei Ohi, and "Haruka" by Fumiyasu Sueoka; the song composed by the third winner, Nobuhisa Fujii, has yet to be revealed. Of the contestants in the second contest, about 400 were from outside Japan.

== Members ==
Current members

- "Van": Tomiko Van (lyrics, vocals)
- "Ryo": Ryo Owatari (lyrics, guitar, backup vocals)

Former members

- "Dai": Dai Nagao (composition, guitar)

Producers

- "Dai": Dai Nagao (1999–2005)
- Seiji Kameda (2000–present) (recording bassist)

=== Backup bands ===
Great Tour Band

The members listed below are not the only band members that DAI has gone through during their career, however, these musicians are the more notable ones because of their work for DAI.

- Naoki Hayashibe (guitar)
- Jun Matsumoto (drums)
- Kazco Hamano (chorus)
- Michitaro Shimamoto (bass guitar) (former member, went on to play for Ai Otsuka and other artists)
- Jun Takase (keyboard)
- Yoshiyasu Hayashi (bass guitar)

Tour Band (2009)

- Takumi Ishida (guitar)
- Yukiko Shibuya (bass guitar)
- Jun Takase (keyboard)
- Noriyasu "Kaasuke" Kawamura (drums) (Originally he was a recording drummer from their first album Break of Dawn, and participated in the tour band from 2008.)

== Discography ==
Studio albums

- Break of Dawn (2000)
- New World (2001)
- Deep Forest (2001)
- True Song (2002)
- Gates of Heaven (2003)
- Need Your Love (2005)
- Eternal Flame (2009)
- Eight (2011)
- Time Machine (2012)
- Do As Infinity X (2012)
- Brand New Days (2015)
- Alive (2018)
- Do As Infinity (2019)
- Reborn (2026)

Compilation albums

- Do the Best (2002)
- Do the Best+DVD (2004)
- Do the B-side (2004)
- Do the A-side (2005)
- Do the Best "Great Supporters Selection" (2006)
- Minus V (2006)
- The Best of Do As Infinity (2014)
- 2 of Us [Red] -14 Re:Singles- (2016)
- 2 of Us [Blue] -14 Re:Singles- (2016)
- Lounge (2019)
- Do the B-side 2 (2019)

Live albums

- Do the Live (2003)
- Live in Japan (2004)
- Do As Infinity: Final (2006)
- Do As Infinity 14th Anniversary: Dive At It Limited Live 2013 (2014)
- Do As Infinity 16th Anniversary: October's Garden (2016)

Box set

- Do the Box (2006)
