= Do the A-side =

- CD + DVD Cover

Compilation album by Do As Infinity
- Released: September 28, 2005
- Genre: J-pop
- Length: 1:31:58
- Label: avex trax
- Producer: Dai Nagao / Seiji Kameda

Do As Infinity chronology
Need Your Love (2005)	Do the A-side (2005)	Do The Best "Great Supporters Selection" (2006) ---- Minus V (2006) ---- Do As Infinity: Final (2006) ---- Do the Box (2006)

Do the A-side is a compilation album from popular Japanese band Do As Infinity, following their announcement to split. It was released on September 28, 2005 and includes every single that they have made. This is the only CD album released from Do As Infinity which does not include any of the band's pictures besides their past CD single covers. There are two versions of this album, one with 2 CDs and a DVD as well as one only containing two CDs. The title of the album is similar to that of the group's 2004 compilation, Do the B-side, which comprises most of the B-side tracks from first seventeen maxi singles they have released.

== Track listing ==
All lyrics are written by D.A.I; all music is composed by D.A.I, except noted.

CD1
No.	Title	Arranger(s)	Length
1.	"Tangerine Dream"	Dai Nagao	4:20
2.	"Heart"	Dai Nagao	4:07
3.	"Oasis"	Seiji Kameda	4:44
4.	"Yesterday & Today"	Seiji Kameda	5:02
5.	"Rumble Fish"	Seiji Kameda	4:08
6.	"We Are."	Dai Nagao	4:26
7.	"Desire"	Seiji Kameda	4:31
8.	"Tōku Made (遠くまで; Far Away)"	Seiji Kameda	4:30
9.	"Week!"	Seiji Kameda	4:18
10.	"Fukai Mori (深い森; Deep Forest)"	Seiji Kameda	4:05
11.	"Bōkenshatachi (冒険者たち; Adventurers)"	Seiji Kameda	4:09

All music is composed by D.A.I, arranged by Seiji Kameda.

CD2
No.	Title	Lyrics	Arranger(s)	Length
1.	"Hi no Ataru Sakamichi (陽のあたる坂道; Sunny Hill)"		Seiji Kameda	4:26
2.	"Under the Sun"		Seiji Kameda	4:08
3.	"Under the Moon"		Seiji Kameda	4:28
4.	"Shinjitsu no Uta (真実の詩; True Song)"		Seiji Kameda	4:16
5.	"Mahou no Kotoba (魔法の言葉; The Magic Words) ~Would You Marry Me?~"		Seiji Kameda	4:25
6.	"Honjitsu wa Seiten Nari (本日ハ晴天ナリ; Today's Gonna Be a Fine Day)"		Seiji Kameda	3:16
7.	"Hiiragi (柊; Holly)"		Seiji Kameda	4:32
8.	"Rakuen (楽園; Paradise)"	Ryo Owatari	Seiji Kameda	4:58
9.	"For the Future"	Ryo Owatari	Seiji Kameda	4:20
10.	"Tao"	Saiko Kawamura	Seiji Kameda	4:38

DVD: Music video
No.	Title	Length
1.	"Tangerine Dream"
2.	"Heart"
3.	"Oasis"
4.	"Yesterday & Today"
5.	"Rumble Fish"
6.	"We Are."
7.	"Desire"
8.	"Tōku Made"
9.	"Week!"
10.	"Fukai Mori"
11.	"Bōkenshatachi"
12.	"Hi no Ataru Sakamichi"
13.	"Under the Sun"
14.	"Under the Moon"
15.	"Shinjitsu no Uta"
16.	"Mahou no Kotoba (Would You Marry Me?)"
17.	"Honjitsu wa Seiten Nari"
18.	"Hiiragi"
19.	"Rakuen"
20.	"For the Future"
21.	"Tao"

== Chart positions ==
Chart (2005)	Peak position	Sales	Time in chart
Japan Oricon^{1}	3	279,206	12 weeks

^{1}Do The A side+DVD
