= Seiji Kameda =

Seiji Kameda 亀田 誠治
- Born: June 3, 1964 (age 62); New York City, United States
- Genres: Japanese pop; Pop music
- Occupations: Composer; Music arranger; Music producer; Instrumentalist
- Instrument: Bass guitar
- Years active: 1988–present
- Label: EMI Music Japan (as Tokyo Jihen)
- Member of: Bank Band; Tokyo Jihen

Seiji Kameda (亀田 誠治, Kameda Seiji; born June 3, 1964) is a Japanese music producer, arranger and bass guitarist. He has worked extensively with Ringo Sheena, serving as her producer and touring bassist for many years, including his tenure with their band Tokyo Jihen.

== Biography ==
He was born in New York City but moved to Japan when he was one. He started piano classes with his elder sister when he was 3 years old. In 1970 he moved to Osaka. One year later he joined Chisato Elementary School. He began to study classical guitar in 1975 with his elder brother.

In 1976 Kameda moved to Tokyo. He developed a hobby of trying to intercept radio signals from across the ocean, using an instrument called BCL (Broadcast Communications Limited), to hear western-style music. In 1977 he started broadcasting his own radio station (FM KAMEDA) from his room. Three years later he joined Musashi High School and bought his first bass guitar, a Yamaha BB2000. In 1984 Kameda exchanged his Yamaha for a Frettor and got his first Fender Jazz Bass. In 1987 he graduated from Waseda University and began to record self-made demo tapes with his arrangements. One year later he finally began his bassist and arranger-producer career.

In 1999, he participated in the production of Ringo Sheena's first and second album as an arranger, and they were big hits. Because of those hits, he received many commissions to produce music. That started his great success. Since then he has been producing for musicians and bands like Spitz, Ken Hirai, Shikao Suga, Do As Infinity, Angela Aki, and others. He also participates in many musicians' recordings as a session bassist, or plays a bass guitar as a member of various solo singers' tour bands, or temporary bands like Bank Band (2005–present).

From May 2 to 3, 2009, Kameda gathered artists whom he’s had relations with throughout his career, and promoted the music festival "Kame no Ongaeshi."

In 2020, he provided the music for the film Threads: Our Tapestry of Love.

== Related musicians ==
The following are Japanese musicians and musical groups related to Kameda. They were produced, or their songs were arranged by Kameda, and also he offered songs to them.

=== Musicians ===
Name	Work
Aki, Angela	Producer
Aonishi, Takashi	Producer
Aragaki, Yui	Producer
Arai, Akino	Arranger
Ayaka	Producer
Ayase, Haruka	Producer
Chage	Arranger
Chara	Producer
Denda, Mao	Producer
Domoto, Tsuyoshi	Arranger
Fukada, Kyoko	Arranger
Fukuhara, Miho	Producer
Hamasaki, Ayumi	Arranger
Hanae	Producer
Haneda, Erika	Producer
Hara, Yuko	Producer
Hata, Motohiro	Producer
Hayasaka, Yoshie	Producer
Hirahara, Ayaka	Producer
Hirai, Ken	Producer
Hirosawa, Tadashi	Producer
Horikawa, Sanae	Producer
Hsu, Vivian	Producer
Issa	Arranger
Izumikawa, Sora	Producer
Juju	Producer
K	Producer
Kimura, Kaela	Composer
Koda, Kumi	Arranger
Kōda, Mariko	Producer
Ku, Reijo	Producer
Kuno, Shinji	Producer
May	Producer
Miyazawa, Kazufumi	Producer
Moriguchi, Hiroko	Producer
Nagasaku, Hiromi	Producer
Nakamura, Ataru	Producer
nicco	Producer
Nishida, Akihiko	Producer
Nishiwaki, Yui	Producer
Numata, Sohei	Producer
Sakamoto, Maaya	Bassist
Shiina, Ringo	Arranger
Shimizu, Shota	Producer
Shimokawa, Mikuni	Producer
siori	Producer
Soma, Hiroko	Producer
Suga, Shikao	Producer
Sugimoto, Rie	Producer
Suzuki, Yukari	Producer
Takahashi, Yumiko	Producer
Takano, Hiroshi	Producer
Tane, Tomoko	Arranger
Tange, Sakura	Producer
Tanimura, Yumi	Producer
Tetsu69	Producer
Tomosaka, Rie	Producer
Tsuyuzaki, Harumi	Producer
Uchida, Yuki	Producer
Uemura, Kana	Producer
Watanabe, Anne	Producer
Wise	Producer
Yabe, Miho	Producer
Yano, Maki	Producer
Yonekura, Chihiro	Producer
Yonemura, Hiromi	Producer
Yuki	Producer

=== Musical groups ===
Name	Role
175R	Producer
Bank Band	Band member (bassist)
The Boom	Producer
Breath	Producer
Cannabis (Tsutaya, Koichi)	Producer
Charcoal Filter	Producer
chatmonchy	Producer
Checkicco	Producer
Clammbon	Producer
Coco	Producer
Cune	Producer
Dew	Producer
Do As Infinity	Producer and studio bassist
Elephant Kashimashi	Producer
Emi with Mori Kame Hashi (Emi Fujita)	Bassist
Et-King	Producer
Every Little Thing	Producer
The Flare	Producer
Flow	Producer
Flower Companyz	Producer
FoZZtone	Producer
Fujifabric	Producer
Fūmidō	Producer
Funky Monkey Babys	Producer
Fuzzy Control	Producer
Giraffe (Momota, Rui)	Producer
Glim Spanky	Producer
Gospellers	Producer
Hara-Fūmi (Yuko Hara×Fūmidō)	Producer
Ikimono-gakari	Producer
Kōrin	Producer
L'Arc-en-Ciel	Arranger
Lita	Producer
Lucifer	Producer
Matsusen	Producer
Merengue (Kenji Kubo)	Producer
Missile Innovation	Producer
Miyavi vs Kreva	Producer
Nazca	Producer
Natural High	Producer
Nico Touches the Walls	Producer
Nijisanji EN (Meloco Kyoran×Ike Eveland)	Producer
Noanowa	Producer
Over The Dogs	Producer
Pierrot	Producer
Plastic Tree	Producer
Porno Graffitti	Bassist
Puffy AmiYumi	Producer
ribbon	Producer
Rock'a'Trench	Producer
Sekaiichi	Producer
Sophia	Producer
Spitz	Producer
the strange drama	Producer
Stars	Producer
The Three (Tomoyasu Hotei×Kreva×Seiji Kameda)	Producer
Tokyo Jihen	Band member (bassist)
Two of US	Producer
Under The Counter	Producer
Weaver	Producer
YamaArashi	Producer
Yuzu	Producer
