= Hitomi discography =

- Studio albums: 11
- Extended plays: 2
- Live albums: 1
- Compilation albums: 5
- Singles: 43

Japanese singer Hitomi has released eleven studio albums, two extended plays, five compilation albums, one live album, and over forty singles, alongside numerous video releases.

She debuted in 1994 with her first single "Let's Play Winter," achieved peak commercial success in Japan during the late 1990s and early 2000s. Her early work featured upbeat dance-pop, largely produced by Tetsuya Komuro, while later releases incorporated a more personal songwriting after she gained greater creative control. Several albums topped the Oricon music charts, including her second studio album By Myself (1996), the greatest-hits collection H (1999), Huma-rhythm (2002), and the best-of Self Portrait (2002). Notable singles include her breakthrough hit "Candy Girl" (1995), which sold nearly 400,000 copies, and "Love 2000" (2000). Multiple releases earned certifications by the Recording Industry Association of Japan (RIAJ), including multi-platinum albums and gold singles.

Following a shift to her independent imprint Love Life Records in the mid-2000s, her output became less commercially dominant, with releases often digital-only or low-charting after the early 2010s. Activity slowed amid personal life events. She marked her 30th anniversary in the music industry in 2025 with an acoustic concert, the digital live album Re:Connect, and the single "Stand by..." in early 2026, which became her first new material in several years.

== Albums ==
=== Studio albums ===
Title	Album details	Peak chart positions	Sales	Certifications
Title	Album details	JPN	Sales	Certifications
Go to the Top	Released: September 27, 1995; Label: Avex Trax; Formats: CD, cassette, digital download, streaming	3	JPN: 406,000	RIAJ (phy.): Gold
By Myself	Released: September 11, 1996; Label: Avex Trax; Formats: CD, digital download, streaming	1	JPN: 800,000	RIAJ (phy.): 3× Platinum (Note: By Myself received a 2× Platinum certification for 800,000 copies, however the 2× Platinum threshold was redefined as 500,000 copies in 2003.)
Déjà-vu	Released: November 12, 1997; Label: Avex Trax; Formats: CD, digital download, streaming	2	JPN: 600,000	RIAJ (phy.): Platinum
Thermo Plastic	Released: October 13, 1999; Label: Avex Trax; Formats: CD, digital download, streaming	2	JPN: 325,000	RIAJ (phy.): Platinum
Love Life	Released: December 13, 2000; Label: Avex Trax; Formats: CD, digital download, streaming	2	JPN: 765,000	RIAJ (phy.): 3× Platinum (Note: Love Life received a 2× Platinum certification for 800,000 copies, however the 2× Platinum threshold was redefined as 500,000 copies in 2003.)
Huma-rhythm	Released: January 30, 2002; Label: Avex Trax; Formats: CD, digital download, streaming	1	JPN: 520,000	RIAJ (phy.): Platinum
Traveler	Released: May 12, 2004; Label: Avex Trax; Formats: CD, CD+DVD, digital download, streaming	2	JPN: 70,000	RIAJ (phy.): Gold
Love Concent	Released: September 27, 2006; Label: Love Life Records; Formats: CD, CD+DVD, digital download, streaming	13	JPN: 25,000	
Love Life 2	Released: June 24, 2009; Label: Love Life Records; Formats: CD, CD+DVD, digital download, streaming	27	JPN: 8,000	
Spirit	Released: April 27, 2011; Label: Maximum10; Formats: CD, digital download, streaming	125	JPN: 1,000	
Mobius	Released: October 10, 2012; Label: Maximum10; Formats: CD, CD+DVD, digital download, streaming	111	JPN: 800	

=== Extended plays ===
Title	Album details	Peak chart positions	Sales
Title	Album details	JPN	Sales
Special	Released: November 30, 2011; Label: Love Life Records; Formats: CD+DVD, digital download, streaming	151	JPN: 700
Journey	Released: November 30, 2015; Label: Love Life Records; Formats: Digital download, streaming	—	

=== Compilation albums ===
Title	Album details	Peak chart positions	Sales	Certifications
Title	Album details	JPN	Sales	Certifications
H	Type: Greatest hits album; Released: February 24, 1999; Label: Avex Trax; Formats: CD, digital download, streaming	1	JPN: 586,000	RIAJ (phy.): Platinum
Self Portrait	Type: Greatest hits album; Released: September 4, 2002; Label: Avex Trax; Formats: CD, digital download, streaming	1	JPN: 650,000	RIAJ (phy.): Platinum
HTM: Tiartrop Fles	Type: B-side collection; Released: October 16, 2003; Label: Avex Trax; Formats: CD, digital download	19	JPN: 23,000	
Peace	Type: Singles collection; Released: December 4, 2007; Label: Love Life Records; Formats: CD, CD/DVD, digital download	19	JPN: 24,000	
Hitomi's Best for Walking	Type: Compilation album; Released: March 12, 2014; Label: Love Life Records; Formats: Digital download, streaming	—		

=== Live albums ===
Title	Album details
Re:Connect	Released: December 24, 2025; Label: Avex Trax; Formats: Digital download, streaming

== Singles ==
=== 1990s ===
List of singles as lead artist
Title	Year	Peak chart positions	Sales	Certifications	Album
Title	Year	JPN	Sales	Certifications	Album
"Let's Play Winter"	1994	—			Go to the Top
"We Are "Lonely Girl""	1995	61	JPN: 19,000		Go to the Top
"Candy Girl"	1995	15	JPN: 391,000	RIAJ (phy.): Gold	Go to the Top
"Go to the Top"	1995	19	JPN: 181,000		Go to the Top
"Sexy"	1996	9	JPN: 313,000	RIAJ (phy.): Gold	By Myself
"In the Future"	1996	7	JPN: 357,000	RIAJ (phy.): Gold	By Myself
"By Myself"	1996	7	JPN: 290,000	RIAJ (phy.): Gold	By Myself
"Busy Now"	1997	4	JPN: 204,000	RIAJ (phy.): Gold	Déjà-vu
"Problem"	1997	6	JPN: 173,000	RIAJ (phy.): Gold	Déjà-vu
"Pretty Eyes"	1997	5	JPN: 136,000	RIAJ (phy.): Gold	Déjà-vu
"Sora"	1998	19	JPN: 42,000	RIAJ (phy.): Gold	H
"Progress"	1998	20	JPN: 35,000		H
"Someday"	1999	25	JPN: 23,000		H
"Kimi no Tonari"	1999	13	JPN: 83,000		Thermo Plastic
"There Is..."	1999	17	JPN: 128,000		Thermo Plastic
"Taion"	1999	19	JPN: 20,000		Thermo Plastic
"—" denotes a recording that did not chart or was not released in that territory.

=== 2000s ===
List of singles as lead artist
Title	Year	Peak chart positions		Sales	Certifications	Album
Title	Year	JPN	JPN Hot 100 (Note: The Billboard Japan Hot 100 chart was established in 2008.)	Sales	Certifications	Album
"Love 2000"	2000	5		JPN: 373,000	RIAJ (dig.): Gold	Love Life
"Maria"	2000	12		JPN: 109,000		Love Life
"Kimi ni Kiss"	2000	9		JPN: 110,000		Love Life
"Inner Child"	2001	16		JPN: 51,000		Huma-rhythm
"Is It You?"	2001	4		JPN: 191,000	RIAJ (phy.): Gold	Huma-rhythm
"I Am"	2001	7		JPN: 96,000	RIAJ (phy.): Gold	Huma-rhythm
"Innocence"	2001	7		JPN: 96,000	RIAJ (phy.): Gold	Huma-rhythm
"Samurai Drive"	2002	3		JPN: 146,000	RIAJ (phy.): Gold	Huma-rhythm
"Understanding"	2002	10		JPN: 53,000		Self Portrait
"Flow"	2002	9		JPN: 39,000	RIAJ (phy.): Gold	Self Portrait
"Blade Runner"	2002	9		JPN: 39,000	RIAJ (phy.): Gold	HTM: Tiartrop Fles
"Hikari"	2004	16		JPN: 21,000		Traveler
"Kokoro no Tabibito"	2004	27		JPN: 11,000		Traveler
"Speed Star"	2004	27		JPN: 11,000		Traveler
"Japanese Girl"	2005	18		JPN: 25,000		Love Concent
"Love Angel"	2005	34		JPN: 9,000		Love Concent
"Cra"g"y Mama"	2005	46		JPN: 4,000		Love Concent
"Go My Way"	2006	22		JPN: 20,000		Love Concent
"Ai no Kotoba"	2006	49		JPN: 2,500		Love Concent
"Fight For Your Run"	2008	—	—			Love Life 2
"World! Wide! Love!"	2009	119	67	JPN: 600		Love Life 2
"—" denotes a recording that did not chart or was not released in that territory.

=== 2010s–2020s ===
List of singles as lead artist
Title	Year	Peak chart positions		Sales	Certifications	Album
Title	Year	JPN	JPN Hot 100	Sales	Certifications	Album
"Love Me Love Body"	2010	—	—			Spirit
"Umarete Kite Arigatō"	2011	48	—	JPN: 3,800		Special
"Smile World"	2011	48	—	JPN: 3,800		Special
"Bara Yume" (collaboration with MAX)	2013	—	—			Non-album singles
"Teppen Star"	2013	113	—	JPN: 500		Non-album singles
"Rainbow"	2014	—	—			Non-album singles
"Go-Go Tamagocchi!"	2014	—	—			Non-album singles
"Yume Hakonda Randoseru"	2017	—	—			Non-album singles
"Love 2020"	2019	—	—			Non-album singles
"Stand By..."	2026	—	—			Non-album singles
"There Is (Love)"	2026	—	—			Non-album singles
"Taion (Uzukumaru)"	2026	—	—			Non-album singles
"Tokey Dokey"	2026	—	—			Non-album singles
"Choice!"	2026	—	—			Non-album singles
"—" denotes a recording that did not chart or was not released in that territory.

== Video albums ==
List of video albums, with details, chart positions, and certifications
Title	Details	Peak chart positions	Certifications
Title	Details	JPN	Certifications
Nine Clips	Released: September 3, 1997 (VHS), March 29, 2000 (DVD); Labels: Avex Trax; Formats: VHS, DVD	—	
Nine Clips 2	Released: March 7, 2001; Labels: Avex Trax; Formats: VHS, DVD	4	
Live Tour 2001 Love Life	Released: August 22, 2001; Labels: Avex Trax; Formats: VHS, DVD	9	
Plus (Nine Clips + Nine Clips 2)	Released: March 13, 2002; Labels: Avex Trax; Formats: DVD	—	
Hitomi Live Tour 2002 Huma-rhythm	Released: September 4, 2002; Labels: Avex Trax; Formats: DVD	6	
Frozen in Time	Released: December 4, 2002; Labels: Avex Trax; Formats: DVD	—	
Hitomi Live Tour 2004 Traveler	Released: September 29, 2004; Labels: Avex Trax; Formats: DVD	—	
Hitomi 2005 10th Anniversary Live Thank You	Released: June 1, 2005; Labels: Avex Trax; Formats: DVD	51	
Hitomi Japanese Girl Collection 2005: Love Music, Love Fashion	Released: November 23, 2005; Labels: Love Life Records; Formats: DVD	121	
Hitomi Live Tour 2005 Love Angel	Released: March 29, 2006; Labels: Love Life Records; Formats: DVD	—	
