= Zentaro Watanabe production discography =

Japanese music discography

Japanese musician Zentaro Watanabe worked as a composer and an arranger for many pop and rock musicians, outside of his work as a band member of Shijin no Chi, Oh! Penelope and Atami.

== Soundtracks ==
List of albums, with selected chart positions
Title	Album details
Original Soundtrack Unreleased Collection "Rurouni Kenshin -Meiji Kenkaku Romantan-" -Director's Collection	Released: 21 July 1997; Label: Sony Records; Formats: CD
D×D Original Soundtrack	Released: 21 August 1997; Label: Sony Records; Formats: CD
Laundry Original Soundtrack	Released: 20 March 2002; Label: Cutting Edge; Formats: CD
Film On Next Sunday Original Soundtrack	Released: 25 March 2009; Label: NBCUniversal Entertainment Japan; Formats: CD
A Circus Troupe: Gravity's Clowns: Music from and Inspired by the Motion Picture	Released: 20 May 2009; Label: Toy's Factory; Formats: CD, digital download
My Rainy Days Original Soundtrack	Released: 18 November 2009; Label: Teichiku Entertainment; Formats: CD, digital download
Nagi-Asu: A Lull in the Sea Original Soundtrack 1	Released: 23 April 2014; Label: NBCUniversal Entertainment Japan; Formats: CD
Nagi-Asu: A Lull in the Sea Original Soundtrack 2	Released: 25 June 2014; Label: NBCUniversal Entertainment Japan; Formats: CD
Hatsukoi Original Soundtrack	Released: 21 December 2012; Label: NHK Enterprises; Formats: CD

== Songs produced for other artists ==
List of songs written or produced for other artists, showing year released and album name
Title	Year	Artist(s)	Album	Notes
"Art School"	1994	Yohito Teraoka	Rhapsody	
"Atashi Nande Dakishimetai n darō?" (あたしなんで抱きしめたいんだろう?)	1994	Chara	Happy Toy	
"Happy Toy"	1994	Chara	Happy Toy	
"Anata Shika Mienai" (あなたしか見えない)	1996	Letit Go	Beat'n Lips #1	
"Koi no Virus" (恋のウイルス)	1997	Maki Watase	Double Berry	
"Yasashii Kimochi" (やさしい気持ち, "Kind Feelings")	1997	Chara	Junior Sweet	Certified Platinum by the RIAJ.
"End of the World" (エンド・オブ・ザ・ワールド)	1997	Emi Necozawa	Chelsea Girl	
"Innocence"	1997	Noriko Hidaka (as Seta Sōjirō)	Rurouni Kenshin Original Songs II	Character song for Seta Sōjirō from Rurouni Kenshin
"I Go to Sleep"	1997	The Zip Guns	This Is Your Life	
"Nude Boy"	1997	The Zip Guns	This Is Your Life	
"Ai de Shinasai" (愛でしなさい)	1997	Kaori Hifumi	Hill of Gerbera	
"Carnival"	1997	Mai Hosho	"Carnival" / "Hell or Heaven" (single)	
"Hell or Heaven"	1997	Mai Hosho	"Carnival" / "Hell or Heaven" (single)	
"Balot" (バロット)	1997	Emi Necozawa	Broken Sewing Machine	
"Jibunrashisa Nante" (自分らしさなんて)	1997	Tomovsky	Jibunrashisa Nante	
"Namida Made" (ナミダマデ)	1998	Noriko Katō	Souvenir	
"Hoshi o Mite Kizuita Koto" (星を見て気づいたこと)	1998	Noriko Katō	Souvenir	
"Hansei no Uta" (反省のうた)	1998	Something Else	Triple Play	
"Hadaka no Mama" (裸のまま)	1998	Kaori Hifumi	Hill of Gerbera	
"Daite" (抱いて)	1998	Tatsuya Ishii	H	
"Hanabira" (花びら)	1998	Nao Matsuzaki	Kaze no Uta	
"Haru no Naka de" (春の中で)	1998	Nao Matsuzaki	"Hanabira" (single)	
"One More Kiss"	1998	Hinano Yoshikawa	I Am Pink	
"Shiroi yo." (白いよ。)	1998	Nao Matsuzaki	Kaze no Uta	
"Heitan na Senjō" (平坦な戦場)	1998	Nao Matsuzaki	Kaze no Uta	
"Tears"	1998	Nao Matsuzaki	Kaze no Uta	
"Kaze no Uta" (かぜのうた)	1998	Nao Matsuzaki	Kaze no Uta	
"Merci"	1998	Emi Necozawa	Broken Sewing Machine	
"Pas de chat" (パドゥシャ)	1998	Emi Necozawa	Broken Sewing Machine	
"Milk no Kanmuri" (ミルクの冠)	1998	Emi Necozawa	Broken Sewing Machine	
"Jane"	1998	Emi Necozawa	Broken Sewing Machine	
"Riyū Nanka Nai" (理由なんかない)	1998	Emi Necozawa	Broken Sewing Machine	
"Fukiyoraka no Umi" (不清らかの海)	1998	Emi Necozawa	Broken Sewing Machine	
"Paradox"	1998	Emi Necozawa	Broken Sewing Machine	
"Marshmallow-Waltz"	1998	Emi Necozawa	Broken Sewing Machine	
"Hitsujikai no Shōnen e" (羊飼いの少年へ)	1998	Emi Necozawa	Broken Sewing Machine	
"Jellybeans-Sick"	1998	Emi Necozawa	Broken Sewing Machine	
"Broken Sewing Machine"	1998	Emi Necozawa	Broken Sewing Machine	
"Blue"	1998	Kyo	Zoo	
"Lazy Trip"	1998	Bice	Bice	
"Mothers"	1998	Kaori Hifumi	Hill of Gerbera	
"Anata ni Mukatte" (あなたに向かって)	1998	Nao Matsuzaki	Shōjiki na Hito	
"Kokoro no Oto" (ココロのオト)	1998	Nao Matsuzaki	Shōjiki na Hito	
"I Know You Feel It"	1998	Mito Tomomi	Ai ga Afureta Hi	
"Aruite Yukō" (歩いてゆこう)	1998	Mito Tomomi	Ai ga Afureta Hi	
"Ai ga Afureta Hi" (愛があふれた日)	1998	Mito Tomomi	Ai ga Afureta Hi	
"Totteoki no Sampomichi" (とっておきの散歩道)	1998	Mito Tomomi	Ai ga Afureta Hi	
"Rosie"	1998	Mito Tomomi	Ai ga Afureta Hi	
"Sweet Strawberry Toast"	1998	Esrevnoc	EB: Esrevnoc Better	
"Goodmorning Mr. Paranoid"	1998	Kyo	Zoo	
"Baby. Butterfly."	1998	Kyo	Zoo	
"Door"	1998	Kyo	Zoo	
"BrainRadio"	1998	Kyo	Zoo	
"Loveletter"	1998	Kyo	Zoo	
"The Sun Goes Down"	1998	Kyo	Zoo	
"Shell"	1998	Emi Necozawa	Gyan-Gyan	
"Missing Words"	1998	Bice	"Sneaker" (single)	
"Good Day"	1999	Harvest	Sweets	
"Someday"	1999	Hitomi	H	
"70% (Yūgure no Uta)"	1999	Chara	Strange Fruits	
"Yūnagi" (夕凪)	1999	Nao Matsuzaki	"Denkyū" (single)	
"Kōsaten no Okitegami" (交差点の置き手紙)	1999	Nao Matsuzaki	Nijiban	
"Junkydance "	1999	Kyo	Happy?? Junky!!	
"Dry Flower" (ドライフラワー)	1999	Kyo	Happy?? Junky!!	
"Sir. Stephen"	1999	Emi Necozawa	Gyan-Gyan	
"Shampoo"	1999	Emi Necozawa	Gyan-Gyan	
"I Wanna Go to America"	1999	Emi Necozawa	Gyan-Gyan	
"Happy Song"	1999	Emi Necozawa	Gyan-Gyan	
"K."	1999	Emi Necozawa	Gyan-Gyan	
"Marble Market" (マーブルマーケット)	1999	Esrevnoc	EB: Esrevnoc Better	
"Bee Charmer"	1999	Esrevnoc	EB: Esrevnoc Better	
"Lovely" (ラヴリー)	1999	Esrevnoc	EB: Esrevnoc Better	
"Wish"	1999	Hitomi	Thermo Plastic	
"Made to Be in Love"	1999	Hitomi	Thermo Plastic	
"Wonderful Days, Wonderful Life. "	1999	Kyo	Happy?? Junky!!	
"There Is..."	1999	Hitomi	Thermo Plastic	Drama Kyukyu Hato Chiryoshitsu theme song.
"Re-Make"	1999	Hitomi	Thermo Plastic	
"The Girl in the Letters"	1999	Bice	Grand Cross 1999	
"Mō Hitori no Boku" (もう一人のボク)	1999	Nao Matsuzaki	"Amemachihito Moyō" (single)	
"Taion" (体温)	1999	Hitomi	Thermo Plastic	
"L'utero"	1999	Hitomi	Thermo Plastic	
"Gamble"	1999	Hitomi	Thermo Plastic	
"Bird"	1999	Hitomi	Thermo Plastic	
"Under the Sun"	1999	Hitomi	Thermo Plastic	
"Gumi"	1999	Kyo	Happy?? Junky!!	
"Yoru no Mukōgawa" (夜の向こう側)	1999	Kyo	Happy?? Junky!!	
"Gimme"	1999	Kyo	Happy?? Junky!!	
"Kanata e" (彼方へ)		Kyo	Happy?? Junky!!	
"Konna ni Minikui Atashi no Kao o Mitsumenaide" (こんなに醜いあたしの顔をみつめないで)	2000	Tomomi Kageyu	"Konna ni Minikui Atashi no Kao o Mitsumenaide" (single)	
"Ai Naru Sanka" (アイなる賛歌)	2000	Tomomi Kageyu	Me ni Te ni Ai ni Chikau Mono	
"Jet Lag"	2000	Hàl	Teion Yakedo	
"Weathers"	2000	Hàl	Teion Yakedo	
"Love 2000"	2000	Hitomi	Love Life	Certified Gold by the RIAJ.
"Regret"	2000	Hitomi	Love Life	
"Idol o Sagase" (アイドルを探せ)	2000	Hitomi	"Love 2000" (single)	
"Destiny"	2000	Hitomi	"Love 2000" (single)	
"Presence"	2000	Zeppet Store	Gooseflesh	
"Negai" (ねがい)	2000	Kaori Hifumi	Shadow Play	
"Tsuki to Amai Namida" (月と甘い涙)	2000	Chara	Caramel Milk: The Best of Chara	Drama Limit: Moshi mo, Wagako ga... theme song
"Maria"	2000	Hitomi	Love Life	
"Over the World"	2000	Hitomi	Love Life	
"Eien to Iu Category" (永遠というカテゴリー)	2000	Hitomi	"Maria" (single)	
"Hime"	2000	Tomomi Kageyu	Me ni Te ni Ai ni Chikau Mono	
"Exit"	2000	Jenka	Home Is Where the Heart Is	Film Swing Man theme song
"Kimi ni Kiss" (キミにKISS)	2000	Hitomi	Love Life	Drama Straight News theme song
"Flower"	2000	Mayu Kitaki	Tricolor	
"Kuchibue" (口笛)	2000	Saori Kodama	Himawari to Nakimushi	
"Paradise"	2000	Hitomi	Love Life	
"Love Me Darling"	2000	Hitomi	Love Life	
"Fat Free"	2000	Hitomi	Love Life	
"Kitsuku Aishite yo" (キツク愛してよ)	2000	Hitomi	Love Life	
"Pray"	2000	Hitomi	Love Life	
"Ningyo" (人魚)	2001	Hàl	Blue	
"Kimochi no Yukue" (キモチノユクエ)	2001	Hàl	Blue	
"Inner Child"	2001	Hitomi	Huma-rhythm	
"Fighting Girl"	2001	Hitomi	"Inner Child" (single)	
"Kanashimi to Bi" (悲しみと美)	2001	Chara	Madrigal	
"Ame wa Mōfu no Yō ni (Doshaburi Mix)" (雨は毛布のように)	2001	Kirinji	"Ame wa Mōfu no Yō ni" (single)	
"Pokkari Osora" (ぽっかりおそら)	2001	Nao Matsuzaki	"Taiyō" (single)	
"Kyūkyubako" (救急箱)	2001	Yuka Kawamura	Farewells	
"Slow Train"	2001	Yuka Kawamura	Farewells	
"Is It You?"	2001	Hitomi	Huma-rhythm	Drama Dekichatta Kekkon theme song. Certified Gold by the RIAJ.
"Open Mind"	2001	Hitomi	Huma-rhythm	
"Why?"	2001	Hitomi	Huma-rhythm	
"I Am"	2001	Hitomi	Huma-rhythm	Anime Inuyasha opening theme song. Certified Gold by the RIAJ.
"Innocence"	2001	Hitomi	Huma-rhythm	
"Tsumetai Sekai" (冷たい世界)	2001	Ayano Ohki	Kagami to Onna	
"Samurai Drive"	2002	Hitomi	Huma-rhythm	Certified Gold by the RIAJ.
"Cosmic World [Intro]"	2002	Hitomi	Huma-rhythm	
"Ele Pop"	2002	Hitomi	Huma-rhythm	
"Hi Hi Hi"	2002	Hitomi	Huma-rhythm	
"Plastic Time Machine" (プラスティック タイムマシーン)	2002	Hitomi	Huma-rhythm	
"Little More" (リトルモア)	2002	Hitomi	Huma-rhythm	
"Orange" (オレンジ)	2002	Savage Genius	Non-album single	
"Flow"	2002	Hitomi	Self Portrait	Certified Gold by the RIAJ.
"Blade Runner"	2002	Hitomi	"Flow" (single)	
"Ningyo Hime" (ニンギョヒメ)	2002	Rie Tanaka	24 Wishes	Anime Chobits ending theme song
"Soshite Sekai wa Kyō mo Hajimaru (Chii Ver.)" (そして世界は今日も始まる (ちぃVer.))	2002	Rie Tanaka	"Ningyo Hime" (single)	
"Kata Koto no Koi (Chii Ver.)" (かたことの恋 (ちぃVer.))	2002	Rie Tanaka	"Ningyo Hime" (single)	
"Kokoro no Mizu" (心の水)	2002	Chara	"Hatsukoi" (single)	
"Boku no Star" (ボクのスター)	2002	Chara	"Hatsukoi" (single)	
"Seishun to wa" (青春とは)	2002	In the Soup	3	
"Curtain" (カーテン)	2002	In the Soup	"Seishun to wa" (single)	
"It's Not Easy"	2002	Kayoko	It's Not Easy	
"Mō Ichido" (もう一度…")	2003	I Wish	"Asu e no Tobira" (single)	
"Silhouette Romance" (シルエットロマンス)	2003	Tatsuya Ishii	Nipops	
"River"	2003	Tatsuya Ishii	Nipops	Anime Mobile Suit Gundam SEED theme song
"Ihōjin" (異邦人)	2003	Tatsuya Ishii	Nipops	
"Friends"	2003	Tatsuya Ishii	Nipops	
"Hana More Kaze More" (花MORE 嵐MORE)	2003	Tatsuya Ishii	Nipops	
"Hoshizora" (星空)	2003	Tatsuya Ishii	Super Nipops	
"Koibito mo Nureru Machikado" (恋人も濡れる街角)	2003	Tatsuya Ishii	Super Nipops	
"Ningyō no Ie" (人形の家)	2003	Tatsuya Ishii	Super Nipops	
"Tonight/Midnight"	2003	Chicochair	Hachimitsu Darlin	Anime E's Otherwise theme song
"Atarimae no Koto" (あたりまえのこと)	2003	Kayoko	Wagamama	
"I"	2003	I Wish	Tsutaetai Kotoba: Namida no Ochiru Basho	
"Fukai Kiri no Naka de" (深い霧の中で)	2003	Cune	"Kanon" (single)	
"Butterfly"	2003	Wyolica	Fruits & Roots	
"Bambi"	2003	Chicochair	Hachimitsu Darlin	
"Mirai (Mada Minu Jidai yo)" (未来〜まだ見ぬ時代よ〜)	2004	Tatsuya Ishii	Non-album single	
"Great Mother"	2004	Amadori	Five Kisses	
"Monsoon" (モンスーン)	2004	Amadori	Five Kisses	
"Cathy" (キャッシー)	2004	Amadori	Five Kisses	
"Beautiful View"	2004	Amadori	Five Kisses	
"Coffee" (コーヒー)	2004	Amadori	Five Kisses	
"Kokoro no Tabibito" (心の旅人)	2004	Hitomi	Traveler	Drama Rikon Bengoshi theme song
"Sparkle" (スパークル)	2004	Wyolica	Wyolica Best Collection: All The Things You Are	
"Comodón Johnson"	2004	Hitomi	Traveler	
"Steady"	2004	Hitomi	Traveler	
"Kaze no Message" (風の伝言(メッセージ))	2004	Hitomi	Traveler	
"Kimi ga Iru Ie" (君がいる家)	2004	Breath	Jukebox	
"Mangetsu" (満月)	2004	Breath	Jukebox	
"Tsukiakari (Single Edition)" (月灯り)	2004	Molmott	"Tsukiakari / Chu in Come" (single)	
"Chu in Come"	2004	Molmott	"Tsukiakari / Chu in Come" (single)	
"Mono Phone"	2004	Yoshikazu Ichikawa	Nijiiro Theater	
"To Myself"	2004	Yoshikazu Ichikawa	Nijiiro Theater	
"Portrait"	2004	Yoshikazu Ichikawa	Nijiiro Theater	
"Freeeee!!!!!"	2004	Yoshikazu Ichikawa	Nijiiro Theater	
"Dry Flower" (ドライフラワー)	2004	Yoshikazu Ichikawa	Nijiiro Theater	
"Utsukushii Hito" (美しい人)	2004	Yoshikazu Ichikawa	Nijiiro Theater	
"Heibon" (平凡)	2004	Yoshikazu Ichikawa	Nijiiro Theater	
"Time Machine ni Tsuite" (タイムマシーンについて)	2004	Meringue	Hatsukoi Sunset	
"Itsuka..." (いつか…)	2005	Shunsuke Kiyokiba	Kiyokiba Shunsuke	Certified Gold by the RIAJ.
"Toki no Yukue (Jo Haru no Sora)" (時の行方 ～序・春の空～)	2005	Naotaro Moriyama	Kessakusen 2001~2005	
"Kaze no Lullaby" (風のララバイ)	2005	Naotaro Moriyama	"Toki no Yukue (Jo Haru no Sora)" (single)	
"Aoi Hitomi no Koibito-san" (青い瞳の恋人さん)	2005	Naotaro Moriyama	"Toki no Yukue (Jo Haru no Sora)" (single)	
"Natsu no Maboroshi" (夏の幻)	2005	I Wish	Wish	
"True Colors"	2005	Speena	Candy Lovely Music!! Mune no Button ga Hajikete	
"Sweet Memories"	2005	Speena	Candy Lovely Music!! Mune no Button ga Hajikete	
"Parade Shiyō yo" (パレードしようよ)	2005	Speena	Candy Lovely Music!! Mune no Button ga Hajikete	
"Japanese Girl"	2005	Hitomi	Love Concent	
"Venus"	2005	Hitomi	"Japanese Girl" (single)	
"Yūgao" (夕顔)	2005	Cune	Best 1999-2004	
"Chiisana Koi no Yūmagure" (小さな恋の夕間暮れ)	2005	Naotaro Moriyama	"Chiisana Koi no Yūmagure" (single)	
"Setsuna" (セツナ)	2005	Naotaro Moriyama	"Chiisana Koi no Yūmagure" (single)	
"Syrup Rondo" (シロップロンド)	2005	Speena	"Kirakira Days" (single)	
"Candy" (キャンディ)	2005	Speena	"Kirakira Days" (single)	
"Love Angel"	2005	Hitomi	Love Concent	
"Escape"	2005	Hitomi	"Love Angel" (single)	
"Omedetō" (オメデトウ)	2005	THC	Time Has Come!!	
"Re:start"	2005	Surface	Resurface	Anime Yakitate!! Japan theme song
"Airy"	2005	Surface	"Re:start" (single)	
"Kazahana" (風花)	2005	Naotaro Moriyama	Kazemachi Kōsaten	
"Kimi to Pasta no Hibi" (君とパスタの日々)	2005	Naotaro Moriyama	"Kazahana" (single)	
"Densetsu" (伝説)	2005	Naotaro Moriyama	"Kazahana" (single)	
"Cra"g"y Mama"	2005	Hitomi	Love Concent	
"Time Over" (タイムオーバー)	2005	Hitomi	"Cra"g"y Mama" (single)	
"Viva! Romantic"	2005	Speena	Sugar Moon Champs-Élysées	
"Dear My Mama"	2005	Speena	Sugar Moon Champs-Élysées	
"Mizu to Amai Hana" (水と甘い花)	2005	Speena	Sugar Moon Champs-Élysées	
"Buttercream" (バタークリーム)	2005	Speena	Sugar Moon Champs-Élysées	
"Venus Journey"	2006	Eri Machimoto	World Beauty	
"Go Away Boy"	2006	Eri Machimoto	"Venus Journey / Go Away Boy" (single)	
"Wangan Drive"	2006	Eri Machimoto	"Venus Journey / Go Away Boy" (single)	
"Anata ga Ita Mori"	2006	Jyukai	Wild Flower	Anime Fate/stay night ending theme song
"Sakura Difference"	2006	Jyukai	"Anata ga Ita Mori" (single)	
"Go My Way"	2006	Hitomi	Love Concent	Drama Bengoshi no Kuzu theme song
"Lost Emotion in Darkness"	2006	Hitomi	Love Concent	
"Boku no Tokoro e" (ボクのところへ)	2006	Strobo	"Boku no Tokoro e" (single)	
"Koibito Dōshi" (恋人同士)	2006	Jyukai	Wild Flower	Anime Ah! My Goddess season 2 ending theme song.
"Ai no Kotoba"	2006	Hitomi	Love Concent	
"Aritakke no Ai" (ありったけの愛)	2006	Hitomi	"Ai no Kotoba" (single)	
"Furuboketa Coffee Cup to Banana Juice" (古ぼけたコーヒーカップとバナナジュース)	2006	Strobo	"Oikaze" (single)	
"Loveholic"	2006	Hitomi	Love Concent	
"Change Yourself"	2006	Hitomi	Love Concent	
"Ren'ai Hikō" (恋愛飛行)	2006	Hitomi	Love Concent	
"Day-O"	2006	Hitomi	Love Concent	
"Love Concent"	2006	Hitomi	Love Concent	
"So You"	2006	Hitomi	Love Concent	
"Sweet Heart of Moon"	2006	Good Dog Happy Men	Most Beautiful in the World	
"Eutopia" (ユートピア)	2006	Good Dog Happy Men	Most Beautiful in the World	
"Hoshi Akari" (ホシアカリ)	2006	Jyukai	Wild Flower	Anime Buso Renkin theme song.
"...Because I Love You."	2006	Jyukai	"Hoshi Akari" (single)	
"Oikaze" (追い風)	2006	Jyukai	Wild Flower	
"Monochrome" (モノクローム)	2006	Jyukai	Wild Flower	
"Koyoi, Anata Iro" (今宵、アナタイロ。)	2006	Jyukai	Wild Flower	
"Love Letter" (ラブレター)	2007	Strobo	"Love Letter" (single)	
"Bedroom Story" (ベッドルームストーリー)	2007	Speena	Ninnananna	
"Jewel Box" (ジュエルボックス)	2007	Speena	Ninnananna	
"Cheek to Cheek" (チークトゥチーク)	2007	Speena	Ninnananna	
"Love Hand Claps" (ラブハンドクラップス)	2007	Speena	Ninnananna	
"Moonlight Monster" (ムーンライトモンスター)	2007	Speena	Ninnananna	
"Hello, Hi!"	2007	Speena	Ninnananna	
"Girlfriend" (ガールフレンド)	2007	Speena	Ninnananna	
"Dancing Doll" (ダンシングドール)	2007	Speena	Ninnananna	
"Haruka" (ハルカ)	2007	Eri Machimoto	World Beauty	Film Exte (2007) theme song.
"Sumire no Hana no Saku Koro ni" (すみれの花の咲く頃に)	2007	Eri Machimoto	World Beauty	
"Beddie Bye"	2007	Eri Machimoto	World Beauty	
"Hitoshizuku" (ひと雫)	2007	Eri Machimoto	World Beauty	
"Back"	2007	Chara	Union	
"Ari no Yume" (アリの夢)	2007	Sachi Tainaka	Dear...	
"Happy Song"	2007	Sachi Tainaka	Dear...	
"Kirakira" (キラキラ)	2007	Strobo	"Natsu no Shōnen" (single)	
"Yoru ni Nareba" (夜になれば)	2007	The Loose Dogs	Life Size	Anime Major theme song.
"Survive" (サバイブ)	2007	The Loose Dogs	"Yoru ni Nareba" (single)	
"Kiss & Cry"	2007	Misato Watanabe	Kokoro Ginza	
"Kokoro Ginza" (ココロ銀河)	2007	Misato Watanabe	Kokoro Ginza	
"Natsudayori" (夏だより)	2007	Misato Watanabe	Kokoro Ginza	
"Kanadenai" (奏愛～かなであい～)	2007	The Loose Dogs	Life Size	Anime Major theme song.
"Mr. Miracle Man" (Ｍｒ．ミラクルマン)	2007	The Loose Dogs	Life Size	
"Liberty"	2007	Salyu	Maiden Voyage	
"Sweet Pain"	2007	Salyu	Maiden Voyage	
"Iris (Shiawase no Hako)" (iris 〜しあわせの箱〜)	2007	Salyu	Maiden Voyage	Nintendo DS game Professor Layton and the Diabolical Box theme song
"Whereabouts (For Anthony)"	2007	Salyu	"Iris (Shiawase no Hako)" (single)	
"River"	2007	Salyu	"Iris (Shiawase no Hako)" (single)	
"Sora ni Utau" (そらにうたう)	2008	Splay	After the Melody Ends	
"Star Blues"	2008	Splay	After the Melody Ends	
"Hana wa Sakura Kimi wa Utsukushi" (花は桜 君は美し)	2008	Ikimonogakari	Life Album	Certified Double Platinum by the RIAJ.
"Yes"	2008	Misato Watanabe	Non-album single	Drama Sandaime no Yome! theme song
"One Day"	2008	The Loose Dogs	Life Size	Anime Major theme song.
"88"	2008	LM.C	Gimmical☆Impact!!	Anime Reborn! theme song. Certified Gold by the RIAJ.
"Ame nochi Nijiiro" (雨のち虹色)	2008	The Loose Dogs featuring Maki Ohguro	Life Size	Anime Major theme song.
"Here"	2008	Boo Bee Benz	A Side Split Vol. 2: Water Field	
"Tomorrow"	2008	Chara	Kiss	
"Go My Way"	2008	The Loose Dogs	Life Size	
"Boku wa Koko ni Iru" (僕はここにいる)	2008	Ikimonogakari	My Song Your Song	
"Boogie Wooogie" (プギウギ)	2008	Ikimonogakari	My Song Your Song	
"Kazamidori" (カザミドリ)	2009	Maaya Sakamoto	Kazeyomi	
"Anata o Motto Suki ni Naru" (あなたをもっと好きになる)	2009	Nice Hashimoto featuring Yū Koyama	Anata o Motto Suki ni Naru	
"Under the Bed"	2009	Iku	Your Wear	
"Haruka na Sekai" (ハルカナセカイ)	2009	Iku	Your Wear	
"Sayonara Peperoncino" (さよならペペロンチーノ)	2009	Botchan	Tokyo Tower ni Nobotte	
"Tokyo Tower ni Nobotte" (東京タワーにのぼって)	2009	Botchan	Tokyo Tower ni Nobotte	
"Elevator World" (エレベーターワールド)	2009	Botchan	Tokyo Tower ni Nobotte	
"Ienai 'Suki'" (言えない「スキ」)	2009	Yui Aragaki	"Utsushie" (single)	
"Memory"	2009	Hitomi	Love Life 2	
"Extension"	2009	Salyu	Maiden Voyage	
"Mister Lonely" (ミスターロンリー)	2009	Chara	Carol	
"Days"	2009	Sachi Tainaka	Mariage: Tribute to Fate	
"Memory"	2009	Sachi Tainaka	Mariage: Tribute to Fate	
"Cruise"	2010	Salyu	Maiden Voyage	
"Voyage Call"	2010	Salyu	Maiden Voyage	
"Chiisa na Koi no Uta" (小さな恋のうた)	2010	Koda Kumi	Eternity: Love & Songs	
"Himitsu" (秘密)	2011	Maaya Sakamoto	You Can't Catch Me	
"Koigokoro" (恋心)	2011	Misato Watanabe	Serendipity	
"Futsū tte Iu Shiawase" (フツウっていう幸せ)	2011	Hatsune Okumura	Ototsumugi	
"Nakamura" (中村)	2012	Botchan	Takasakisen ni Notte	
"Aoiro Shinkokyū" (青色深呼吸)	2012	Botchan	Takasakisen ni Notte	
"Good Night, Morning"	2012	Botchan	Takasakisen ni Notte	
"Sensei, Boku wa" (先生、僕は)	2012	Botchan	Takasakisen ni Notte	
"Momiji" (もみじ)	2012	Botchan	Takasakisen ni Notte	
"Minna no Rule" (みんなのルール)	2012	Botchan	Takasakisen ni Notte	
"Mekuriwasureta Calendar" (めくり忘れたカレンダー)	2012	Botchan	Takasakisen ni Notte	
"Hotto Suru." (ホッとする。)	2012	Botchan	Takasakisen ni Notte	
"Kokoro wa Manner Mode" (心はマナーモード)	2012	Botchan	Takasakisen ni Notte	
"Guruguru Maki no Muffler" (ぐるぐる巻きのマフラー)	2012	Botchan	Takasakisen ni Notte	
"Takasaki-sen" (高崎線)	2012	Botchan	Takasakisen ni Notte	
"Planet" (プラネット)	2012	Chara	Cocoon	
"Koyoi no Tsuki no Yō ni" (今宵の月のよう)	2013	Koda Kumi	Color the Cover	
"Sunshine" (サンシャイン)	2013	Maaya Sakamoto	Singer Songwriter	
"Nikora" (ニコラ)	2013	Maaya Sakamoto	Singer Songwriter	
"Ask."	2013	Maaya Sakamoto	Singer Songwriter	
"Naritai" (なりたい)	2013	Maaya Sakamoto	Singer Songwriter	
"Boku no Hanbun" (僕の半分)	2013	Maaya Sakamoto	Singer Songwriter	
"Follow Me"	2015	Maaya Sakamoto	Follow Me Up	
"Road Movie" (ロードムービー)	2015	Maaya Sakamoto	Follow Me Up	
"Te o Tsunagō" (手をつなごう)	2017	Yoko Kuga	"Tsuki ni Naru" (single)	
"Hello, Hello" (ハロー、ハロー)	2018	Maaya Sakamoto	Non-album single	Anime Amanchu! theme song
"Ai nano" (アイナノ)	2018	Eyes	"Chocolate Love" (single)	
"Tokyo Buzzing Girl"	2018	Eyes	"Chocolate Love" (single)	
"Naihō Sareta Onna no Ko" (内包された女の子)	2019	Momo Hashidume	Honne to wa Minikukute mo Tōtoi	
"Reset" (リセット)	2019	Momo Hashidume	Honne to wa Minikukute mo Tōtoi	
"Yumeutsutsu" (夢現)	2019	Momo Hashidume	Honne to wa Minikukute mo Tōtoi	
"Kōzen no Himitsu" (公然の秘密)	2019	Momo Hashidume	Honne to wa Minikukute mo Tōtoi	
"Hero" (ヒーロー)	2019	Momo Hashidume	Honne to wa Minikukute mo Tōtoi	
"Love 2020"	2019	Hitomi	Non-album single	
"Fly My Way"	2019	Emiko Suzuki	"Fly My Way / Soul Full of Music" (single)	
"Hidden Notes"	2019	Maaya Sakamoyo	Kyō Dake no Ongaku	
"Back Home"	2020	Emiko Suzuki	After All	
