= List of Oricon number-one albums of 2002 =

These are the Oricon number one albums of 2002, per the Oricon Albums Chart.

== Chart history ==
Key
†	Indicates best-selling album of 2002

Issue Date	Album	Sales	Artist(s)
January 14	I Am...	1,751,360	Ayumi Hamasaki
January 21	Love Psychedelic Orchestra	325,060	Love Psychedelico
January 28	Love Psychedelic Orchestra	148,150	Love Psychedelico
February 4	Various Artists featuring Song Nation	81,140	Various Artists
February 11	Huma-rhythm	278,260	Hitomi
February 18	Tommy february6	190,560	Tommy february6
February 25	Tommy february6	164,380	Tommy february6
March 4	Jupiter	250,210	Bump of Chicken
March 11	Misia Greatest Hits	587,210	Misia
March 18	Misia Greatest Hits	561,190	Misia
March 25	Listen to My Heart	230,590	BoA
April 1	Do the Best	415,320	Do As Infinity
April 8	4th Ikimasshoi!	326,430	Morning Musume.
April 15	Ketsunopolis 2	251,390	Ketsumeishi
April 22	Ketsunopolis 2	90,130	Ketsumeishi
April 29	Message	88,160	Mongol800
May 6	Jiko Best	431,250	Kazumasa Oda
May 13	Jiko Best	531,630	Kazumasa Oda
May 20	It's a Wonderful World	640,150	Mr. Children
May 27	Power of Words	242,100	Rina Aiuchi
June 3	Stompin' On Down Beat Alley	150,120	Tokyo Ska Paradise Orchestra
June 10	Utaite Myōri: Sono Ichi	145,270	Ringo Shiina
June 17	The Official Album of the 2002 FIFA World Cup	65,180	Various Artists
June 24	Shanti	140,210	Hitomi Shimatani
July 1	Deep River †	2,350,170	Hikaru Utada
July 8	Deep River †	550,250	Hikaru Utada
July 15	Green	800,120	B'z
July 22	Hainumikaze	301,110	Chitose Hajime
July 29	Hainumikaze	128,190	Chitose Hajime
August 5	Tokyo Classic	410,160	Rip Slyme
August 12	Tokyo Classic	199,130	Rip Slyme
August 19	Rosso e Azzurro	170,560	Tsuyoshi Domoto
August 26	Tokyo Classic	84,680	Rip Slyme
September 2	Zenbu! Petitmoni	73,590	Petitmoni
September 9	True	451,230	Mika Nakashima
September 16	Self Portrait	342,100	Hitomi
September 23	Mikazuki Rock	238,110	Spitz
September 30	Unity Roots & Family, Away	280,130	Glay
October 7	Kiss in the Sky	410,060	Misia
October 14	Kiss in the Sky	173,640	Misia
October 21	Shian	340,110	Koshi Inaba
October 28	I/flancy	67,150	Hitomi Yaida
November 4	Fairy Tale	404,010	Mai Kuraki
November 11	Rarities	140,120	Tatsuro Yamashita
November 18	Resistance	132,150	Mika Nakashima
November 25	Resistance	43,140	Mika Nakashima
December 2	Stamp	94,106	Chage & Aska
December 9	Top of The Pops	961,220	Keisuke Kuwata
December 16	Top of The Pops	238,784	Keisuke Kuwata
December 23	The Ballads: Love & B'z	1,050,125	B'z
December 30	Rainbow	1,016,482	Ayumi Hamasaki

== Annual ==
- Number-one album of 2002: Deep River by Hikaru Utada.
- Most weeks at number-one: Misia with a total of 4 weeks.

== See also ==
- 2002 in music
