= Love & Life =

Love & Life may refer to:

- Love & Life (Eric Benét album), 2008
- Love & Life (LaToya London album), 2005
- Love & Life (Mary J. Blige album), 2003
- Love & Life: The Very Best of Diana Ross, 2001
- Love and Life, an album by Morris Albert, 1977
- Love and Life, a painting by George Frederic Watts

== See also ==
- Love & Life, The Album, a 2012 album by Dok2
- Love & Live (disambiguation)
- Love Life (disambiguation)
