= Self Portrait (Hitomi album) =

Compilation album by Hitomi

Greatest hits album by Hitomi
- Released: September 4, 2002
- Genre: J-pop
- Length: 62:27
- Label: Avex Trax

Hitomi chronology
Huma-rhythm (2002)	Self Portrait (2002)	HTM: Tiartrop Fles (2003)

Singles from Self Portrait
- 1. "Understanding" Released: February 14, 2002; 2. "Flow", "Blade Runner" Released: August 21, 2002

Self Portrait (stylized as SELF PORTRAIT) is the second greatest hits album by Japanese singer and songwriter Hitomi. It was released through Avex Trax on September 4, 2002, coinciding with the video album Hitomi Live Tour 2002 Huma-Rhythm. The two-disc compilation spanned Hitomi's eight-year career at that point; viewing it as the beginning of a fresh start, she devised a release "atypical" of the traditional greatest hits format.

The first half of Self Portrait showcases material released after her previous compilation, H (1999), whereas the second half features new renditions of her earlier work, as well as one new song: "Vibes". It includes the single "Understanding", released merely weeks after her last album earlier that year, and a live recording of "Flow".

Self Portrait debuted at number one on the Oricon Weekly Charts. It went on to become Hitomi's longest-charting album at twenty weeks, selling 636,000 copies in total and becoming the twenty-first highest selling album of 2002. Self Portrait received generally positive reviews from music critics, who commented on her artistic growth. At the 17th Japan Gold Disc Awards, the release received an accolade for Rock & Pop Album of the Year.

== Background and development ==
In February 1999, Avex Trax released Hitomi's first greatest hits album, H. It chronicled her work with music producer Tetsuya Komuro, whose managerial role dissolved the year prior as Hitomi sought greater creative control over her career. Hitomi subsequently began working with Zentaro Watanabe and Dai Nagano; her next album Thermo Plastic (1999), matched the prior success she attained under Komuro, which "[laid] to rest fears that she would struggle without her onetime mentor."

In July 2002, the website Yeah!! J-Pop! reported that Hitomi would be releasing a new best album (ベストアルバム), then-untitled. In an interview with CD Data magazine, Hitomi explained that H (1999) felt like she was "looking back on the past," whereas Self Portrait is deemed as a "halfway stage" towards "an ideal I want to reach," further marking the release as "a declaration that I will continue 'sketching' from this point on, too." She developed the compilation after a period of reflection, stating:

"In turning 25, the feeling of wanting to change in my own way grew stronger and stronger. I am understanding that to become an adult is based upon various things. For example, if we assume that there is good and evil, rather than asserting that it's “good” or “bad”... in light of the fact that [good and evil] are coexisting in the world and in mankind, I wonder if one must then grow up."

Hitomi had a desire to introduce fans of "Samurai Drive" and "Love 2000" to songs like "There Is..." and "Taion" (体温, "Body Temperature"), which she considered to be "a selection that make up a key point in [my] past". From this, the idea of rearrangements came about, and Hitomi turned her focus towards fashioning a "rebirth" for her Komuro-era songs. In speaking to Beat Freak, during the album's development, it became a topic that she thought it would be "boring to just release an ordinary best album," noting that little time had passed since H three years prior. Hitomi told the magazine that: "I feel that this best album is like a new start for me. [...] I've been wanting to seek someone different from who I am right now."

== Composition and material ==
Self Portrait is presented as a two-disc release, delineating Hitomi's career into two distinct periods. Whereas the second half of Self Portrait is distinguished by Hitomi's early work under music producer Testuya Komuro, the introductory half chronicles her collaboration with Zentaro Watanabe.

The first disc contains nearly every single from Thermo Plastic (1999), Love Life (2000), and Huma-rhythm (2002), bar "Inner Child", "Wish" and "Made to be in Love" from their triple A-side release with "Kimi no Tonari" (君のとなり). The singles "Maria" and "Kimi no Tonari" are rearrangements found on their parent albums, with the latter being a first press bonus track originally. Furthermore, the disc includes the album tracks "Fat Free" and "Why?".

The second disc is a selection of singles from Go to the Top (1995), By Myself (1996) and Déjà-vu (1997), otherwise known as her Komuro era. Each Komuro song was re-recorded, though new arrangements accompany "Candy Girl", "Busy Now" and "In the Future". "Go to the Top" is a "duet" between Hitomi's original and newly-recorded vocals. In addition, the second disc features a live recording of "Flow" performed at the Nippon Budokan, and new song "Vibes".

== Release and promotion ==
The album artwork was photographed by longtime collaborator Hidekazu Maiyama in Sicily, Italy; a photo book chronicling the ten-day shoot was published two months later with the same cover. The concert DVD Hitomi Live Tour 2002 Huma-Rhythm, whose release coincided with the Self Portrait compilation, utilizes a similar photograph.

Hitomi made extensive TV promotions throughout August and September 2002, including a performance of "Flow" on the August 26, 2002, broadcast of Hey! Hey Hey! Music Champ, and subsequent appearances on NHK Sokuhō! Uta no Daijiten! (速報! 歌の大辞テン!) on September 11, and NHK BS2 Hits on! Live on September 19, 2002. The compilation was further supported by a two-day concert at the Yoyogi National Stadium; entitled Hitomi Count Down Live 2002 Self Portrait, it was held on December 30 and 31, 2002, in the venue's second gymnasium.

== Track listing ==
All lyrics are written by Hitomi except where noted, all arrangement by Zentaro Watanabe except where noted. All music on disc two composed by Tetsuya Komuro except where noted.

Disc one
No.	Title	Lyrics	Music	Arrangement	Length
1.	"Love 2000" (from Love Life, 2000)		Masato Kamato		4:25
2.	"There Is..." (from Thermo Plastic, 1999)		Dai Nagao		4:42
3.	"Kimi ni Kiss" (キミにKISS) (from Love Life)		Kunio Tago		5:38
4.	"Fat Free" (from Love Life)		Tago		4:07
5.	"Maria (Love Life Version)" (from Love Life)	Hitomi, Tago	Tago		5:15
6.	"Taion" (体温) (from Thermo Plastic)		Watanabe		4:47
7.	"Is it You?" (from Huma-rhythm, 2002)		Kosuke Morimoto		4:51
8.	"Samurai Drive" (from Huma-rhythm)	Ryozo Kobayashi	Cune		4:21
9.	"Innocence" (from Huma-rhythm)		Masato Kitano		5:26
10.	"I Am" (from Huma-rhythm)		Kitano		4:46
11.	"Understanding"		Morimoto	Keiji Matsui	4:52
12.	"Why?" (from Huma-rhythm)		Kitano		5:20
13.	"Kimi no Tonari (Thermo Plastic Version)" (君のとなり) (from Thermo Plastic)		Hitomi	Ryo Yoshimata	3:48

Disc two
No.	Title	Lyrics	Music	Arrangement	Length
1.	"Candy Girl (Self Portrait Version)" (from Go to the Top, 1995)				4:36
2.	"Busy Now (Self Portrait Version)" (from Déjà-vu, 1997)	Hitomi, Takahiro Maeda	Cozy Kubo	Yukihiro Fukutomi	4:34
3.	"In the Future (Self Portrait Version)" (from By Myself, 1996)	Hitomi, Komuro			4:43
4.	"Go to the Top (Now & Then Version)" (from Go to the Top)			Kubo, Komuro	4:36
5.	"Problem (Self Portrait Version)" (from Déjà-vu)			Komuro	4:54
6.	"By Myself (Self Portrait Version)" (from By Myself)			Ken Shima	5:00
7.	"Vibes"		Akio	Akio	3:08
8.	"Flow (6.14 Budokan Live Version)"		Akinori Suzuki	Tatsumi	5:29

Notes

- A majority of the song titles are stylized in all caps (e.g. "LOVE 2000", "IS IT YOU?", "SAMURAI DRIVE")
- "There Is...", "Innocence", "Kimi no Tonari (Thermo Plastic Version)", "Problem", "By Myself" and "Flow" are stylized in lowercase letters
- "I Am" and "In the Future" are stylized using sentence case (e.g. "In the future")

== Chart performance ==
According to SoundScan Japan, Self Portrait debuted at number one and moved 275,440 copies in its first week. It held steady within the top five in its next two weeks, and marked 541,899 copies in total before it dropped out of the top twenty in its eighth week.

The compilation performed similarly on the Oricon Weekly Album Chart, where it debuted at number one and charted for twenty weeks in total. Self Portrait sold over 636,000 copies in total by the end of 2002. Self Portrait debuted and peaked at number seven on the Japan Top Albums chart according to the October 5, 2002, edition of Billboard magazine.

== HTM: Tiartrop Fles ==
HTM: Tiartrop Fles

Compilation album by Hitomi
- Released: October 16, 2003
- Genre: J-pop
- Label: Avex Trax

Hitomi chronology
Self Portrait (2002)	HTM: Tiartrop Fles (2003)	Traveler (2004)

HTM: Tiartrop Fles (stylized as HTM〜TIARTROP FLES〜) is a compilation album by Japanese singer and songwriter Hitomi. It was released on October 16, 2003, through Avex Trax. Promoted as a companion to Self Portrait (2002), the album collects B-sides or coupling songs (カップリング曲) that were not previously included on Love Life (2000), Huma-rhythm (2002) or Self Portrait itself.

Its last four tracks make earlier appearances in other forms, with "Plastic Time Machine (8・2・1 Version)" and "Innocence (Regenerated Version)" being rearrangements, "My Planet" appearing on the Song Nation (2002) charity album, and "Elephant Love" on Doppler (2002) by Atami. "Blade Runner" is technically one-half of a double A-side single.

Tiartrop Fles charted for five weeks on the Oricon, peaking at number nineteen.

=== Tracklisting ===
All lyrics are written by Hitomi except where noted, all arrangement by Zentaro Watanabe except where noted.

No.	Title	Lyrics	Music	Arrangement	Length
1.	"Fighting Girl" (from "Inner Child")		Shintaro Hagiwara		5:29
2.	"Blade Runner" (from "Flow/Blade Runner")		Maho Fukami		3:56
3.	"7 (Seven)" (from "Samurai Drive")		Dai Nagao	Tasuku	3:43
4.	"Eien to iu Kategorī" (永遠というカテゴリー) (from "Maria")		Kunio Tago		4:27
5.	"Aidoru wo Sagase (La plus belle pour aller danser)" (アイドルを探せ) (from "Love 2000")	Charles Aznavour	Georges Garvarentz		3:15
6.	"Destiny" (from "Love 2000")		Masato Kamata		4:32
7.	"Purasutīkku Taimu Mashīn (8・2・1 Version)" (プラスティックタイムマシーン) (from "Flow/Blade Runner")	Ryōzō Kobayashi	Cune		4:49
8.	"Innocence (Regenerated Version)" (from "Samurai Drive")		Masato Kitano	Tatsumi Moritoki	6:39
9.	"My Planet" (from "Understanding")		Tetsuya Komuro	Komuro	6:39
10.	"Erefanto Rabu (Atami feat. Hitomi)" (エレファントラブ)		Watanabe		5:06
