= Love Life =

Love Life or Lovelife may refer to:

== Organizations ==
- loveLife South Africa, a youth focused HIV prevention initiative in South Africa
- Love Life, a campaign started by Blackie Chen and Christine Fan to benefit children suffering from cancer

== Film and television ==
- Lovelife, a 1996 romantic comedy film
- Love Life (2006 film), directed by Damion Dietz
- Love Life (2007 film), also known as Liebesleben, Israeli/German film directed by Maria Schrader based on a novel by Zeruya Shalev
- Love Life (2022 film), a Japanese drama
- Love Life (British TV series), a British series on ITV
- True Love (TV series), a 2012 BBC series, previously called Love Life
- Love Life (American TV series), an American series on HBO Max

== Music ==
- Love Life (musical), a 1948 musical by Kurt Weill and Alan Jay Lerner
- A short-lived band that became Celebration

=== Albums ===
- Love Life (Hitomi album), a 2000 album by Japanese singer Hitomi
  - Love Life 2, a 2009 sequel album by Hitomi
- Lovelife (album), a 1996 album by shoegaze band Lush
- Love Life (Berlin album), a 1984 album by American new wave band Berlin
- Love Life (Ray Price album) 1964 album by Ray Price
- Love Life (Tamia album), a 2015 album by Canadian singer Tamia
- Love Life (Brenda Russell album), a 1981 album by American singer Brenda Russell

=== Songs ===
- "Love Life" (song), a song written by the Pet Shop Boys and first recorded by Alcazar
- "LoveLife", a 2011 song by Kate Ryan
- "Love Life", a song by The Rutles parodying "All You Need Is Love" by The Beatles
- "Love Life", a song by Doja Cat from the album Scarlet, 2023
- "Love Life", a song by Netsky
- "Lovelife", a song by Take That from III

== See also ==
- Love of Life, an American soap opera
- "Love the Life", a 1992 song by Bass Culture
- We Love Life, a 2001 album by Pulp
- Sex life
