= Go My Way =

Go My Way may refer to:

- "Go My Way" (Hitomi Yaida song), 2006
- "Go My Way" (Hitomi Furuya song), 2006
- "Go My Way", a song by Krokus, from the 2003 album Rock the Block
- "Go My Way!!", a song from The Idolmaster (video game)

== See also ==
- Going My Way, a 1944 film
