= Go to the Top =

Go to the Top may refer to:

- Go to the Top (album), a 1995 album by Hitomi
- "Go to the Top" (song), a 2012 single by Koda Kumi
