= Love & Live =

Love & Live may refer to:

- Love & Live (album), a 2009 album by Jolin Tsai
- Love & Live (EP), a 2017 EP by South Korean girl group sub-unit Loona 1/3 and its title track
