= World! Wide! Love! =

Single by Hitomi

from the album Love Life 2
- B-side: "ココロの草原"
- Released: May 20, 2009
- Recorded: Aoyama, Tokyo, Japan
- Genre: Pop-rock
- Length: 15:13 (CD)
- Label: Love Life Records (Subsidiary of Avex Trax)
- Songwriter(s): Hitomi Furuya
- Producer(s): Hiroyuki Fujino, Hiroki

Hitomi singles chronology
"Fight for Your Run" (2008)	"World! Wide! Love!" (2009)	"Umarete Kurete Arigato/Smile World" (2011)

"World! Wide! Love!" is the 33rd physical single and 34th single overall by Japanese singer-songwriter Hitomi and was released on May 20, 2009 by Avex Trax. "World! Wide! Love!" is the second single from, and is set to appear on, Hitomi's ninth studio album, "Love Life 2".

== Background ==
While there were many rumors that Hitomi was going to retire, they were quickly disbanded when her 34th single, "Sagashi Tsuduketeta Mono/World! Wide! Love!", a double a-side featuring a "pop ballad", was announced to be released on January 28, 2009. However, this single was soon cancelled for unknown reasons. Not long after, another single release, tentatively titled, "Birth", was soon scheduled on online stores to release a month later, on February 18, 2009, in both a CD-only and CD+DVD edition. Once again, however, this single release was cancelled for unknown reasons. Finally, however, her ninth studio album, then untitled, was confirmed by online retailers and Hitomi's official website. Soon after, "World! Wide! Love!" was announced. The title track was used in skincare product "Easuterinie" commercials, and was also a tie-in song for the "Bee TV" series in Japan. Both "World! Wide! Love!" and the b-side "Kokoro no Sogen" will appear on Hitomi's upcoming album "Love Life 2".

== Music video ==
The promotional video does not feature Hitomi herself; rather, it depicts a girl in a long t-shirt walking around a school campus. As she walks, more girls join her and wear part of the girl's long t-shirt. The beginning of the video features a spoken, robotic message (most likely from Hitomi herself), and the song used in the video prior to release of Love Life 2 uses a more vocoded voice than the version on the single. This vocoder version appeared on the CD Love Life 2 However, the version of the video on the CD+DVD version of Love Life 2 uses the single mix.

== Track listing ==
#	Title	Lyrics	Composers	Arrangers	Time
01	"World! Wide! Love!"	Hitomi Furuya	Hiroyuki Fujino	Hiroyuki Fujino	4:20
02	"ココロの草原"	Hitomi Furuya	Hiroyuki Fujino	Hiroki	3:37
03	"World! Wide! Love! (Instrumental)"		Hiroyuki Fujino	Hiroyuki Fujino	4:21
04	"ココロの草原 (Instrumental)"		Hiroyuki Fujino	Hiroki	3:35

== Charts ==
Oricon Sales Chart (Japan)

Release	Chart	Peak position	Sales total	Chart run
May 20, 2009	Oricon Daily Albums Chart			
May 20, 2009	Oricon Weekly Albums Chart	119	645	1 week
May 20, 2009	Oricon Monthly Albums Chart			
May 20, 2009	Oricon Yearly Albums Chart			
