= Spirit (Hitomi album) =

Studio album by Hitomi
- Released: April 27, 2011
- Genre: J-pop; electropop; synthpop; pop rock
- Length: 39:40
- Language: Japanese; English
- Label: Maximum 10
- Producer: Advanced Alternative Media

Hitomi chronology
Love Life 2 (2009)	Spirit (2011)	Special (2011)

Spirit (stylized as SPIRIT) is the tenth studio album by Japanese singer and songwriter Hitomi. It was released on April 27, 2011, through independent label Maximum 10. It is her first not to be handled by Avex Trax, though both are owned by the same operating company. Spirit is described as "electro-oriented club music married with emo rock"; produced by Advanced Alternative Media, the album is noted as "their first collaboration with a Japanese artist".

Looking to expand her sound, Hitomi largely worked with Western record producers Scott Cutler, Anne Preven and Dreamlab. Spirit features contributions from Gabe Saporta of Cobra Starship, Rivers Cuomo of Weezer, and members from Simple Plan.

Though no singles were issued to promote Spirit directly, the album includes the digital single "Love Me Love Body" which was released a year prior. Spirit debuted and peaked at number 125, spending one week on the Oricon Weekly Chart. The album was supported by the Hitomi Live Tour 2011: Spirit, her first in five years, which visited three cities in early June 2011.

== Background and development ==
Hitomi released her last studio album, Love Life 2, in June 2009, which attracted attention as she was photographed nude and visibly pregnant for its album artwork.

Two weeks prior to the release of Spirit, various media outlets publicized Hitomi's departure from Avex Trax to a then-unnamed independent label. The announcement of her new album and its April 27, 2011, release date accompanied these reports, though no further details were communicated from Hitomi or her management's side. Her move to Maximum 10 was formally announced on April 20, 2011, as well as Advanced Alternative Media's involvement in the album.

In an interview with Natalie, Hitomi explained that her initial feeling towards the transfer was along the lines of, "What is an 'indie' in the first place?" She states: "If a major label says, 'We will sell [your albums], and you will gain merit as well', then an indie [label] only had the recognition of something kinda like a flea market. However, I was certain that it was time to search for an approach different from before."

No singles were released for promoting the album, although two songs were made available to the public prior to its release. The song "Love Me, Love Body" was used as the official theme song to Coca-Cola Japan's healthy drink for women "Love Body", and was digitally released on July 28, 2010. "Song for You" was the other song previously released. It was included in Hitomi's single "Umarete Kurete Arigatō", which was her last single released under the Avex label. The last songs that Hitomi published under the Avex major label, "Umarete Kurete Arigatō" and "Smile World" (the two A-side songs of her last major single), along with the theme songs of the NHK anime television series Hanakappa, "Special" and "Guru Maze Yeah", were not included on the album.

""Rollin' wit da Homies" is a duet of Hitomi and Weezer vocalist Rivers Cuomo, making this song the first collaboration of Hitomi and another artist included in some of her studio albums. The album did not have any physical single to promote it, and peaked at nº 125 on its first week in the Oricon charts. First pressings of the album sold at Tower Records included a limited edition poster.

== Track listing ==
Spirit track listing
No.	Title	Lyrics	Music	Producer(s)	Length
1.	"Hands Up!!"	Sam Hollander, Dave Katz, Shep Goodman, Gabe Saporta	Hollander, Katz, Goodman, Saporta	S*A*M*, Sluggo	3:27
2.	"Time Machine"	The Cowboy Blasters	Scott Cutler, Anne Preven, Christian Berishaj	Cutler, Preven, Christian TV	3:08
3.	"Private Flower"	Hitomi	Hitomi, Leah Haywood, Daniel James, Shelly Peiken	Dreamlab	3:09
4.	"2010: Kanemōke no Heaven & Paradise (2010 ～金儲けのHeaven & Paradise～, Heaven & Paradise of Making Money)"	Hitomi	Chris Rojas, Laura Pergolizzi	Rojas	2:29
5.	"Lights On" (featuring Adskillz)	Hitomi	Jimmy Harry, Haywood, James	Harry, Dreamlab	3:15
6.	"Spirit"	Hitomi	Cutler, Preven, Chuck Comeau, Pierre Bouvier	Cutler, Preven	3:10
7.	"Sweet & Honey"	Hitomi	Harry, Cathy Dennis	Harry, Dennis	3.48
8.	"Love Me, Love Body"	Hitomi	Cutler, Preven, BC Jean	Cutler, Preven	3:52
9.	"Freedom"	Hitomi	Cutler, Preven, Kevin Rudolf, Makeba Riddick	Cutler, Preven, Rudolf	3:14
10.	"Supernova"	SHG-NKM, Hitomi	Haywood, James	Dreamlab	3:19
11.	"Song for You"	Hitomi	Cutler, Preven, Eric Hudson	Cutler, Preven, Hudson	3:32
12.	"Rollin' wit da Homies" (featuring Rivers Cuomo)	Rivers Cuomo, Sheppard Solomon, Allan Grigg	Cuomo, Solomon, Grigg	Kool Kojak	3:17
Total length:					39:40

== Charts ==
Oricon chart performance
Date	Chart	Peak position	Sales total
April 27, 2011	Oricon Daily Albums Chart	33	
April 27, 2011	Oricon Weekly Albums Chart	125	1,055
April 27, 2011	Oricon Indie Albums Chart	6	
