= Let's Play Winter =

Single by Hitomi

from the album Go to the Top
- B-side: "Pleasure"
- Released: November 28, 1994
- Recorded: Aoyama, Tokyo, Japan
- Genre: Dance-pop; R&B
- Length: 22:43 (CD)
- Label: Avex Trax
- Songwriter(s): Hitomi Furuya
- Producer(s): Tetsuya Komuro; Cozy Kubo

Hitomi singles chronology
| "Let's Play Winter" (1994) | "We Are "Lonely Girl"" (1995) |

"Let's Play Winter" is the debut single by Japanese singer-songwriter Hitomi and was released on November 28, 1994 by Avex Trax. It appears as a remixed version on her 1995 debut studio album Go to the Top and was later included in its original form on the 1999 best-of compilation H and the 2007 three disc set Peace.

== Background ==
"Let's Play Winter" was the first commercially available single from Hitomi. Produced by the then-popular music producer Tetsuya Komuro and Cozy Kubo, it surprisingly did not chart on the Oricon. Hitomi was, at the time, among the first artists part of the flagship label Avex Trax, which was quickly signing other new artists, and this is most likely the reason for the single's failure to sell well. "Let's Play Winter" and the b-side "Pleasure" were written by Furuya and the a-side was used as the 1994 Nippon TV "Action! Snow Board" ending theme song.

== Music video ==
The promotional video shows Hitomi in various, different colored rooms, wearing different outfits, such as a grey sweater or pink sequined tank top, and doing minimal activity, such as playing with her dog, lying in bed, and dancing. This video marked the first appearance of Furuya's trademark mini-skirt/high-heels combo and provocative image.

== Track listing ==
All lyrics are written by Hitomi Furuya; all music is composed by Tetsuya Komuro, arranged by Tetsuya Komuro & Cozy Kubo

CD
| No. | Title | Length |
|---|---|---|
| 1. | "Let's Play Winter" (Original Mix) | 5:17 |
| 2. | "Pleasure" (Original Mix) | 6:05 |
| 3. | "Let's Play Winter" (Original Karaoke^{1}) | 5:17 |
| 4. | "Pleasure" (Original Karaoke^{1}) | 6:04 |

- ^{1}Instrumental
