= We Are "Lonely Girl" =

Single by Hitomi

from the album Go to the Top
- B-side: "Tokyoのど真んなかBUSの中で"
- Released: February 22, 1995
- Recorded: Aoyama, Tokyo, Japan
- Genre: Synthpop
- Length: 21:04 (CD)
- Label: Avex Trax
- Songwriter(s): Hitomi Furuya
- Producer(s): Cozy Kubo, No! Galers

Hitomi singles chronology
"Let's Play Winter" (1994)	"We Are "Lonely Girl"" (1995)	"Candy Girl" (1995)

"We Are "Lonely Girl"" is the second single by Japanese singer-songwriter Hitomi and was released on February 22, 1995 by Avex Trax. It appears remixed on her debut studio album Go to the Top and in its original form on the 1999 best-of H and on the 2007 three disc set Peace.

== Background ==
"We Are "Lonely Girl"" was the second single release from Hitomi. Using the popular synthpop style in the Japanese music industry at the time, and featuring composition by Tetsuya Komuro and production by Cozy Kubo, this single managed to chart on the Oricon, becoming her first charting single and first single to chart in the Oricon Top 100. Hitomi also wrote this song, which uses deeply personal lyrical content. To further promote the song, Avex Trax agreed to let it become the commercial tie-in song for NTT DoCoMo "Berumi" commercials.

== Music video ==
The promotional video showcases a black-and-white contrasting technique, highlighting Hitomi's features. Because of this, the video has a noticeably more serious tone than Hitomi's last video. Hitomi is shown doing various activities, such as getting dressed, putting on make-up, relaxing in her room, and reminiscing. Hitomi is also shown wearing various outfits, including lingerie. Like the music video for "Let's Play Winter", there are many close-up shots of Hitomi's face.

== Track listing ==
All lyrics are written by Hitomi Furuya.

CD
No.	Title	Music	Arranger(s)	Length
1.	"We Are Lonely Girl" (Radio Mix)	Tetsuya Komuro	Cozy Kubo, Mixed by Dave Ford	4:59
2.	"We Are Lonely Girl" (Club Mix)	Tetsuya Komuro	Cozy Kubo	6:49
3.	"We Are Lonely Girl" (Instrumental)	Tetsuya Komuro	Tetsuya Komuro, Cozy Kubo	5:00
4.	"Tokyo no Domannaka Bus no Naka de (Tokyoのど真んなかBUSの中で, Right in the middle of Tokyo, In a Bus)" (Radio Mix)	No! Galers, Tetsuya Komuro	No! Galers	4:56

== Charts ==
Oricon Sales Chart (Japan)

Release	Chart	Peak position	Sales total
February 22, 1995	Oricon Weekly Albums Chart	61	18,980
