= Go My Way (Hitomi Furuya song) =

Single by Hitomi

from the album Love Concent
- Released: May 10, 2006
- Recorded: 2006
- Genre: J-pop
- Length: 4:19
- Label: Love Life Records
- Songwriter: Hitomi

Hitomi singles chronology
"'Cra"g"y Mama'" (2005)	"Go My Way" (2006)	"'Ai no Kotoba'" (2006)

"Go My Way" is Hitomi's 4th single from her album "Love Concent" and 31st single overall.

== Overview ==
The lyrics for "Go My Way" and the b-side, "Lost Emotion in Darkness", were written by Hitomi herself.

"Go My Way" was used as the opening and ending theme to the Japanese drama "Bengoshi No Kuzu" (Scum Lawyer Kuzu,) which aired on TBS. Hitomi appeared in the 6th episode to advertise her single release of the song. During the ending sequence, Hitomi also made a brief cameo.

This has been Hitomi's most successful single since "Japanese Girl" was released on June 1, 2005. "Lost Emotion in Darkness" has been the only b-side by Hitomi to be featured on her new album "Love Concent".

== PV ==
The PV for this song features Hitomi dancing, and shows her in different outfits. The video also shows multiple scenes of a bird, known as the Galah cockatoo, flying across a room in slow motion.

== Track listing ==
All lyrics are written by Hitomi.

CD
No.	Title	Music	Arranger(s)	Length
1.	"Go My Way"	Akimitsu Honma	Zentaro Watanabe	4:19
2.	"Lost Emotion in Darkness"	Hitomi	Zentaro Watanabe	4:29
3.	"Go My Way" (instrumental)	Akimitsu Honma	Zentaro Watanabe	4:19

== Charts ==
Oricon Sales Chart (Japan)

Release	Chart	Peak position	First week sales	Sales total
10 May 2006	Oricon Daily Charts	16		
10 May 2006	Oricon Weekly Charts	22	8,105 copies	11,715 copies
