= List of Rurouni Kenshin soundtracks =

The music of the 1996 anime television series Rurouni Kenshin was composed by Noriyuki Asakura. Four soundtrack albums were released. Two Songs albums, containing tracks performed by the Japanese voice actors, were also released.

== Rurouni Kenshin: The Original Soundtrack ==
Rurouni Kenshin -Meiji Kenkaku Roman Tan- The Original Soundtrack (るろうに剣心 –明治剣客浪漫譚–) was released on April 1, 1996.

No.	Title	Music	Length
1.	"Overture - Kimi wa Dare wo Mamotte Iru (Strings Version)" (Overture - Who are You Protecting)		2:22
2.	"Opening Theme Sobakasu" (, Freckles)	Judy and Mary	4:14
3.	"Kimi wa Dare wo Mamotte Iru (Original Mix)" (Who are You Protecting)		2:42
4.	"Himura Kenshin (Original Mix)"		2:19
5.	"Himura Kenshin (Gut Guitar Version)"		2:29
6.	"Hiten Mitsurugi ryu" (Kenshin's Battle Mode)		2:12
7.	"Tsuyoku Naritai (A Theme of Yahiko Myoujin)" (I Want to Get Stronger)		1:16
8.	"Aku Ichi Monji (A Theme of Sanosuke Sagara)" (One Word: Evil)		1:40
9.	"Kamiya Kashin ryu" (Kamiya Kashin's Battle Mode)		1:55
10.	"Kamiya Kaoru (Gut Guitar Version)"		1:53
11.	"Omoi: Odorenai Warutsu (Gut Guitar Version)" (Thoughts: Undanceable Waltz)		1:11
12.	"Aku no Ichi ~Shinji Rugayueni~ (A Theme of The Oniya Banshu)" (Evil One ~Reason to Believe~)		1:30
13.	"Aku no Ni ~Mou Hitotsu no Ishin~ (A Theme of Shishio)" (Evil Two ~One more Ishin~)		1:13
14.	"Aku no San ~Satsui no Uragawa~ (A Theme of The Dark Side of Your Heart)" (Evil Three ~The Other Side of Murderous Intent~)		2:13
15.	"Kamiya Dojo (A Theme of Kenshin's Family)"		1:23
16.	"Ayame to Suzume (A Theme of Kenshin's Family)" (Ayame and Suzume)		1:35
17.	"Gyuunabe de Paatto! (A theme of Akabeko)" (Celebrate with beef bowl!)		1:24
18.	"Demo ne! Honto wa ne!..." (But! Really!)		1:17
19.	"Kenjutsu Komachi (Kaoru's Theme)" (Sword Technique Beauty)		2:13
20.	"Kimi wa dare wo Mamotte Iru (Acoustic Version)" (Who are You Protecting)		2:41
21.	"Omoi: Odorenai Warutsu (Strings version)" ((Thoughts: Undanceable Waltz))		1:55
22.	"Kamiya Kaoru (Kaoru's Love Theme - Original Mix)"		2:15
23.	"Kimi wa dare wo Mamotte Iru (Electric Guitar Version)" (Who are You Protecting)		2:29
Total length:			55:48

== Rurouni Kenshin: The Original Soundtrack II ==
Rurouni Kenshin -Meiji Kenkaku Roman Tan- The Original Soundtrack II -DEPARTURE- (るろうに剣心 –明治剣客浪漫譚– オリジナル・サウンドトラック II —DEPARTURE—) was released on October 21, 1996.

No.	Title	Length
1.	"Unmei no Hagaruma ~Kyoto e no Purorogu~" (「運命の歯車」～京都へのプロローグ～, Destiny's Wheels ~Prologue to going to Kyoto~)	3:49
2.	"The Last Wolf Suite ~Shishio Makoto no Kumikyoku~ I. Cold Heart ~A theme of Soujirou~ II. The Land of Anger III. Juppon Gatana IV. Death Parade V. The Last Wolf ~A theme of Shishio Makoto~ VI. Red Rain VII. Chi no In (Red Stamp)" (「The Last Wolf Suite」～志々雄真実の組曲～, The Last Wolf Suite ~Shishio Makoto's groups music~)	6:48
3.	"Hoeru Miburo ~A theme of Saitou Hajime~" (「蘇える壬生狼」—A theme of 斉藤 一—, Howling Wolf)	2:17
4.	"Departure (Piano + Acoustic Guitar Version)"	1:54
5.	"Nihon Meisou ~Ishin no Yami~" (「日本迷走」～維新の闇～, Japan Running Amok ~The Darkness of Ishin~)	2:01
6.	"March of Ghost ~Bourei no Koushin~" (「March of Ghost」～亡霊の行進～, March of Ghost ~Ghosts walking~)	1:41
7.	"Run to You ~A theme of Sagara Sanosuke~" (「Run To You」— A theme of 相楽左之助—)	2:24
8.	"Frozen Flare - Shura no Fuuin-" (「Frozen Flare」—修羅の封印—, Frozen Flare -The Seal of No Feelings-)	1:48
9.	"Welcome To My Nightmare -Youkoso, Akumu he-" (「Welcome To My Nightmare」—ようこそ、悪夢へ—, Welcome to My Nightmare -Welcome to My Nightmare-)	1:06
10.	"Dancing with Devils -Saishuuheiki 1996-" (「Dancing with Devils」—最終兵器 1996—, Dancing with Devils -Last Weapon 1996-)	2:52
11.	"Batousai Futatabi..." (「抜刀斎再び・・・」, (Batousai Again...))	1:20
12.	"[Starless] -Tsuki mo naku, Hoshi mo naku- (Acoustic Guitar Version)" (「Starless」—月も無く、星も無く— , Starless -No Moon, No Stars-)	1:08
13.	"Departure (Master Mix)"	5:10
14.	"[Starless] -Tsuki mo naku, Hoshi mo naku- (Master Mix)" (「Starless」—月も無く、星も無く—, Starless -No Moon, No Stars-)	3:59
15.	"Kimi wa dare wo Mamotte Iru (Hard Version)" (「君は誰を守っている・・・」, Who are You Protecting)	1:15
Total length:		39:50

== Rurouni Kenshin. The Original Soundtrack III ==
Rurouni Kenshin -Meiji Kenkaku Roman Tan- Original Soundtrack III -Kyoto Kessen- (るろうに剣心 –明治剣客浪漫譚– オリジナル・サウンドトラック III —京都決戦—, lit. Rurouni Kenshin: Romantic Tales of a Meiji Swordsman The Original Soundtrack III -Kyoto Decisive Battle-) was released on April 21, 1997.

No.	Title	Music	Length
1.	"Hiten Mitsuryugiryu - Amakakeruryu no Hirameki - A theme of Hiko Seijunrou" (「飛天御剣流・天翔龍閃」—A theme of 比古清十郎—)		4:25
2.	"Fallen Angel -Haiiro no Tenshi-" (「Fallen Angel —灰色の天使—」, Grey Angel)		6:03
3.	"Kaoru to Misao I (Gut Guitar Version)" (「薫と操〈I〉」)		1:32
4.	"Ishin Tenpuku Keikaku" (「維新転覆計画」, The Ishin Overthrow Plan)		4:56
5.	"Sakura no Ki no Shita ni -Shisha no Shi-" (「桜の木の下に —死者の詩—」, Underneath the Cherry Blossom Tree - Poem of the Dead))		3:42
6.	"Kaoru to Misao II (Pf Version)" (「薫と操〈II〉」)		1:46
7.	"Reppuu - A theme of Hiko" (「烈風」—a theme of 比古清十郎—, (Violent Wind))		1:16
8.	"Oniwa Banshu - Kyoto Tansakugata" (「御庭番衆・京都探索方」, Oniwabanshu - Kyoto Investigation Team)		3:08
9.	"Warriors Blue - A theme of Shinomori Aoshi" (「Warriors Blue」—A theme of 四乃森蒼紫—)		1:58
10.	"Kaoru to Misao III (Full Mix Version)" (「薫と操〈III〉」)		3:42
11.	"Warriors Suite I. Retsuen II. Kako e no Ranbu (Wild Dance to the Past) III. TORAWARE (Captive) IV. Warriors"		8:30
12.	"NA-GO-MI" (「NA・GO・MI」, Peaceful)		1:17
13.	"Ending Theme [Heart of Sword ~ Yoake Mae]" (Ending Theme 「HEART OF SWORD ～夜明け前～」, Heart of Sword ~Before Dawn~)	T.M. Revolution	4:01
Total length:			46:19

== Rurouni Kenshin. The Original Soundtrack IV ==
Rurouni Kenshin -Meiji Kenkaku Romantan- The Original Soundtrack IV –Let It Burn- (るろうに剣心 -明治剣客浪漫譚- オリジナル・サウンドトラックIV —Let It Burn—) Released February 1, 1998.

No.	Title	Length
1.	"Welcome to my nightmare" (ウェルカム・トゥ・マイ・ナイトメア)	4:39
2.	"Curved air" (カーヴド・エア)	2:41
3.	"Dancing madly backwards" (ダンシング・マッドリー・バックワーズ)	3:13
4.	"Lunatic" (ルナティック)	4:30
5.	"Preacher" (プリーチャー)	3:18
6.	"Justice" (ジャスティス)	1:32
7.	"Let it burn" (レット・イット・バーン)	5:11
8.	"Shades of cloud" (シェイズ・オブ・クラウド)	2:27
9.	"Lightning" (ライトニング)	5:39
10.	"Typhoon" (タイフーン)	2:40
11.	"Let it rain" (レット・イット・レイン)	1:30
12.	"Little wing" (リトル・ウィング)	5:02
Total length:		41:54

== Rurouni Kenshin: Songs ==
Rurouni Kenshin -Meiji Kenkaku Romantan- Songs (るろうに剣心 -明治剣客浪漫譚- SONGS) was released on August 1, 1996.

No.	Title	Music	Length
1.	"Overture - Tsuioku - In The Past" (Remembrance ~In the Past~)		4:28
2.	"Kenshin Himura sings "Aisuru Hito Wo Mamoru Tame Ni"" (Kenshin Himura sings "In order to protect loved ones")	Suzukaze Mayo	4:28
3.	"Kamiya Kaoru sings "Suki Toka Ja Nakute"" (Kamiya Kaoru sings "It's not that I Love...")	Fujitani Miki	4:56
4.	"Sagara Sanosuki sings "Kokoro No Hadaka"" (Sagara Sanosuke sings "Naked Heart")	Ueda Yuji	4:02
5.	"Miyoji Yahiko sings "Sekai No Boku"" (Miyoji Yahiko sings "World of Me")	Tominaga Miina	4:29
6.	"Promenade - Over The Horizon"		3:06
7.	"Kenshin & Kaoru duet "Natsu No E"" (Kenshin & Kaoru duet "Picture of Summer")	Suzukaze Mayo & Fujitani Miki	4:40
8.	"Sanosuke & Megumi duet "2 Of A Kind!""	Ueda Yuji & Doi Mika	4:08
9.	"Ayame & Suzume duet "Shiroi Ichigo"" (Ayame & Suzume duet "White Strawberry")	Yuasa Kaori & Namiki Noriko	3:32
10.	"Rurouni Kenshin Voices sing "Kono Sekai No Katasumi De"" (At this small corner of the World)
11.	"~Epilogue [Zanshou ~Venus and Mars~]" (Epilogue [Last rays of the sun ~Venus and Mars~])
Total length:			45:13

== Rurouni Kenshin: Songs 2 ==
Rurouni Kenshin -Meiji Kenkaku Romantan- Songs 2 (るろうに剣心 –明治剣客浪漫譚– SONGS 2) was released on July 18, 1998.

No.	Title	Music	Length
1.	"Innocence"	Seta Soujirou (Hidaka Noriko)	4:31
2.	"Ice Blue Eyes"	Makimachi Misao (Sakurai Tomo)	4:00
3.	"Ippatsu Yarou!" (一発野郎!)	Sagara Sanosuke (Ueda Yuji)	3:25
4.	"Journey"	Seta Soujirou (Hidaka Noriko)	4:33
5.	"Innocence (Drum'n' Bass Mix)"	Seta Soujirou (Hidaka Noriko)	5:01
6.	"Kanashimi ni Tamesaretemo" (悲しみに試されても)	Amakusa Sayo	4:11
7.	"Sonomama" (そのまま)	Katsu Itsuko	4:02
8.	"The End of the Day"	Misanagi Moriya	5:10
9.	"Ashita no Kakera" (明日のかけら)	Takatsuki Gentatsu (Sasaki Nozomu)	5:18
10.	"Natsu no E ~'98 Summer Version~" (夏の絵, Picture of Summer)	Himura Kenshin (Mayo Suzukaze) & Kamiya Kaoru (Miki Fujitani)	4:54
