= Traveler (Hitomi album) =

Studio album by Hitomi
- Released: May 12, 2004
- Genre: J-pop, pop rock
- Label: Love Life

Hitomi chronology
HTM: Tiartrop Fles (2003)	Traveler (2004)	Love Concent (2006)

Singles from Traveler
- 1. "Hikari" Released: February 11, 2004; 2. "Kokoro no Tabibito/Speed Star" Released: April 28, 2004

Traveler is the seventh studio album of Japanese singer Hitomi. The album was formally released on May 12, 2004 by the Avex Trax label. This is the first album of Hitomi to be released in the CD+DVD format, which Avex first introduced to their artists in 2003.

== Background ==
All lyrics on the album were written by Hitomi, and it features production of Zentaro Watanabe, Takamune Negishi and CMJK. In the album Hitomi tries many different music genres, from bossa nova to electronica.

The album had two promotional singles. "Hikari", which was used as theme song of the TBS TV show Koisuru Honey Coming and from the double A-side single "Kokoro no Tabibito/Speed Star", the first one was used as theme song of the Fuji TV drama Rikon Bengoshi, and the last in TV commercials of Toshiba cellphones A5504T.

== Track listing ==
CD
No.	Title	Lyrics	Music	Arranger(s)	Length
1.	"Comodón Johnson"		José Luis Pardo	Zentarō Watanabe	2:34
2.	"Speed Star"	Hitomi, Triplane	Hitomi, Triplane	Takamune Negishi	4:43
3.	"Shiawasette, Nan desu ka? (シアワセッテ、ナンデスカ?)"	Hitomi	Hikari	CMJK	4:22
4.	"Anti (ア・ン・チ)"	Hitomi	Kunio Tago	Negishi	4:30
5.	"Hikari (ヒカリ)"	Hitomi	Hideyuki Obata	Negishi	4:33
6.	"Steady"	Hitomi	Naruya Ihashi	Watanabe	4:57
7.	"Kaze no Message (風の伝言)"	Masayoshi Yamazaki	Masayoshi Yamazaki	Watanabe	3:41
8.	"Like A Free Bird"	Hitomi	Haruo Takimoto	Negishi	4:56
9.	"Status (ステータス)"	Hitomi	Masato Kitano	Negishi	4:27
10.	"Kokoro no Tabibito (心の旅人)"	Hitomi	Masato Kitano	Watanabe	4:14
11.	"Moment"	Hitomi	Yuta Nakano	Negishi	5:25

DVD
No.	Title	Length
1.	"Kokoro no Tabibito (心の旅人)"
2.	"Speed Star"

== Charts and sales ==
Oricon sales charts (Japan)

Release	Chart	Peak position	Sales total	Chart run
May 12, 2004	Oricon Daily Albums Chart			
May 12, 2004	Oricon Weekly Albums Chart	2	83,000	8 weeks
May 12, 2004	Oricon Monthly Albums Chart			
May 12, 2004	Oricon Yearly Albums Chart			
