= Love Concent =

Studio album by Hitomi
- Released: September 27, 2006
- Recorded: 2004–2006
- Genre: J-pop
- Label: Love Life

Hitomi chronology
Traveler (2004)	Love Concent (2006)	Love Life 2 (2009)

Singles from Love Concent
- 1. "Japanese Girl" Released: June 11, 2005; 2. "Love Angel" Released: August 24, 2005; 3. "Cra"g"y Mama" Released: November 23, 2005; 4. "Go My Way" Released: May 10, 2006; 5. "Ai no Kotoba" Released: September 13, 2006

Love Concent is Hitomi's eighth studio album and eleventh album overall, released in 2006. This album is her first album since Traveler, which was released on May 12, 2004. This album features five singles — "Japanese Girl", "Love Angel", "Cra"g"y Mama", "Go My Way", and "Ai no Kotoba".

Hitomi wrote all lyrics on the album. In addition, she composed change yourself, Lost Emotion in Darkness and so you, making Love Concent the album on which Hitomi has exercised the most creative influence.

The album contains thirteen songs, seven of them being never-before-released. The DVD portion contains five PVs. First press edition of this album will add a 28-page photobook that was shot in Los Angeles as well as two additional video clips on the DVD.

== Track listing ==
CD
No.	Title	Lyrics	Music	Arranger(s)	Length
1.	"Loveholic"	Hitomi	Zentaro Watanabe	Watanabe	2:05
2.	"Arabian Dreaming (アラビアン・ドリーミング)"	Hitomi	Avant Grade	Avant Grade, Hiroshi Kim	3:42
3.	"Ai no Kotoba (アイ ノ コトバ)"	Hitomi	Mo-doo-	Watanabe	3:58
4.	"Change Yourself"	Hitomi	Hitomi	Watanabe	4:28
5.	"Ren'ai Hikō (恋愛飛行)"	Hitomi, Masato Kitano	Kitano	Watanabe	5:08
6.	"Love Angel"	Hitomi	Avant Grade	Watanabe	4:23
7.	"Go My Way"	Hitomi	Akimitsu Honma	Honma	4:19
8.	"Cra"g"y Mama"	Hitomi	Avant Grade	Watanabe	4:21
9.	"Day-O"	Hitomi	Watanabe	Watanabe	4:04
10.	"Lost Emotion In Darkness"	Hitomi	Hitomi	Watanabe	4:27
11.	"Japanese Girl"	Hitomi	Avant Grade	Watanabe	4:29
12.	"Love Concent"	Hitomi	Kim	Watanabe	4:07
13.	"So You"	Hitomi	Hitomi	Watanabe	4:27

DVD: Music videos
No.	Title	Length
1.	"Japanese Girl"	4:29
2.	"Go My Way"	4:19
3.	"Ai no Kotoba (アイ ノ コトバ)"	3:58
4.	"L.A. Making Shot"	12:49

== Charts and sales ==
=== Oricon sales charts (Japan) ===
Release date	Chart	Peak position	Sales total
27 September 2006	Oricon Daily Albums Chart	7	
27 September 2006	Oricon Weekly Albums Chart	13	15,393

=== Singles ===
Date	Title	Peak position	Sales
1 June 2005	Japanese Girl	18	25,200
24 August 2005	Love Angel	34	9,300
23 November 2005	"Cra"g"y Mama"	46	4,000
10 May 2006	Go My Way	22	12,000
13 September 2006	Ai no Kotoba	49	2,100
