= Japanese Girl =

Single by Hitomi

from the album Love Concent
- Released: June 1, 2005
- Recorded: 2005
- Genre: J-pop; dance-pop
- Label: Love Life Records
- Songwriter(s): Hitomi

Hitomi singles chronology
"Kokoro no Tabibito/Speed Star" (2004)	"Japanese Girl" (2005)	"Love Angel" (2005)

Alternative Covers
- Limited Edition cover

"Japanese Girl" is a song by Japanese singer Hitomi. It is her 28th single and is also her first work to be released from her own sub-label within Avex, Love Life Records.

== Overview ==
The single was released the same date as the DVD Hitomi 2005 10th Anniversary Live: Thank You and the photoshoot "Hitomi Love Life Style", and it was released approximately one year after her previous single. "Japanese Girl", apart from being her first single to be released from her sub-label Love Life Records, marks as well a change in style in Hitomi's music. From the "rockish" image from her previous works until that date, with this single Hitomi began trying more dance-pop oriented music, and also changed her image to be more provocative than before. "Japanese Girl" was used as the opening theme of NHK's TV show Music Fighter for May, and also of TVO's Heroin Tanjo!.

Its B-sides include "Venus", a cover of the Shocking Blue song which was used as backing music in commercials of Japan's Gillette starring Hitomi herself, and also a re-arranged version of "There Is...", Hitomi's 15th single.

The limited edition of the single included a special set of nail chip as a special collaboration of Hitomi with nail artist Eriko Kurosaki.

== Track listing ==
1. "Japanese Girl"
2. "Venus"
3. "There Is... (Love Life Version 2005)"

== Charts ==
Oricon Sales Chart (Japan)

Release	Chart	Peak position	Number of weeks	Sales total	Ref
June 1, 2005	Oricon Weekly Singles Chart	18	7	25,200	
