= Déjà-vu (Hitomi album) =

Studio album by hitomi
- Released: November 12, 1997
- Genre: J-pop
- Length: 61:58
- Label: avex trax

Hitomi chronology
By Myself (1996)	Déjà-vu (1997)	Thermo Plastic (1999)

Singles from Déjà-vu
- 1. "Busy Now" Released: April 9, 1997; 2. "Problem" Released: June 11, 1997; 3. "Pretty Eyes" Released: October 1, 1997

Déjà-vu is the third original album by Japanese singer Hitomi. Originally released on November 12, 1997, by avex trax, it reached #2 on the Oricon Top 200 and charted for 11 weeks.

== Track listing ==
CD
No.	Title	Lyrics	Music	Arranger(s)	Length
1.	"Mistake"	Hitomi	Tetsuya Komuro	Komuro	4:12
2.	"Busy Now"	Hitomi, Takahiro Maeda	Cozy Kubo	Kubo	5:14
3.	"Turning Point"	Hitomi	Kubo	Kubo	5:04
4.	"Slow Song"	Hitomi	Komuro	Komuro	5:41
5.	"Poker Face"	Hitomi	Komuro	Komuro	4:56
6.	"Free Soul!!"	Hitomi	Komuro, Kubo	Komuro	5:03
7.	"Hard Days Night (One More Beauty)"	Hitomi	Komuro	Komuro	4:28
8.	"Problem"	Hitomi	Komuro	Komuro	4:39
9.	"Digital Worker (Who's He?)"	Hitomi	Komuro	Komuro, Kubo	6:04
10.	"Pretty Eyes"	Hitomi	Komuro	Komuro, Kubo	5:36
11.	"Déjà-vu"	Hitomi	Komuro, Kubo	Komuro	4:12
