= By Myself (Hitomi album) =

Studio album by Hitomi
- Released: September 11, 1996
- Genre: J-pop
- Length: 48:49
- Label: Avex Trax

Hitomi chronology
Go to the Top (1995)	By Myself (1996)	Déjà-vu (1997)

Singles from By Myself
- 1. "Sexy" Released: February 28, 1996; 2. "In the Future" Released: May 22, 1996; 3. "By Myself" Released: August 7, 1996

By Myself (stylized as by myself) is the second studio album by Japanese singer Hitomi, released on August 7, 1996 via Avex Trax. The album was a commercial success reaching #7 in the Oricon weekly charts and remaining in the chart for 12 consecutive weeks. Total album sales exceeded 808,000 in Japan, making By Myself hitomi's most commercially successful album.

== Track listing ==
No.	Title	Lyrics	Music	Arranger(s)	Length
1.	"Sunshine Heaven, Moonlight Heaven"	Hitomi, Takahiro Maeda	Cozy Kubo	Kubo	5:51
2.	"Sexy"	Hitomi	Tetsuya Komuro	Komuro	5:41
3.	"Never Give Up!"	Hitomi	Kubo	Kubo	4:50
4.	"Raise My Eyes"	Hitomi, Maeda	Kubo	Kubo	5:39
5.	"In The Future"	Hitomi	Komuro	Komuro	5:00
6.	"Plain"	Hitomi	Kubo	Kubo	4:22
7.	"By Myself"	Hitomi	Komuro	Komuro	4:16
8.	"Real Love"	Hitomi, Maeda	Kubo	Kubo	4:41
9.	"Shinin' On"	Hitomi	Komuro	Komuro	4:13
10.	"Forever"	Hitomi	Kubo	Kubo	4:08
