= Love Life 2 =

Studio album by Hitomi
- Released: June 24, 2009
- Recorded: 2008–2009
- Genres: Pop, pop rock, synthpop
- Labels: Love Life Records (Subsidiary of Avex Trax)

Hitomi chronology
Love Concent (2006)	Love Life 2 (2009)	Spirit (2011)

Alternative Covers
- CD+DVD Cover

Singles from Love Life 2
- 1. "Fight for Your Run☆" Released: August 20, 2008; 2. "World! Wide! Love!" Released: May 20, 2009

Love Life 2 is the ninth studio album by Japanese singer-songwriter Hitomi, released on June 24, 2009, by Hitomi's sub-label of Avex Trax, Love Life Records. It was originally to be released June 10, 2009, but was pushed back for promotional reasons. The first pressing of the album came with an external bonus, a poster. An accompanying photobook of the same name, that shows the singer completely nude, was released on the same day.

== Album history ==
On July 11, 2008, Hitomi revealed on her blog that she remarried, on June 30, 2008, and was pregnant. She also announced this during the a-nation concert in Ajinomoto Stadium on August 30, 2008. Earlier that August, Hitomi released a new digital single called "Fight for Your Run☆". A limited edition was released on August 20, 2008, and the other edition was released on August 27, 2008. Hitomi gave birth to a baby girl on December 23, 2008. It is during this time, and possibly some time before, that the concept and planning for "Love Life 2" began. The album covers, promotional shots, and some of the music videos are also thought to have been done during this time. The album was officially announced as "Love Life 2" on Hitomi's website on May 22, 2009, two days after the release of her 34th single, "World! Wide! Love!".

== Track listing ==
CD
No.	Title	Lyrics	Music	Arranger(s)	Length
1.	"Just You"	Hitomi	Joakim Björklund, Miriam Nervo, Olivia Nervo	Hiroki (Toei Academy)	3:35
2.	"World! Wide! Love! (Chikyū ni Umarete Yokatta Ver. (チキュウニウマレテヨカッタ Ver.)"	Hitomi	Hiroyuki Fujino	Fujino, Hiroki	4:19
3.	"Sagashi Tsuduketeta Mono (探し続けてたもの)"	Yusuke Osada	Yusuke Osada	Sosuke Watanabe, Hiroki	4:27
4.	"Eternal Sunshine (エターナル☆サンシャイン)"	Hitomi	Fujino	Fujino, Hiroki	3:05
5.	"Tabidachi ni Fuku Kaze (旅立ちに吹く風)"	Juki Jureta, Hitomi	Junjiro Seki	Seki, Hiroki	3:36
6.	"Memory" (Japanese cover of the Sugarcult song of the same name)	Tim Pagnotta	Pagnotta	Zentaro Watanabe	3:48
7.	"Fight for Your Run"	Hitomi	Joakim Björklund, Miriam Nervo, Olivia Nervo	Hiroki	3:27
8.	"Hello-Good Bye!"	Jez Ashurst, Richie Wermerling, Hitomi	Ashurst, Wermerling, Hitomi	Ashurst	3:11
9.	"Beat"	Gajin, Hitomi	Gajin	Gajin, Hiroki	5:03
10.	"Kokoro no Sōgen (ココロの草原)"	Hitomi	Fujino	Fujino, Hiroki, Yoichi Murata (brass instrument arrangement)	3:33
11.	"Vision: Don't Stop the Earth"	Hitomi	Cell No. 9	Cell No. 9	4:56

DVD: Limited Edition
No.	Title	Length
1.	"World! Wide! Love!" (Music video)
2.	"Sagashi Tsuduketeta Mono (探し続けてたもの)" (Music video)
3.	"Totsukitouka (トツキトウカ, Ten-month ten days)" (Hitomi Interview)

== Charts ==
Oricon Sales Chart (Japan)

Release	Chart	Peak position	Sales total	Chart run
June 24, 2009	Oricon Daily Albums Chart	13		
June 24, 2009	Oricon Weekly Albums Chart	27	5,482	1 week
