= Love Life (Hitomi album) =

Studio album by Hitomi
- Released: December 13, 2000
- Genre: J-pop
- Length: 61:58
- Label: avex trax
- Producers: Hitomi, Tetsuya Morimoto, Takeshi Hara, Hiroyuki Shiotsuki, Naoki Yamada, Tohru Oka, Motohisa Shiraishi

Hitomi chronology
Thermo Plastic (1999)	Love Life (2000)	Huma-rhythm (2002)

Singles from Love Life
- 1. "Love 2000" Released: June 28, 2000; 2. "Maria" Released: September 20, 2000; 3. "Kimi ni Kiss" Released: November 8, 2000

Love Life is the fifth studio album by Japanese singer hitomi, released on December 13, 2000, by avex trax.

== Description ==
Following the 1999 amicable split with her previous producer Tetsuya Komuro, hitomi was able to take more creative control of her album production. This is evidenced on Love Life by the large collaborative efforts of hitomi with her recording engineers Tetsuya Morimoto, Takeshi Hara, Hiroyuki Shiotsuki, Naoki Yamada, Tohru Oka, and Motohisa Shiraishi.

Love Life was a strong commercially successful album selling over 766,000 copies in Japan and reaching #2 on the Oricon weekly charts while remaining on the charts for 12 weeks. The singles "Love 2000", "Maria" and "キミにKiss (Kimi ni Kiss)" were all successes within Japan hitting in the top 20 of Oricon singles chart.

The cover of the album showing hitomi undressed with long hair covering her chest caused something of a controversy by its similarity to the Loveppears album of the singer Ayumi Hamasaki, released a year before. This is the album that later gave the name to the production sub label Love Life Record created by hitomi in 2005.

== Track listing ==
CD
No.	Title	Lyrics	Music	Arranger(s)	Length
1.	"It's Only Access"	Hitomi	Shintaro Hagiwara	Masato Kamata	5:00
2.	"Love 2000"	Hitomi	Masato Kamata	Zentaro Watanabe	4:23
3.	"Maria" (album mix)	Hitomi, Kunio Tago	Tago	Watanabe	5:17
4.	"Paradise"	Hitomi	Watanabe	Watanabe	4:54
5.	"Regret"	Hitomi	Watanabe	Watanabe	4:30
6.	"Love Me Darling"	Hitomi	Watanabe	Tago	4:05
7.	"Fat Free"	Hitomi	Watanabe	Tago	4:07
8.	"Kitsuku Aishite yo (キツク愛してよ)"	Hitomi	Watanabe	Tago	4:59
9.	"Over The World"	Hitomi	Watanabe	Tago	4:32
10.	"Pray"	Hitomi	Watanabe	Tago	4:38
11.	"Kimi ni Kiss (キミにKISS)"	Hitomi	Watanabe	Tago	4:37
12.	"Love Life"	Hitomi	Tago	Tatsumi Moritoki	5:38
13.	"Kodoku na Sora (孤独な空)"	Hitomi	Tago	Moritoki	4:14
