= Huma-rhythm =

Studio album by Hitomi
- Released: January 30, 2002
- Genre: J-pop
- Length: 65:58
- Label: avex trax

Hitomi chronology
| Love Life (2000) | Huma-rhythm (2002) | Self Portrait (2002) |

Singles from Huma-rhythm
- 1. "Inner Child" Released: April 18, 2001; 2. "Is it You?" Released: August 22, 2001; 3. "I Am" and "Innocence" Released: October 24, 2001; 4. "Samurai Drive" Released: January 9, 2002

Huma-rhythm is the sixth studio album by Japanese singer Hitomi. It was released on January 30, 2002, through Avex Trax. Following the highly successful Love Life (2000), Hitomi began to notice a "disconnection" between her perception as a public figure and her true self in private. She sought to pursue the core of her being; articulating "our dissatisfaction with society" yet wanting to "live happily as [herself]".

Huma-rhythm is lyrically centered on themes of love and individuality, and Hitomi challenged herself to expand her vocal expression during its recording. Longtime collaborator Zentaro Watanabe returned as the album's predominant arranger, programmer and instrumentalist, while a much more varied cast of composers contributed to Huma-rhythm compared to her previous releases. The album features contributions from indie rock band Cune and Dai Nagano from Do As Infinity.

The album was preceded by four singles: "Inner Child", "Is it You?", "I Am/Innocence" and "Samurai Drive", with the latter three reaching the top ten of the Oricon chart. "Samurai Drive", promoted as Huma-rhythm's lead single, became Hitomi's highest-peaking entry at number three and is considered to be one of her signature songs. She later performed it at the 52nd Kōhaku Uta Gassen. At the 43rd Japan Record Awards, Hitomi received an Excellent Work accolade for "Is it You?".

Huma-rhythm was a commercial success, peaking at the top of the Oricon charts and charting for eight consecutive weeks, selling over 521,000 copies in total. The album was supported by the nationwide Hitomi Live Tour 2002 Huma-Rhythm, which visited twenty-one cities and closed out at the Nippon Budokan. At the time of the album's release, Hitomi viewed it as a "culminative work" which would allow her to pursue "different possibilities", a sentiment she would repeat in developing her second greatest hits album Self Portrait released later that year.

== Background and development ==
In June 2000, Hitomi released the single "Love 2000", which became widely successful after marathon runner Naoko Takahashi stated that the song helped to raise her tenshōn (テンション) or "excitement" before races, leading to a gold medal at the 2000 Summer Olympics. The single became Hitomi's longest-charting entry at twenty-six weeks, and its parent album Love Life (2000) sold over 766,000 copies at the end of 2001. The success of "Love 2000" prompted her first performance at the 51st Kōhaku Uta Gassen.

Despite this newfound popularity, a sense of dissatisfaction began to pervade her thoughts. Hitomi developed her follow up from the notion that, "the wave of my 2000 self came crashing against the wall of my existence". In a February 2002 interview with Beat Freak magazine, she explains:

"In the past year or two, I’ve been feeling a rift between the public’s perception of me and the real Hitomi that I wanted to express. I have a weirdly accommodating side and just kept releasing music even while doubting myself. But since I think, the beginning of [2001], I started to feel that if I continued down this road I would lose my real self. And so I started to seriously ponder my roots."

While Hitomi stated that she always tried to write lyrics as truthfully as she could, she noted a growing desire to "pursue the core of [her] being" and set the word "humanity" as her personal theme during the album's development. The title Huma-rhythm itself is coined from "human", meant to express individuality, and "rhythm" to represent joy and freedom. The title further articulates her view that "[one] should be able to live happier with these [concepts]", which retailer HMV further notes as "symbolizing her position in living according to her roots." Hitomi listened to Strawberry Flower, Fantastic Plastic Machine, A Tribe Called Quest, and Bran Van 3000 during its recording, though she affirmed that none of these artists influenced Huma-rhythm directly.

"Innocence" was recorded as an image song (イメージソング) for the Fuji TV coverage of the 28th Berlin Marathon, which Takahashi was a participant of, and it is said that the department's producer asked Hitomi personally. When asked by Yuko Ayakawa of Groovin' how she felt "[being] supported by so many woman of [her] own age," and if she's aware of it when creating music, Hitomi stated: "Very happy... I can’t say I don’t [think of it] at all. I am a woman too."

== Recording and composition ==
The album was recorded over the period of a year, in which several "large impact" singles were released, influencing her decision to balance Huma-rhythm with a selection of "relaxed" songs. Hitomi stated that she fixated less on sounding "rock" and leaned towards "a rather programming-style" in regards to its arrangement. As she approached her vocals with the idea of giving each track "a different atmosphere", she found difficulty in "making the switch emotionally between songs".

"We got more frustrated with society and things become much more inconvenient for us as we become adults, but even in it, I'm gonna enjoy performing myself as what I am at this time."

— Hitomi speaking to Beat Freak, February 2002

The album opens with the intro "Cosmic World", which Hitomi intended to evoke the image of "Space equals air, Earth equals myself and living creatures." It then delves into "Ele Pop", CD Journal commenting: "A flashy and cute up-tempo pop number whose arrangement combines retro video game-like electronic and disco sounds." Hitomi states, "I took each shredded phrase and connected them into one piece."

== Release ==
The album was announced on December 21, 2001; a press release through Tower Records detailed a first press limited edition sold exclusively through their stores with a special cover. A short preview of Hitomi's next single "Understanding" is affixed as a hidden track to the end of "Little More" (リトルモア) on these editions, which was subsequently released in full two weeks after the album.

Its material re-appears on Hitomi's greatest hits album Self Portrait (2002), with four singles and an album track. The compilation charted at number one and Self Portrait was awarded Rock & Pop Album of the Year at the 16th Japan Gold Disc Awards.

=== Singles ===
"Inner Child" was released as the album's first single on April 18, 2001, nearly five months after Love Life (2000). It underperformed compared to Hitomi's previous singles; peaking at number sixteen and charting for five weeks, selling 51,000 copies in total. The music video features Hitomi performing in a balloon-enclosed space with foreign models working the microphone equipment; the balloons eventually lift to reveal Hitomi standing on a beach. "Inner Child" appeared in commercials for the Gunze brand Body Wild a month in advance, which became a topic as Hitomi was featured donning men's underwear.

"Is it You?" was released on August 22, 2001, the same day as her Live Tour 2001 Love Life DVD. Despite this, "Is it You?" was a substantial improvement over its predecessor, peaking at number four and becoming Huma-rhythm's longest-charting and highest-selling single at nine weeks with 191,000 copies in total. Its music video features Hitomi in an ushanka traversing across a moonscape as she searches for a series of keys: one attached to a cherry blossom tree and one in a pool of water; she unlocks a room to free a caged bird before walking into the light herself. "Is it You?" was the theme song to the Fuji TV drama Shotgun Marriage, which began airing on July 2, 2001. Furthermore, the single's B-sides "Open Mind" and "Why?" re-appear on Huma-rhythm.

"I Am" and "Innocence" were issued as a double A-side single on October 24, 2001. The release charted at number seven, spending six weeks on the Oricon with 96,000 copies sold. Hitomi is photographed with a baby monkey on her shoulder for its cover. "Innocence" received a video treatment which features an all-black clad Hitomi singing in an atrium, intercut with all-white scenes of her and a chimpanzee in a spacesuit. "I Am" was the opening theme to the latter half of Inuyasha's second season, appearing from episode 35 on July 16, 2001. "Innocence" was the image song for the Fuji TV coverage of the 28th Berlin Marathon, which aired on September 30, 2001.

"Samurai Drive" was released on January 9, 2002, a month ahead of Huma-rhythm. It was promoted as the album's lead single, and became Hitomi's highest-peaking entry on the Oricon Weekly Singles chart ever at number three. Though spending only seven weeks on the chart and selling 146,000 copies, less than "Is it You?", "Samurai Drive" nonetheless became known as one of Hitomi's signature songs. A reviewer for CD Journal commented: "The title is samurai but the music and lyrics don’t sound Japanese?! [...] The CD jacket with the crazed maiko wearing a punkish kimono has quite the impact."

=== Promotion and tour ===
Hitomi covered fifteen magazines from December 2001 to February 2002, including Popteen, Seventeen and An An. She held impromptu performances described as a "secret fashion show live circuit" around Shibuya, Harajuku, and Aoyama on January 15, 2002, where she performed in front of 30,000 people in total.

From the weekend of February 2 to 3, 2001, Tower Records partnered with Hitomi to erect a large display in front of its nine-story Shibuya building. The design mimicked the covers of "Samurai Drive" and Huma-rhythm, featuring its "planet key point".

Tickets for the Hitomi Live Tour 2002 Huma-Rhythm were made available on March 9, 2002. Hitomi embarked on its first date at the Ichiharashi City Hall (市原市市民会館, Ichihara-shi Shimin Kaikan) on April 28, 2002, and continued with two dates each in Nagoya and Osaka. For a total of twenty-three performances, its final stop visited the Nippon Budokan on June 14, 2002, which was filmed. Its DVD release coincided with her Self Portrait compilation on September 4, 2002, which features a live recording of then-unreleased single "Flow" from the tour. The tour was subsequently broadcast on Wowow on October 9, 2002.

== Critical performance ==
The album received positive remarks from critics at the time of its release. A writer for CD Journal noted, "She has a strong reputation not just as a singer but a female icon of the times. Ignoring the views of those around her, she decided to express her inner, personal struggles with her sixth album. The lively atmosphere here displays her humanity. The high quality is an accomplishment."

HMV opined, "Her sixth album has arrived with its feet firmly planted in the ground. It’s introspective and very much Hitomi throughout the fourteen tracks that create her world. It's a next level masterpiece. [...] She knows exactly what she wants to sing about, sounds she wants to make, and the collaboration with Watanabe Zentaro creates a world overflowing with blinding innocence. With this album she amply displays she not only is an opinion leader but has the ability to strongly lead the scene in Japan."

== Chart performance ==
Huma-rhythm debuted at number one on the Oricon Albums Chart, with an estimated 278,260 sold units in its first week of sales. It slipped to number four the following week, shifting 110,230 in Japan. The album stayed in the top ten one last week, ranking at number nine and selling 60,260 copies. It then slid to number twelve, selling 29,280 units, before dropping to number 20 on its sixth charting week and out of the top twenty entirely the following week. Huma-rhythm peaked at number two on the Japan Top Albums chart according to the February 16, 2002, edition of Billboard magazine.

Huma-rhythm lasted eight weeks in the top 300 chart, and was certified platinum in January 2002 by the Recording Industry Association of Japan (RIAJ) for shipments of over 500,000 units. At the end of 2002 Huma-rhythm sold 520,940 units in Japan, making it the 28th best-selling album of the year.

== Charts ==
| === Weekly chart === : Chart (2002) / Peak position; Japanese Albums (Oricon) / 1; === Monthly charts === : Chart (2002) / Peak position; Japanese Albums (Oricon) / 1 | === Yearly chart === : Chart (2002) / Position; Japanese Albums (Oricon) / 28 |

== Track listing ==
CD
| No. | Title | Lyrics | Music | Arranger(s) | Length |
|---|---|---|---|---|---|
| 1. | "Cosmic World" (Intro) | Hitomi | Zentaro Watanabe | Watanabe | 1:30 |
| 2. | "Ele Pop" | Hitomi, Tetsuhiko Suzuki | expo | Watanabe | 4:26 |
| 3. | "Samurai Drive" | Hitomi, Ryozo Kobayashi | Cune | Watanabe | 4:19 |
| 4. | "Is It You?" | Hitomi | Kousuke Morimoto | Watanabe | 4:50 |
| 5. | "Primary" | Hitomi | Dai Nagao | tasuku | 4:31 |
| 6. | "Hi Hi Hi" | Hitomi | Watanabe | Watanabe | 4:21 |
| 7. | "Open Mind" | Hitomi | Shintaro Hagiwara | Watanabe | 5:24 |
| 8. | "I am" | Hitomi | Masato Kitano | Watanabe | 4:45 |
| 9. | "Plastic Time Machine (プラスティック タイムマシーン)" | Hitomi | Cune | Watanabe | 4:48 |
| 10. | "Why?" | Hitomi | Kitano | Watanabe | 5:19 |
| 11. | "Hateshinai Kanashimi (果てしない悲しみ)" | Hitomi | Akimitsu Honma | Honma | 4:51 |
| 12. | "Inner Child" | Hitomi | Akinori Suzuki | Watanabe | 4:57 |
| 13. | "Innocence" | Hitomi | Kitano | Watanabe | 5:27 |
| 14. | "Little More (リトルモア)" | Hitomi | expo | Watanabe | 5:24 |

Bonus tracks
| No. | Title | Lyrics | Music | Arranger(s) | Length |
|---|---|---|---|---|---|
| 15. | "Understanding" (short version) | Hitomi | Kousuke Morimoto | Keiji Matsui | 1:04 |
