= Thermo Plastic =

Studio album by Hitomi
- Released: October 13, 1999
- Genre: J-pop
- Length: 70:53
- Label: avex trax

Hitomi chronology
déjà-vu (1997)	Thermo Plastic (1999)	Love Life (2000)

Singles from Thermo Plastic
- 1. "Kimi no Tonari/Wish" Released: June 16, 1999; 2. "There Is..." Released: August 4, 1999; 3. "Taion" Released: October 6, 1999

thermo plastic is the 4th album by the Japanese singer Hitomi, released on the Avex Trax label on the 13th of October, 1999.

The tracks "Wish", "Kimi no Tonari", "Taion" and "There is..." were released as singles. The album reached #2 on the weekly Oricon charts and charted for nine weeks, selling 316,250 copies. It's the 75th best-selling album of the year 1999 in Japan.

It is her first album that is not produced by Tetsuya Komuro.

== Track listing ==
CD
No.	Title	Lyrics	Music	Arranger(s)	Length
1.	"L'utero"	Hitomi	Zentaro Watanabe	Zentaro Watanabe	2:12
2.	"Gamble"	Hitomi	Dai Nagao	Watanabe	4:47
3.	"Kimi no Tonari (君のとなり)"	Hitomi	Hitomi	Ryo Yoshimata	4:07
4.	"Bird"	Hitomi	Watanabe	Watanabe	3:53
5.	"Wish"	Hitomi	Nagao	Watanabe	4:42
6.	"Amai Namida (甘い涙)"	Hitomi, Kayoko Shinchi	Nagao	Hitomi, Kazutoshi Takebayashi	4:54
7.	"Re-make"	Hitomi	Watanabe	Watanabe	4:21
8.	"Made To Be In Love"	Hitomi	Nagao, Hitomi	Watanabe	4:54
9.	"A Little (I Need Everything)"	Hitomi	Tatsumi Moritoki	Moritoki	5:21
10.	"There Is..."	Hitomi	Nagao	Watanabe	4:47
11.	"Under The Sun"	Hitomi	Nagao	Watanabe	5:04
12.	"Taion (体温)"	Hitomi	Watanabe	Watanabe	4:47

First pressing Bonus track
No.	Title	Lyrics	Music	Arranger(s)	Length
13.	"Kimi no Tonari (君のとなり)" (acoustic version)	Hitomi	Hitomi	Ryo Yoshimata	3:47
