= Go to the Top (album) =

Studio album by Hitomi
- Released: September 27, 1995
- Recorded: 1993–1995
- Genre: Pop; dance-pop; pop rock
- Length: 51:45 (CD)
- Label: Avex Trax
- Producer: Tetsuya Komuro; Cozy Kubo; Get Off; No! Galers

Hitomi chronology
Go to the Top (1995)	By Myself (1996)

Singles from Go to the Top
- 1. "Let's Play Winter" Released: November 21, 1994; 2. "We Are "Lonely Girl"" Released: February 22, 1995; 3. "Candy Girl" Released: April 21, 1995; 4. "Go to the Top" Released: July 26, 1995

Go to the Top is the debut album by Japanese singer-songwriter Hitomi, released on September 27, 1995, by Avex Trax. The first press edition of the album came with the CD case housed inside a hardback case, similar to a book. The inside of the back of the case contains a mini-photobook. The RIAJ has certified it 2× platinum, recognizing over 500,000+ shipments throughout Japan. On the Oricon charts, the album's peak position was #3, and it stayed on the charts for eight weeks.

== History ==
Hitomi had previously released two singles without much success. Her debut single, "Let's Play Winter" failed to chart on Japan's Oricon chart, and her follow-up single, "We Are "Lonely Girl"", while charting much better at #61 on the charts, failed to make a big impression with sales.

It was not until the quiet release of her third single "Candy Girl" that suddenly Hitomi found success. "Candy Girl" charted much higher than her previous attempts, becoming her first single to chart in the Oricon top 20. This was most likely because "Candy Girl" had been aggressively marketed and appeared in a famous Japanese Kodak commercial. The single established the then 19-year-old Hitomi Furuya into a household name, showcasing her provocative image.

Following the sudden success of her third single, Hitomi and her label (fledgling at the time) Avex Trax quickly released another single, "Go to the Top" which also charted in the top 20, ensuring Hitomi's success for the time being. Go to the Top, Hitomi's debut studio album of the same name, was released two months later and rose in the charts, peaking at #3.

== Track listing ==
All lyrics are written by Hitomi

No.	Title	Music	Arranger(s)	Length
1.	"Go to the Top"	Tetsuya Komuro	Komuro, Cozy Kubo	4:34
2.	"Pleasure"	Komuro	Komuro, Kubo	6:47
3.	"You Dirty Bastard"	Get Off	Get Off	3:55
4.	"Tokyo nodo Man'naka Bus no Naka de (Tokyoのど真んなかBUSの中で)"	Komuro, Kubo	No! Galers	5:09
5.	"We Are "Lonely Girl""	Komuro	Kubo	5:09
6.	"Never Forget the Days"	Kubo	Kubo	5:26
7.	"Candy Girl"	Komuro	Komuro, Kubo	6:04
8.	"Fact"	Kubo	Kubo	4:42
9.	"Let's Play Winter"	Komuro	Komuro, Kubo	5:06
10.	"Maybe Failing Now..."	Kubo	Kubo	4:45

== Personnel ==
- Hitomi - lead vocals, lyrics
- Satoshi Miyashita - bass, chorus
- Mami Ishizuka - chorus
- Akihiko Shimizu - vocal direction
- Shuichi Nakano - drums, percussion, chorus
- Kazuhiro Matsuo, Ken Kimura - guitar, chorus
- Akio Kondo - keyboards
- Doug Sax - mastering
- Kevin Moloney - mixing
- Akihisa Murakami - programming
- Cozy Kubo, Tetsuya Komuro - electronic programming

=== Production ===
- Produced by hitomi, Tetsuya Komuro for Avex Trax
- Co-produced by Cozy Kubo
- Executive Production by Max Matsuura
- Engineered by Eiji Ohta, Katsuhiro Odashima, Masataka Ito, Shinpachiro Kawabe, Yoshinori Mizuide, Yuki Mitome
- Recorded by Naoki Nemoto, Shigeru Matsumura, Toshiaki Sabase, Toshihiro Wako

== Charts ==
Oricon Sales Chart (Japan)

Release	Chart	Peak position	Sales total	Chart run
September 27, 1995	Oricon Daily Albums Chart	1		
September 27, 1995	Oricon Weekly Albums Chart	3	406,000	8 weeks
September 27, 1995	Oricon Monthly Albums Chart	4		
September 27, 1995	Oricon Yearly Albums Chart	-		
