= Hitomi (singer) =

Japanese singer (born 1976)

- ヒトミ
- Born: Hitomi Furuya (古谷 仁美); January 26, 1976 (age 50); Tochigi, Japan
- Occupation: Singer
- Years active: 1992–present
- Height: 1.67 m (5 ft 6 in)
- Spouses: Keisuke Uesugi (m. 2002; div. 2007) Masayoshi Haneda (m. 2008; div. 2011) Unknown (m. 2014)
- Children: 4
- Musical career
- Genres: Pop; rock; electronica
- Instrument: Vocals
- Labels: Avex Trax; Love Life Records; Maximum 10
- Website: hitomilovelife.net

Hitomi Furuya (古谷 仁美, Furuya Hitomi; born January 26, 1976), known professionally as Hitomi (ヒトミ; stylized as hitomi), is a Japanese singer. She began her career as teen model before making her singing debuting under the helm of Tetsuya Komuro in 1994, who produced Hitomi's earliest work in pop music. Hitomi has striven for artistry over the course of her career, penning "forward-looking" lyrics and becoming known for her "unusual" fashion sense that accompanied a "supermodel allure". Her signature songs include "Candy Girl", "Love 2000" and "Samurai Drive".

Hitomi's career enjoyed success from Komuro's direction, including his work on her chart-topping second album By Myself (1996), however, her desire for more artistic input led to their amicable split by 1998. She started working with other musicians and composers, and branched out into musical genres such as pop rock as evident on her fifth album Love Life (2000), a turning point which sustained her position in the industry. Hitomi began incorporating electropop styles with her subsequent moves to Love Life Records in 2005 and independent label Maximum 10 in 2011.

Hitomi has amassed four number one albums throughout her career, including H (1999), Huma-rhythm (2002) and Self Portrait (2002), and has sold over 8.5 million records in Japan alone. She has earned two Japan Record Awards for Excellent Work and a Japan Gold Disc accolade for Rock & Pop Album of the Year, and has performed at the prestigious Kōhaku Uta Gassen program twice.

== Biography ==
=== Early life ===
Born Hitomi Furuya (古谷 仁美, Furuya Hitomi) in Tochigi, Japan, her family relocated to Kawasaki, Kanagawa Prefecture when she was a child. Consequently, she always identified herself as a girl from Kanagawa. Hitomi was an enthusiastic athlete throughout her childhood, playing baseball, soccer, and basketball, as well as an avid reader of manga. At age 16, she was spotted and approached by a scout from a modeling agency. She signed a short modeling contract and began appearing in magazines while she was still in high school.

In 1993, then 17 years old, Furuya was spotted by eminent Avex music producer Tetsuya Komuro at an audition. Komuro signed her to Avex, put her through vocal training, and decided that she should use an all-lowercase 'hitomi' as her stage name. The following year, in November 1994, she released her debut single, "Let's Play Winter", through Avex Trax, to which she wrote the lyrics. Since then, Hitomi has been the lyricist for almost all of her songs.

=== Debut and success ===
While her first two singles, "Let's Play Winter" and "We Are "Lonely Girl"" were considerable failures, her third single "Candy Girl" was used as the theme for a Kodak CM, and secured a top 10 spot on the Japanese Oricon music chart. Subsequent singles "By Myself" and "Busy Now" established Hitomi as one to watch in Japanese entertainment. Her second album By Myself, released in 1996, became her first musical work to debut at number one on the Oricon charts; it sold more than 800,000 copies.

After three studio albums and twelve singles, Komuro and Hitomi went their separate ways in 1998, and in 1999 she released her first greatest hits album, entitled H, that peaked at number one on the Japanese charts and sold more than a 500 thousand copies.

In 1999, her single "Kimi no Tonari" was used as the ending theme song for the PlayStation role-playing game Persona 2: Tsumi by Atlus.

In 2000, Hitomi gained much public attention after her single "Love 2000" was used as the image song of runner Naoko Takahashi, who became popular in Japan after winning the gold medal in the 2000 Summer Olympics. This helped the song to get a lot of airplay, and become a commercial success. She performed the song at the annual Kōhaku Uta Gassen. Her Love Life album released around that same time also caught attention within the Japanese entertainment industry because of its cover, on which she appeared naked covering her breasts with her arms.

In 2001, her song "I Am" was used as the second opening for the TV anime series InuYasha.

=== 2004–2009 ===
After a one-year and a half hiatus, in May 2004 Hitomi released a new studio album, Traveler. The concert tour she subsequently embarked upon was a huge success, and she played to packed arenas at almost every stop. As the 10th anniversary of her debut came in 2005, she opened her own record label, Love Life Records, which functioned as a subdivision of Avex. The first single to be released from the label was "Japanese Girl", her 28th single, which also marked a change in her style and looks, one that was much more modern dance-oriented and sexy, than any of her previous works.

In 2007, Hitomi obtained her first lead role in the movie Akumu Tantei, and also participated in her first musical: Waiting For The Sun: Tenkimachi. On December 5, 2007 her singles compilation album Peace was released to celebrate her 13th anniversary. She released a new digital single called "Fight for Your Run☆" in August 2008.

After a year on hiatus, she released a new single, "World! Wide! Love!", on May 20, 2009, and a month later she released her ninth studio album, Love Life 2. This album was a spiritual successor to her 2000 album Love Life, with Hitomi once again nude on the cover of it, but this time pregnant with her child.

=== 2011–2017: Departure from Avex Trax ===
Hitomi's last single in the Avex label, "Umarete Kurete Arigato/Smile World", was released on February 16, 2011. This month she also inaugurated her own baby clothing brand called PomiPomi. On March 28, 2011 it was announced that two new songs, "Special" and "Guru Maze Yeah!" would be used in the NHK educative cartoon Hana Kappa, as opening and ending themes respectively.

On April 5, 2011, it was announced that Hitomi had left the Avex major label and had signed to Maximum 10, an independent label affiliated with the Avex company. On April 27, her tenth studio album and first indie album, Spirit, was released, it featured mainly productions of western artists such as Rivers Cuomo, Chuck Comeau, Pierre Bouvier and Gabe Saporta. In June, Hitomi started her first live tour in five years, titled Live Tour 2011: Spirit.

Despite leaving the Avex label, Hitomi still participated as a featured artist in the tenth anniversary version of their A-Nation. She was part of the line-up of the concerts held in Aichi, Osaka, and Tokio. Her performance was later included in the DVD of A-Nation released in late 2011. In August 2011, Japanese model and occasional singer Mini made a remake of Hitomi's hit single "Candy Girl", which was released as a digital single in September. On November 30, 2011, Hitomi released a new mini album entitled Special, in which her songs featured in the NHK educational program Hana Kappa were included. This became her last release published by Avex.

Hitomi also collaborated with Sfpr, fellow label mates from Maximum 10, in the song "Feeder", which was included in their debut album released on January 1, 2012. On October 10, 2012, she released her eleventh album Möbius (stylized as ∞). The album had no commercial singles like her previous work, although the Brian Lee-produced song "Up Down" was promoted through a music video via YouTube. In November 2013, it was announced that Hitomi would be performing the theme song for the movie Kamen Rider × Kamen Rider Gaim & Wizard: The Fateful Sengoku Movie Battle. The song, entitled "Teppen Star", was released as her 35th single on December 18, 2013.

On March 18, 2014, Hitomi released a digital single entitled "Bara Yume". The song featured girl-group MAX on backing vocals, and was meant to be an answer song to her 1995 single "Candy Girl", as part of the celebration of her 20th anniversary in the music industry. She also performed for the first season of the 2014–2015 slice-of-life anime GO-GO Tamagotchi!. She performed a cover of the anime's opening theme and new song entitled "Rainbow", which serves as its ending theme. The 10th episode of GO-GO Tamagotchi! features a Tamagotchi character themed off her, named "Hitomitchi".

In October 2015, it was announced that Hitomi would participate in a tribute album to globe, for which she recorded a cover of their 1997 single "Anytime Smokin' Cigarette". The album, entitled #Globe 20th -Special Cover Best-, was released on December 16, 2015.

In 2017, Hitomi was appointed to sing the new theme song of NHK's Minna no Uta. The song was entitled "Yume Hakonda Randoseru" and was released as a digital single on February 2, 2017. In November 2017, she also started a new radio program called Hitomi Radio on Inter FM.

=== 2025–present: 30th anniversary and return to music ===
In 2025, Hitomi celebrated her 30th anniversary in the music industry with a special acoustic concert held on August 23 at the intimate venue Blues Alley Japan in Meguro, Tokyo. During the concert, she reflected warmly on her music career and expressed gratitude to her longtime fans, declaring "It does not really feel like I have 'done 30 years' […] It is not that intense drive I had when I was younger, but still—I truly believe this is where everything starts again. So I would be so happy if everyone could start this new chapter together with me," after which she also announced a free online live concert to be held in November 3 of the same year.

On November 3, 2025—designated as "Hitomi Day" (written as 1103, which in Japanese it phonetically resembles her name)— Hitomi marked her 30th debut anniversary with the free online live event Hitomi 30th Anniversary Online Live "Re:Connect", streamed on Avex's official YouTube channel. The pre-recorded performance, featuring a six-piece band in a Tokyo studio, included Hitomi herself joining the live chat for real-time interaction with fans. A highlight of the concert was a special collaboration where fellow artists Kaori Mochida and Tomiko Van—contemporaries who rose to prominence in the same era—personally rewrote the lyrics to two of Hitomi's past songs: Mochida handled "Taion", while Van reworked "There is…", with the updated versions receiving their world premieres during the show. The concert was subsequently released in December 2025 as Hitomi's first live album, entitled Re:Connect, exclusively on digital platforms.

On January 14, 2026, Hitomi released a new single entitled "Stand by...", exclusively on digital platforms. The song, written and composed by Hitomi herself, served as the opening theme for the TV Tokyo drama series Kono Ai wa Machigai desu ka: Furin no Shokuzai (Is This Love a Mistake?: Atonement for Adultery), which premiered on January 7 of that year. Additionally, she held the concert Hitomi Live 2026: Stand By at the Duo Music Exchange in Shibuya, Tokyo, on March 28, 2026.

== Personal life ==
On December 1, 2002 Hitomi married Keisuke Uesugi, a businessman and former member of hip-hop group Gasboys. They divorced in November 2007. On July 11, 2008, she disclosed her second marriage to actor Masayoshi Haneda, and her four-month pregnancy. She gave birth to a baby girl on December 23, 2008. She and Haneda filed for divorce on December 6, 2011, and it was made public that they had already been living separately for over six months. In June 2014, Hitomi announced that she was five-month pregnant of her second child, a boy, and was engaged to the father. Her third son was born two years later on October 22, 2016, by her third husband as well. In 2020, on her 44th birthday, Hitomi announced her fourth pregnancy. Hitomi announced via her Instagram that she gave birth to a baby boy on July 23, 2020.

== Discography ==
=== Studio albums ===
- Go to the Top (1995)
- By Myself (1996)
- Déjà-vu (1997)
- Thermo Plastic (1999)
- Love Life (2000)
- Huma-rhythm (2002)
- Traveler (2004)
- Love Concent (2006)
- Love Life 2 (2009)
- Spirit (2011)
- Möbius (2012)
