= MTV Unplugged (Hitomi Yaida album) =

Video by Hitomi Yaida
- Released: 7 December 2005
- Recorded: 24 April 2005 Tokyo FM Hall
- Genre: J-pop
- Label: Aozora (ZZBD-80015)

Hitomi Yaida video release chronology
Hitomi Yaida Music in the Air: Dome Live 2004 (2005)	MTV Unplugged (2005)

MTV Unplugged is the DVD release from Hitomi Yaida of her performance for MTV Unplugged.

Recorded in the Tokyo FM Hall in April 2005, this performance was shown on an episode of MTV Unplugged broadcast on MTV Japan.

Yaida became the 3rd Japanese performing artist to appear on MTV Unplugged, the others being Ken Hirai and Hikaru Utada.

Presented as a 2-DVD package, the second DVD featured a behind-the-scenes documentary about the creation of this recording.

A selection of the songs performed also appeared in audio form on the CD Sound Drop MTV Unplugged+Acoustic Live 2005.

== DVD 1 track listing ==
#	Title	Romanization	Translation
1	キャンドル	Kyandoru	Candle
2	I Really Want to Understand You		
3	Ring My Bell		
4	How?		
5	ねえ	Ne	Well
6	Life's Like a Love Song		
7	Fast Car (Note: Yaida's Japanese version of the Tracy Chapman song (see Fast Car).)		
8	津軽海峡・冬景色		
9	マーブル色の日	Marble-iro No Hi	Marble coloured day
10	モノクロレター	Monokuroretaa	Monochrome Letter
11	I Can Fly		
12	My Sweet Darlin'		
13	ビルを見下ろす屋上で	Biru wo Miorosu Okujou	
14	手と涙	Te to Namida	Hands and Tears
