= Avex =

Japanese entertainment conglomerate

Avex Inc.
- Logo used since 2017

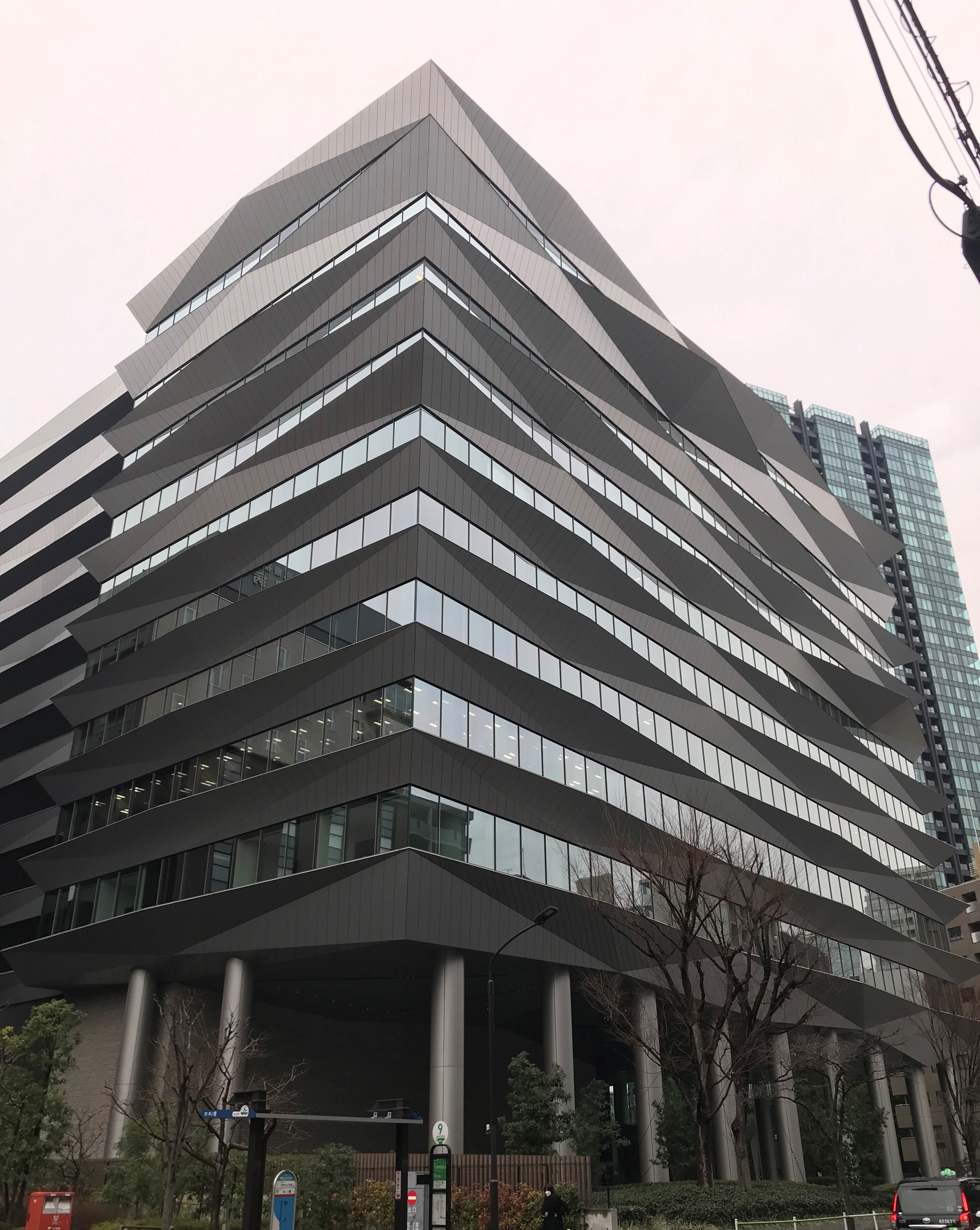
- Headquarters in Minato, Tokyo
- Native name: エイベックス株式会社
- Formerly: Avex D.D. Inc. (1988–1998); Avex Inc. (1998–2004); Avex Group Holdings, Inc. (2004–2017)
- Type: Public KK; Industrial keiretsu
- Traded as: TYO: 7860
- Founded: April 11, 1988; 38 years ago (as Avex D.D., Inc.)
- Founder: Max Matsuura; Tom Yoda; Ken Suzuki
- Headquarters: Sumitomo Fudosan Azabu-Juban Building, Mita, Minato, Tokyo, Japan
- Area served: East Asia, United States
- Key people: Max Matsuura (Chairman); Katsumi Kuroiwa (President and CEO); Shinji Hayashi (CFO)
- Services: Music production, publishing, and artist development and management
- Revenue: ▲¥146.57 billion (US$925.81 million) (2025)
- Net income: ▲¥3.55 billion (US$22.44 million) (2025)
- Total assets: ▲¥110.79 billion (US$699.82 million) (2025)
- Total equity: ▲¥52.89 billion (US$334.07 million) (2025)
- Owner: CyberAgent (12.94%); Master Trust Bank of Japan (10.44%); T Capital Partners (8.00%); Max (5.41%); Others (63.21%)
- Number of employees: 1,372 (2025)
- Subsidiaries: see subsidiaries
- Website: www.avex.co.jp

Avex Inc. (Japanese: エイベックス株式会社, romanized: Eibekkusu kabushiki gaisha /əˈvɛks/ /ˈeɪvɛks/, commonly known as and stylized in all lowercase as avex) is a Japanese entertainment conglomerate led by founder Max Matsuura and headquartered in Tokyo, Japan. Founded in 1988, the company manages J-pop talents like Ayumi Hamasaki, TVXQ! and internet sensation PikoTaro. It has also shifted into other business domains like anime, video games and live music events, partnering with Ultra Music Festival and hosting the annual A-nation. The company is a member of the Mitsubishi UFJ Financial Group (MUFG) keiretsu.

== Name ==
AVEX is an acronym of the English words Audio Visual EXpert. Since its foundation, its corporate name was Avex D.D., Incorporated, and ten years later it was changed to Avex, Incorporated.

The current name, Avex Group Holdings, Incorporated, was adopted in 2004 as part of reconstruction process after Tom Yoda's resignation. Avex Group Holdings, Incorporated was used for the main subsidiaries, while the old name (Avex, Incorporated) was for entertainment components of the Group.

In 2005, Avex, Incorporated became Avex Entertainment, Incorporated, and stayed on as part of the Group.

== History ==
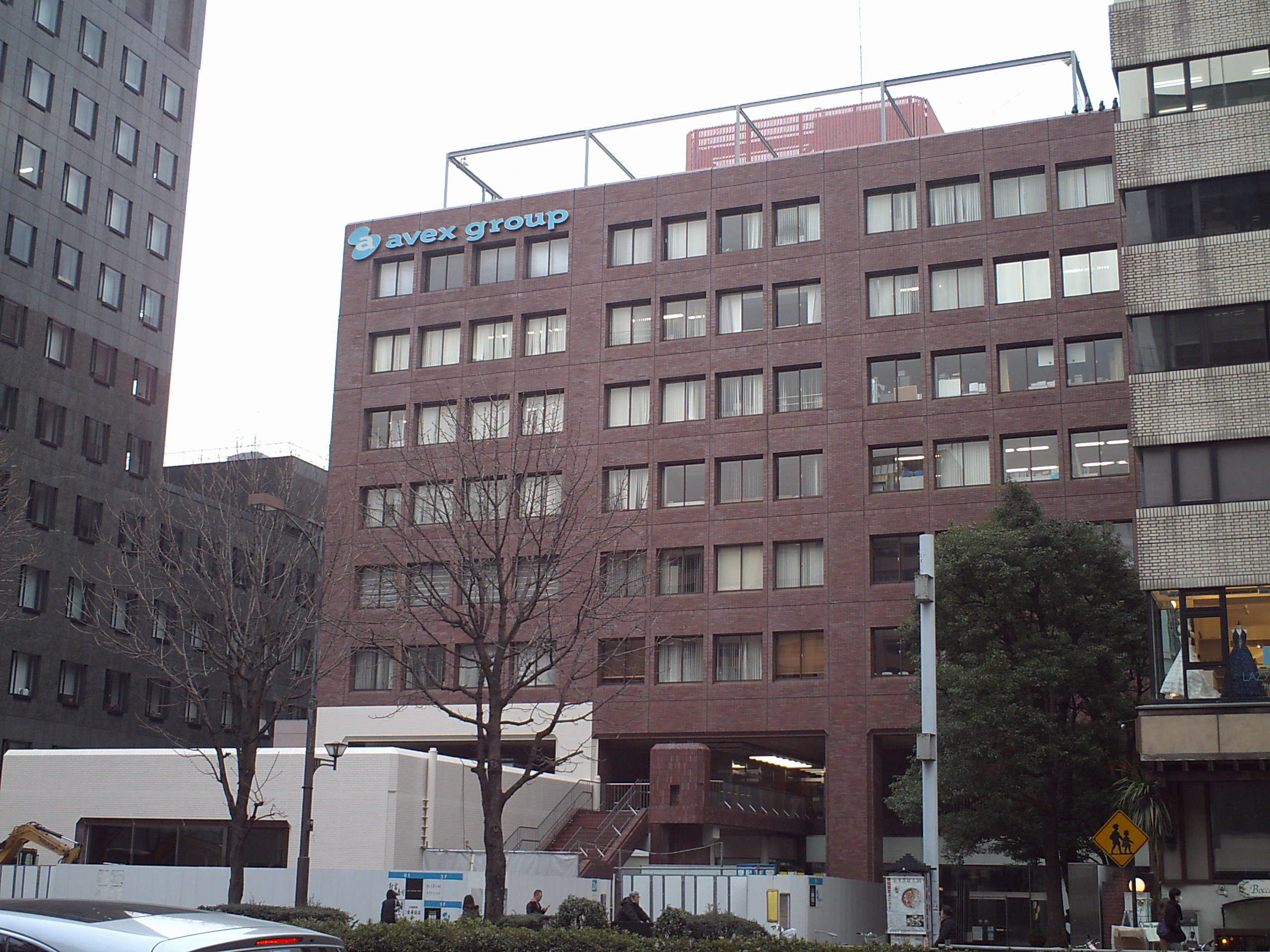
The Avex Building, finished in 2002 and funded by Sumitomo Life, in Minami-Aoyama, Tokyo

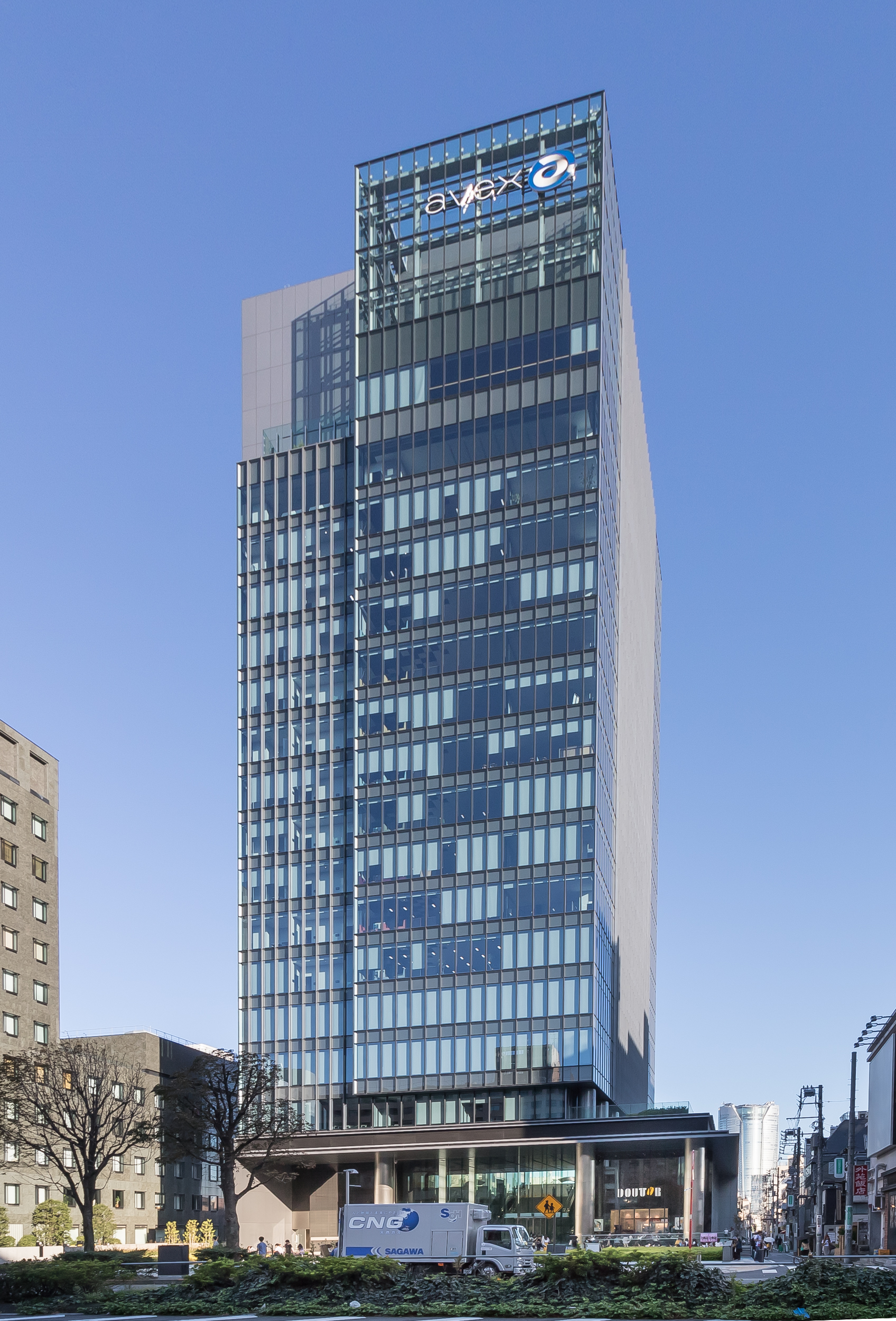
The headquarters of the company until 2021

Avex Group logo used from 2000 to 2017

=== 1988–1999: The early years ===
Avex was registered June 1, 1973, as Avex D.D. Incorporated (エイベックス・ディー・ディー株式会社, Eibekkusu Di Di Kabushiki Gaisha), although it did not become established until 1988. They began as a CD wholesaler based in Machida, Tokyo. In September 1990, they opened a recording studio and created Avex Trax as a music label. In the same year, they created "Musique Folio Inc.", a music publishing company, which became "Prime Direction Inc."

In 1993, they transferred to Aoyama, Tokyo and created a U.S. branch, called "AV Experience America Inc." The year also marked the first of Avex's yearly events. It was held in Tokyo Dome under the name "avex rave '93" and attracted 50,000 attendees. This led to the creation of the Cutting Edge label.

In 1994, they formed two UK subsidiaries, "Rhythm Republic Limited" and "Avex U.K. Limited". Later that year, they opened a disco, claimed on their website to be "the world's largest scale disco", named Velfarre.

In 1997, they opened a series of concert halls called "Zepp" with Sony Music Entertainment Japan. In early 1999, they signed an agreement with Walt Disney Records and Hollywood Records (record labels both owned by The Walt Disney Company) to handle the companies' Japanese CD releases, after WDC had taken a small stake in Avex the previous year. Later that year "Avex Mode", an animation company, was established. In December, the company was listed on the 1st section of the Tokyo Stock Exchange under the ticker symbol 7860.

=== 2000–2009: Times of unity and divisiveness ===
In 2001, Avex opened the "avex artists academy" music school.

In 2002, they released the "CCCD", a type of copy-protected CD, and opened their building in Aoyama, paid for by Sumitomo Life and worth 205 billion yen.

In 2003, they opened a classical music business (named Avex Classics).

In January 2004, they began selling Japanese music CDs in South Korea. In December of that same year, President Max Matsuura "spotted" former idol Ami Suzuki performing live at the annual festival of their school, Nihon University. He subsequently signed her to the Avex label.

In 2005, Avex acquired distribution rights for Aozora Records' catalogue including all future Hitomi Yaida releases.

In early 2008, Avex partnered with Victor JVC to officially create the label D-topia Entertainment as a business partnership between the labels and its founder, Terukado Onishi, with the sales promotion handled by Victor while the area promotion handled by Avex. As part of the Avex Group's 20th anniversary celebration, a big project occurred with Avex Trax's "produced by Avex Trax" artists; the band Girl Next Door, formed and debuted in September 2008.

Avex Group launched its own IPTV service, BeeTV, May 2009 in partnership with NTT DoCoMo.

==== 2004: Internal feud: Max Matsuura v. Tom Yoda ====
In August 2004, a feud between Max Matsuura and co-founder Tom Yoda affected the group. It started because of Yoda's ambition to expand Avex into other entertainment-related ventures, especially producing movies. In addition, he accused Ryuhei Chiba, the company's executive director and president of Avex Inc. (now Avex Planning and Development), of pursuing personal profit from a few big artists.

July 30: In a board meeting, Yoda introduced a resolution calling on Chiba to resign because of an alleged conflict of interest. A source says the disagreement arose because Chiba had signed an artist managed by a member of his family. The board backed Yoda's resolution in a 6–1 vote. However, Matsuura — described by insiders as a close ally of Chiba — introduced a second resolution demanding that Yoda step down due to "a difference of opinion in management principles". Matsuura's motion was defeated 5–2. He and Chiba resigned the next day.

August 2: Matsuura and Chiba announced their resignations in a meeting with employees of Avex. Chiba denied any fault, while Matsuura complained that Avex had lost its love of music and said he wanted to start over. They had the support of many staff who also said they would quit. More significantly, the label's top star, Ayumi Hamasaki, said she would leave. As a result, Avex's stocks in the TSE fell by 16 percent that day.

August 3: Due to pressure by employees and artists and to save the company from bankruptcy, Yoda resigned and was replaced by Toshio Kobayashi.

=== 2010–present ===
AGHD is listed at the Frankfurt Stock Exchange and Börse München of Germany under the ticker symbol AX8.

More K-pop artists from other agencies continued to sign with Avex such as SM Entertainment's TVXQ (2006), YG Entertainment's 2NE1 (2010), S-plus Entertainment's SS501 member Kim Hyung Jun (2011), Pledis Entertainment's After School (2011), NH Media's U-KISS (2011) and Yejeon Media's Shu-I (2011).

On July 21, 2011, it was announced that Avex had paired with Korean management label YG Entertainment to form YGEX.

In 2012, the group began offering limited releases for sale, DRM-free for the first time within Japan on Amazon MP3. Max Matsuura and Toshio Kobayashi, the company's top two individual shareholders, launched their own investment companies to anchor their shares in 2012.

As a show of modernization, Avex Group moved to Izumi Garden Tower in Roppongi in October 2014. The company was designated to the 36th floor – the former address of DWANGO.

On February 15, 2017, Avex Group discontinued all foreign exports of Blu-rays, DVDs, and CDs published under their Avex Pictures label. A spokesperson said the action was taken due to unspecified rights issues.

==== North American expansion, Avex Music Group ====
In 2020, the company established a publishing joint venture with S10 Entertainment, a Los Angeles-based music company founded by Brandon Silverstein. In 2024, Avex USA invested in S10's artist management business. In March 2025, Avex acquired the S10 Music Publishing catalogue. In September 2026, Avex acquired an 85% stake in S10 Entertainment, with an agreement to acquire the remaining shares and reach full ownership over time. Following the acquisition, Silverstein continued as chief executive officer of S10 Entertainment and Avex Music Group, while taking on a broader role in Avex's global music strategy.

In 2021, Avex expanded its North American operations with the establishment of Avex USA, based in Los Angeles, California, to develop its presence in the US music market. In February 2022, Avex USA entered into a global administration agreement with Sony Music Publishing to manage its music catalogue and support international songwriting collaborations. The company also established Avex House, a creative facility in West Hollywood featuring recording studios and production facilities. In 2025, former Avex USA CEO Naoki Osada launched Nebula17, an independent music venture focused on international music development.

== Subsidiaries ==
In April 2010, the Avex Group corporation was re-structured to establish Avex Music Publishing Inc. as a consolidated subsidiary, in a corporate spin-off of music publishing division of Avex Group Holdings Inc. Thus the Avex Group became a pure holding company, with a corporate structure as follows:

=== Domestic ===
==== Avex Entertainment Inc. ====
===== Avex Music Creative Inc. =====
====== Music labels ======
- Avex Casa (house music and electronica)
- Avex Classics (classical music)
- Avex Globe (globe's label; defunct since 2019)
- Avex Ideak (joint venture with KADOMATSU.T; defunct since 1998)
- Avex International (international releases)
- Avex IO
- Avex Trance (trance music)
- Avex Rush
- ZOOM FLICKER
- Avex Trax (first record label of the group (1990))
- Avex Tune (dance music)
- Xgalx
- B-ME (joint venture with BMSG)
- Binyl Records (rock music)
  - Dive in! Disc
  - Gokukara Records (joint venture with Marty Friedman)
  - PopTop
- Blowgrow
- Commmons (joint venture with Ryuichi Sakamoto)
- Cross-A
- Cutting Edge (second record label of the Group (1993.12))
- Dimension Point (Namie Amuro's label)
- Disc du Soleil
- Dois Irmaos (Lisa Ono)
- Espionage Records (joint venture with Verbal)
- Five-D Plus
- Foxtrot (joint venture with Rams Incorporated)
- FRAME (joint venture with Level-5; founded by the latter with Up-Front Works)
- Hach Entertainment (joint venture with NTT SmartConnect)
- Hi-BPM Studio (Eurobeat)
- HPQ (Visual kei)
- Idol Street (for idol performers, launched October 2, 2010, by Tatsuo Higuchi)
- Island Records
- J-Friends Project
- J-More
- Justa Music
- Locomusic (Love-chan's label)
- Love Life Records (Hitomi's label)
- Mad Pray Records (Anna Tsuchiya's label)
- Maximum 10
- MENT RECORDING (joint venture with Johnny & Associates)
- Motorod Records
- nakedrecords
- Oorong Records (joint venture with Oorong-sha Group)
- Rhythm Republic
- Rhythm Zone (third record label of the Group (1999))
  - Fluctus
  - Riddim Zone
  - Starz by Rhythm Zone
- Rising Records
- Sonic Groove
- Superb Trax
- Tachytelic Records (joint venture with Taku Takahashi)
- Tank Top Records
- Tearbridge Production
- The Six Dragons
- True Song Music (Dai Nagao's label)
- Velfarre Records
- YGEX (joint label with YG Entertainment)

===== Other operating companies =====
- Avex Live Creative Inc.
- Avex Music Creative Inc.
  - Avex Creative Factory Inc.
- Avex Alliance & Partners Inc.
- Avex Music Publishing Inc.
- Avex Classics International Inc.
- Avex Fan Marketing Inc.
- Avex Technologies Inc.
  - fuzz, Inc.
- Avex Management Inc.
- Avex Healthcare Empower LLC.
- Avex Clan Inc.
- Avex Styles Inc.
- Avex Management Agency Inc.
- Avex Creator Agency Inc.
  - Virtual Avex Inc.
  - LIVESTAR Inc.

==== Avex Pictures Inc. ====
- Avex Animation Labels Inc.
- Flagship Line Inc.
- Avex Film Labels Inc.
- aNCHOR Inc.
- The Anime Times Company Inc.

==== Avex AY Factory LLC ====
- Avex Asunaro Company Inc.

=== Overseas ===
- Avex Asia Pte. Ltd.
  - Avex China Inc.
  - Avex Hong Kong Ltd.
  - Avex Taiwan Inc.
  - Avex Saudi Arabia LLC
- Avex Music Group

== Affiliate companies ==
- Memory-Tech Holdings Inc.
- AWA CO.Ltd
- HI&max Inc.

== Labels distributed ==
- A stAtion (Ayaka's own record label), since 2012.
- AKS Co., Ltd. (AKB48's agency), since 2006. (Avex currently handles AKS' DVD releases.)
- Aozora Records, since 2005.
  - GMT Records, since 2005.
- Armada Music
- avex-classics, since 2003.
- CAM Entertainment, since 2008.
- D-topia Entertainment, since 2008. (co-distributed with Victor Entertainment and Universal Music Japan)
- Danger Crue Records, from 2006 to 2012. (now handled by Sony Music Japan)
- Disney Music Group, from 1999 to present (co-handled with Universal Music Group from 2018 for albums when live converts are handled by Avex).
- Fluxus Entertainment
- Free-Will
  - ISM Label (kannivalism's label), since 2006.
- HATS Unlimited (Taro Hakase's label)
  - AG Label
- Higashiyakena Soundbuilder (HY's label), since 2000.
- I Scream Records, since 2010. (Japan only)
- Johnny & Associates (Taiwan and Hong Kong only)
  - J Storm
  - Johnny's Entertainment
- Kontor Records
- P-Vine Records (co-distributed with Victor Entertainment and BMG Japan/Sony Music Japan)
  - Almond Eyes
  - Kai-san Factory
- SM Entertainment, since 2000.
- S2S Pte. Ltd. (Japan only)
- Toy's Factory (Taiwan only, since 2012)
- Vamprose, since 2008. (Vamps and Monoral's label)
- Vandit
- Yamaha Music Communications Inc., since 2006.
  - contemode

== Promotional projects ==
- Aoyama Christmas Circus (annual Christmas tree lighting event)

== IFPI membership ==
The Group is a member of the IFPI for Hong Kong and Japan.

== A-Nation ==
Each year since 2002, Avex has hosted a summer concert tour around Japan, "A-Nation", featuring the company's most successful acts. It is held every weekend in August in different Japanese cities. Top Avex acts like Ayumi Hamasaki, Kumi Koda, AAA, Ai Otsuka, BIGBANG, BOA, Do As Infinity, Hitomi, TRF, Every Little Thing and TVXQ perform to major crowds each year. In 2008, Namie Amuro made her first appearance at A-Nation and performed on all dates that year. For the first time in 2012, Kumi Koda did not perform due to her pregnancy.

Festival sponsors include Joe Weider and his Weider fitness products, Seven & I Holdings Co., NTT DoCoMo, Mizuno Corp., Nissay (through its You May Dream! Project), and others.

== International partners ==
- USA – Morgan Rich Corporation/Universal Music Group
- South Korea – SM Entertainment, YG Entertainment, KT Music
- Philippines – Universal Records
- Thailand – BEC-TERO Music
- China P.R. – China Record (Shanghai) Corporation

== See also ==
- List of artists under the Avex Group
- List of record labels
- D.League
- Sony Music Entertainment Japan (one-time shareholder of Avex)
- Velfarre
