= Monochrome Letter =

"モノクロレター"

Single by Hitomi Yaida

from the album Here Today – Gone Tomorrow
- Released: October 27, 2004
- Genre: J-pop
- Length: 16:20
- Label: Toshiba EMI (TOCT-4788)
- Songwriter(s): Hitomi Yaida
- Producer(s): Akira Murata & Hitomi Yaida

Hitomi Yaida singles chronology
"Chapter01/Marble-iro no Hi" (2004)	"モノクロレター" (2004)	"Mawaru Sora" (2005)

"Monokuro-retā (モノクロレター, Monochrome Letter)" is the twelfth Japanese single release from Hitomi Yaida. It is also the second single released from the album Here Today – Gone Tomorrow.

It included the CD-Extra PV for Monochrome Letter, with a limited edition release also including photos from two tours entitled Yaiko/Rocks/50Rounds & Girls Talk 2004 Digest.

The single reached number seven in the charts on November 6, 2004

== Track listing ==
All tracks are written by Hitomi Yaida

CD
No.	Title	Arranger(s)	Length
1.	"Monokuro-retā (モノクロレター; lit. Monochrome Letter) "	Akira Murata & Hitomi Yaida	4:56
2.	"Uma to Ninjin (馬と人参; lit. Horse and Carrot) "	Akira Murata & Daishi Kataoka & Hitomi Yaida	4:17
Total length:			16:20
