= B'coz I Love You =

2000 single by Hitomi Yaida

Single by Hitomi Yaida

from the album daiya-monde
- Released: July 12, 2000
- Genre: J-pop
- Length: 12:05
- Label: Toshiba EMI (TOCT-22093)
- Songwriter(s): Yaiko
- Producer(s): Diamond Head

Hitomi Yaida singles chronology
"Howling" (2000)	"B'coz I Love You" (2000)	"I Like 2" (2000)

"B'coz I Love You" is a song by Hitomi Yaida, released as her first single after signing distribution contracts with Toshiba EMI.

It reached number 16 in the Oricon charts and remains a fan favourite at her live performances.

== Track listing ==
All tracks are written by Yaiko, arranged by Diamond Head

CD
No.	Title	Length
1.	"B'coz I Love You"	3:17
2.	"Stay"	4:37
3.	"Nē (ねぇ; Please)"	4:05
Total length:		12:05

== Other appearances ==
"B'coz I Love You" appeared in the arcade video games Drummania 4th Mix and GuitarFreaks 5th Mix.

== Personnel ==
- Hitomi Yaida - Music and Writing
- Diamond Head - Backing and Production
- Murata Akira - Keyboards and Programming
- Susumu Nishikawa - Electric and Acoustic Guitars and Bass on "B'coz I Love You"
- Takashi Saito - Electric Bass on "Stay" and "Ne"
- Katsumi Usui - Drums and percussion on "B'cos I Love You" and "Nē"
