= Chapter01/Marble-iro no Hi =

"Hitori Jenga (Chapter01/マーブル色の日)"

Single by Hitomi Yaida

from the album Here Today – Gone Tomorrow
- Released: March 17, 2004
- Genre: J-pop
- Length: 16:20
- Label: Toshiba EMI (TOCT-22236)
- Songwriter(s): Hitomi Yaida
- Producer(s): Daishi Kataoka & Akira Murata & Hitomi Yaida

Hitomi Yaida singles chronology
"'Hitori Jenga'" (2003)	"Hitori Jenga (Chapter01/マーブル色の日)" (2004)	"'Monochrome Letter'" (2004)

Chapter01/Marble-iro no Hi (マーブル色の日, Marble coloured day) is the eleventh Japanese single release from Hitomi Yaida. It is also the first single released from the album Here Today – Gone Tomorrow. Also released as a limited edition with CD-Extra options with the associated PV's.

It peaked at number 9 in the Japanese charts on March 27, 2004.

== Track listing ==
All tracks are written by Hitomi Yaida, arranged by Daishi Kataoka & Akira Murata & Hitomi Yaida

No.	Title	Length
1.	"Chapter01"	4:04
2.	"Marble-iro no Hi (マーブル色の日; lit. Marble coloured day) "	2:59
3.	"Tsuki no Namida (月のなみだ; lit. Tears of the moon) "	4:59

Bonus track
No.	Title	Length
4.	"Hello"	4:18
Total length:		16:20
