= Colorhythm =

Studio album by Hitomi Yaida
- Released: 5 March 2008
- Genre: J-pop
- Label: Aozora (ZZCD-80025)
- Producer: Akira Murata & Hitomi Yaida

Hitomi Yaida chronology
| It's a New Day (2006) | Colorhythm (2008) | Vivid Moments (2011) |

Colorhythm is the seventh album by Hitomi Yaida, released on 5 March 2008.

== Track listing ==
All tracks are written by Hitomi Yaida, arranged by Hitomi Yaida & Akira Murata.

CD
| No. | Title | Length |
|---|---|---|
| 1. | "YES" | 1:52 |
| 2. | "Happy Spinner (ハッピースピナー)" | 3:49 |
| 3. | "Miracle Wiper (ミラクルワイパー)" | 4:36 |
| 4. | "Never Land iki (ネバーランド行き; Go to Neverland)" | 5:02 |
| 5. | "Siren" | 4:18 |
| 6. | "I Love you no katachi (I Love Youの形)" | 3:39 |
| 7. | "Koi Bus ~colorhyhtm ver.~ (恋バス ～colorhythm ver.～)" | 4:09 |
| 8. | "Hane yume (ハネユメ)" | 5:09 |
| 9. | "Dokidoki no tsubomi (ドキドキのつぼみ)" | 5:06 |
| 10. | "Kutsuoto (靴音; Footsteps)" | 5:04 |
| 11. | "Kimi Koso Michishirube (君こそ道しるべ)" | 4:28 |
| 12. | "Not Enough" | 4:13 |
| 13. | ".~period~" | 1:54 |
