= Go My Way (Hitomi Yaida song) =

Single by Hitomi Yaida

from the album It's a New Day
- Released: March 15, 2006
- Genre: J-pop
- Length: 8:30
- Label: Aozora Records (ZZCD-80018)
- Songwriter(s): Hitomi Yaida
- Producer(s): Akira Murata & Hitomi Yaida

Hitomi Yaida singles chronology
| "Mawaru Sora" (2005) | "Go My Way" (2006) | "Startline" (2006) |

"Go My Way" is the fourteenth Japanese single release from Hitomi Yaida. It is also the first single released from the album It's a New Day. It reached number 11 in the Japan Top 20 chart on March 25, 2006.

The song "Go My Way" is covered in the rhythm games Moero! Nekketsu Rhythm Damashii Osu! Tatakae! Ouendan 2 for the Nintendo DS, and in GuitarFreaks V3 and DrumMania V3, released for arcades and for the PlayStation 2.

== Track listing ==
All tracks are written by Hitomi Yaida, arranged by Akira Murata & Hitomi Yaida.

CD
| No. | Title | Length |
|---|---|---|
| 1. | "Go My Way" | 4:42 |
| 2. | "Kitchen" | 3:48 |
