= Mawaru Sora =

"Mawaru Sora (マワルソラ)"

Single by Hitomi Yaida

from the album Here Today – Gone Tomorrow
- Released: July 6, 2005
- Genre: J-pop
- Length: 8:32
- Label: Toshiba EMI (TOCT-4860)
- Songwriter(s): Hitomi Yaida
- Producer(s): Akira Murata & Hitomi Yaida

Hitomi Yaida singles chronology
"Monochrome Letter" (2004)	"Mawaru Sora (マワルソラ)" (2005)	"Go My Way" (2006)

"Mawaru Sora (マワルソラ, Spinning Sky)" is the thirteenth Japanese single release from Hitomi Yaida. It is also the third single released from the album Here Today – Gone Tomorrow.

This track featured on the closing credits to the localised version of the motion picture Robots, with film clips appearing in the PV.

The limited edition CD-Extra release included the PV for Mawaru Sora.

The single reached number 15 in the Oricon charts on July 16, 2005.

== Track listing ==
All tracks are written by Hitomi Yaida, arranged by Akira Murata & Hitomi Yaida

No.	Title	Length
1.	"Mawaru Sora (マワルソラ; lit. Spinning Sky)"	4:11
2.	"Biru wo Miorosu Okujō (ビルを見下ろす屋上で; lit. On the Rooftop Overlooking the Buildings)"	4:21
Total length:		8:32
