= Buzzstyle =

Single by Hitomi Yaida

from the album Candlize
- Released: September 27, 2001
- Genre: J-pop
- Length: 7:54
- Label: Toshiba EMI (TOCT-4333)
- Songwriter(s): Yaiko
- Producer(s): Diamond Head

Hitomi Yaida singles chronology
"Look Back Again/Over the Distance" (2001)	"Buzzstyle" (2001)	"Ring My Bell" (2002)

"Buzzstyle" is a song by Hitomi Yaida, released as her fifth Japanese single. It is also the third single taken from the album Candlize.

It was used as the drama Kangei! Danjiki Goikkōsama's theme song.

It reached number 3 in the charts on October 13, 2001.

The associated PV was filmed in and around the Big-Top of Gerry Cottle's circus (see List of famous circuses and circus owners) and featured many of the acts.

The track was also re-written in English and released in 2001 as "Buzzstyle (Find My Way)" by the Irish group Bellefire.

== Track listing ==
All tracks are written by Yaiko, arranged by Diamond Head

CD
No.	Title	Length
1.	"Buzzstyle"	4:17
2.	"Tokitsukaze (時つ風; fair wind)"	3:30
Total length:		7:54
