= Candlize =

Studio album by Hitomi Yaida
- Released: 31 October 2001
- Genre: J-pop, Rock music
- Length: 40:54
- Label: Toshiba EMI (TOCT-24655)
- Producer: Diamond Head & Hitomi Yaida

Hitomi Yaida chronology
Daiya-monde (2000)	Candlize (2001)	I/flancy (2002)

Singles from Candlize
- 1. "I'm Here Saying Nothing" Released: January 24, 2001; 2. "Look Back Again/Over the Distance" Released: June 24, 2001; 3. "Buzzstyle" Released: September 27, 2001

Professional ratings
Review scores
Source	Rating
J-fan	5/5 stars

Candlize is the second album by Hitomi Yaida released on 31 October 2001. The album title is the coined word which means "the flame of the candle projected onto a pupil" and which was created by Yaida. (Candlize=Candle+Eyes)

== Track listing ==
All tracks are written by Yaiko, arranged by Diamond Head

CD
No.	Title	Length
1.	"Kyandoru (キャンドル; Candle)"
2.	"Buzzstyle"
3.	"Look Back Again"
4.	"Not Still Over"
5.	"Over the Distance" (album version)
6.	"I'm Here Saying Nothing" (album version)
7.	"Sora no Tsukurikata (空の作り方; How to Make the Sky)"
8.	"Zeitaku na Sekai (贅沢な世界; Extravagant World)"
9.	"Te to Namida (手と涙; Hands and Tears)"
10.	"Life's Like a Love Song"
11.	"Maze"
