= Mikansei no Melody =

Single by Hitomi Yaida

from the album I/flancy
- Released: December 4, 2002
- Genre: J-pop
- Length: 11:45
- Label: Toshiba EMI (TOCT-4440)
- Songwriter(s): Yaiko
- Producer(s): Diamond Head & Hitomi Yaida

Hitomi Yaida singles chronology
"Andante" (2002)	"Mikansei no Melody" (2002)	"Koduku na Cowboy" (2003)

Mikansei no Melody (未完成のメロディ, Unfinished Melody) is the eighth Japanese single release from Hitomi Yaida. It is also the third single taken from the album I/flancy.

It peaked at number ten in the charts on December 14, 2002.

== Track listing ==
All tracks are written by Yaiko, arranged by Diamond Head & Yaiko

CD
No.	Title	Length
1.	"Mikansei no Melody (未完成のメロディ; Unfinished Melody)"	3:46
2.	"Andante" (Acoustic Live @2002.9.25 Shubuya-Ax)	3:44
3.	"Mikansei no Melody (未完成のメロディ; Unfinished Melody)" (Acoustic Live @2002.9.25 Shubuya-Ax)	4:15
Total length:		11:45

DVD
No.	Title	Length
1.	"Mikansei no Melody (未完成のメロディ; Unfinished Melody)" (Music video)
