= Howling (Hitomi Yaida song) =

2000 single by Hitomi Yaida

Single by Hitomi Yaida

from the album daiya-monde
- Released: 3 May 2000
- Genre: J-pop
- Label: Aozora Records ZORA-001
- Songwriter(s): Yaiko
- Producer(s): Diamond Head

Hitomi Yaida singles chronology
| "Nothing" (1999) | "Howling" (2000) | "B'coz I Love You" (2000) |

Howling is Hitomi Yaida's debut single under the name of Hitomi Yaida. It was released independently by Aozora Records on May 3, 2000.

Although only available in the Kansai region of Japan, the single reached number 50 on the Oricon charts. As a result of its popularity, Yaida was subsequently offered a recording contract with Toshiba-EMI.

This was Aozora's first ever release as the label itself was established the same day as the single was released. Aozora benefited from the attention this single attracted, also selling distribution contracts to Toshiba-EMI for its future catalogue.

== Track listing ==
All tracks are written by Yaiko, arranged by Diamond Head

CD
| No. | Title | Length |
|---|---|---|
| 1. | "How?" |
| 2. | "I Like" |
| 3. | "We'll Be..." |
| Total length: | | 12:00 |

== Personnel ==
- Hitomi Yaida - Music and Writing
- Diamond Head - Backing and Production
- Takashi Saito - Electric Bass on "How?" and "I Like", Electric Bass and Percussion on "I Like" and Wood Bass on "We'll Be..."
