= I/flancy =

Studio album by Hitomi Yaida
- Released: 9 October 2002
- Genre: J-pop, Rock music
- Label: Toshiba EMI (TOCT-24889)
- Producer: Diamond Head ＆ Hitomi Yaida

Hitomi Yaida chronology
Candlize (2001)	I/flancy (2002)	Air/Cook/Sky (2003)

Singles from I/flancy
- 1. "Ring My Bell" Released: March 27, 2002; 2. "Andante" Released: July 10, 2002; 3. "Mikansei no Melody" Released: December 4, 2002

Professional ratings
Review scores
Source	Rating
J-fan	5/5 stars

I/flancy is the third album by Hitomi Yaida released on 9 October 2002. The singles from this album were "Ring My Bell", "Andante" and "Mikansei no Melody". The album title is an anagram of "i can fly".

The first pressing limited edition contains the 8cmCD single which can access the official website.

== Track listing ==
All tracks are written by Yaiko, arranged by Diamond Head

CD
No.	Title	Length
1.	"Creamed Potatoes"	3:28
2.	"Mikansei No Melody (未完成のメロディ; Unfinished Melody)"	3:44
3.	"Andante (アンダンテ; Andante)"	3:29
4.	"Ring My Bell"	4:18
5.	"Niji No Drive (虹のドライブ; Rainbow Drive)"	3:52
6.	"Change Your Mind"	3:13
7.	"Dizzy Dive"	3:25
8.	"Aitai Hito (会いたい人; The Person That I Want to See)"	3:17
9.	"I Can Fly"	5:21
10.	"I Really Want to Understand You"	4:03
11.	"Ashita Kara no Tegami (明日からの手紙; Letter from Tomorrow)"	4:50

8cmCD single: Bonus track
No.	Title	Length
12.	"Life's Like a Love Song (Live version ~2002, summer, Osaka~)" (Live)
