= Ring My Bell (Hitomi Yaida song) =

Single by Hitomi Yaida

from the album I/flancy
- Released: March 22, 2002
- Genre: J-pop
- Length: 7:47
- Label: Toshiba EMI (TOCT-4377)
- Songwriter(s): Yaiko
- Producer(s): Diamond Head & Hitomi Yaida

Hitomi Yaida singles chronology
"Buzzstyle" (2001)	"Ring My Bell" (2002)	"Andante" (2002)

"Ring My Bell" is a song by Hitomi Yaida, released as her sixth Japanese single. It is also the first single taken from the album I/flancy.

It reached number four in the Oricon charts on June 4, 2002.

== Track listing ==
All tracks are written by Yaiko, arranged by Diamond Head

CD
No.	Title	Length
1.	"Ring My Bell"	4:22
2.	"Dizzy Dive"	3:25
Total length:		7:47
