= Spółka z ograniczoną odpowiedzialnością =

Type of limited company in Poland

Spółka z ograniczoną odpowiedzialnością (lit. 'company with limited liability'), abbreviated Sp. z o.o., is the legal title of a limited company in Poland.

== Formation of an Sp. z o.o. ==
=== Overview ===
The necessary steps for establishing an Sp. z o.o. (spółka z ograniczoną odpowiedzialnością) are determined by Article 163 KSH (Kodeks spółek handlowych, eng. Commercial Companies Code). It first requires the notarization of the articles of incorporation. It must take place in Poland. The conclusion of the articles of incorporation creates a legal capacity subject, the company prior registration.

The second step requires the full payment of the share capital as codified by the articles of incorporation. Where required the payment includes the agreed surplus over the nominal value of the company share.

The share capital may be covered by cash or contribution in kind. Inalienable rights, e.g. work or services cannot place as a deposit in an Sp. z o.o.

The third step is the appointment of the board and possibly other organs of the Sp. z o.o. The Board of Directors or the first board members can already be appointed at formation. Once all deposits are paid in full, the board may register for entry into the business register. The application is inter alia accompanied by a statement of all board members that the deposits were placed to cover the common stock in full by all shareholders in the company. The registration of the company in the business register takes about two to four weeks. By registering the company in the business register, the company becomes a legal entity. After registration in the business register, the Board of Directors has to request the so-called REGON number at the statistics agency. This is issued within one to two days. Subsequently the Board of Directors has to register the company at the company's financial authorities and obtain the so-called "NIP" number (Taxpayer Identification Number) and the VAT number.

The granting of the NIP requires the submission of a lease or other proof that the company has any accommodation, also a bank account contract is required. For these reasons it is recommended that already with formation the Board of Directors is appointed. In this way, in the start-up phase before registration in the business register the company is already able to open a bank account and sign a lease agreement.

Since 2012 - it is possible to register an Sp. z o.o. online via S24 system. Sp. z o.o. registration is available only to users that hold qualified electronic signature or Polish Trusted Profile. Registration takes approx. 3-5 days.

=== Content of the articles of incorporation ===
The minimum content to be regulated the articles of incorporation determines Article 157 KSH. The articles of incorporation must contain information about the name of the company, place of business, the subject of the activity, the amount of registered capital, an indication of whether a shareholder is allowed to take over one or more company shares, the number and the nominal value of the company shares of each of the shareholders are taken and the duration of the company, if it is determined. Beyond the minimum content the shareholders are free to regulate their relationship to each other or to the company more extensive.

=== Costs of formation ===
Notable costs are first of all the notary fees, which are calculated in dependence to the share capital. If the share capital amounts e.g. 8,000 złoty (about €2,000), the maximum amount to pay is zł 100 plus 3% on the difference between share capital and zł 3,000, consequently 3% of zł 5,000. In result of this the total costs for the notary would be zł 250 (about €62). In addition the value added tax (VAT) at the legal rate from the current 23% has to be added.

Furthermore, costs incur associated with registering the company in the business register and the publication in for this responsible "monitor Gospodarczy i Sądowy" in the amount of approximately zł 1,500 (about €370). Finally, within 14 days after formation of the articles of incorporation, the so-called tax on civil law transactions (PCC) is to pay. This is 0.5% of the share capital.

== Financial condition of the Sp. z o.o. ==
=== Capital raising and capital maintenance ===
The share capital amounts to at least zł 5,000 (about €1,230 - depending on the exchange rate). The shares can either be of equal or unequal height, depending on the articles of incorporation. If a shareholder can have more than one share, the shares must be equal and indivisible. The minimum nominal value of a share amounts to zł 50 (approx. €12.5). The Polish legislator has various instruments to ensure the protection of creditors.

The share capital must be maintained throughout the life of the company. It may be reduced only in the manner allowed by law, e.g. through a capital reduction. The ban also applies to the hidden distribution of profits. A payment from the required share capital covering the company's assets is not possible for the shareholders under any title.

The shareholders are also prohibited from referring to or from the assets contributed their rightful share interest. Claims of the shareholder from a granted loan of the Sp. z o.o. applies as a contribution to the company if the loan was granted within two years before the insolvency of the Sp. z o.o. In addition, Article 14 § 4 KSH contains a setoff of maturing share payments.

The access rights of the shareholders at the company's assets are generally restricted to the distribution of certain portion of the profits.

=== Change in the share capital amount ===
The capital increase is governed by Articles 255 ff. KSH. Basically, the increase in share capital demanded the change of the articles of incorporation. This requires a notarized resolution of the shareholders' meeting and the entry into the business register. Without changing the articles of incorporation, the capital increase can be carried out only if this is expressly permitted by the articles of incorporation. The exact height to which the share capital can be raised and the exact date to which the increase take place is also a requirement have to be regulated.

The capital increase is carried out either by increasing the nominal value of existing shares or by issuing new shares (ordinary capital increase). In case of the ordinary capital increase the company's assets is increased by the new deposits, which is provided from the old or new shareholders.

In principle, the existing shareholders are entitled to acquire the new shares. The take-over declaration needs to be notarized. In the case of the nominal capital increase the share capital will be increased by retained earnings or capital reserves.

The capital reduction of share capital requires changing the articles of incorporation in general as well. The shareholders may decide either the recovery of shares or the reduction of the share value. The reduction decision has to determine the amount of the share capital reduction and the way by which the capital should be reduced.

The minimum share capital and the minimum nominal value of shares may not be affected by the reduction. The reduction of the share capital needs to declare immediately to the creditors of the company with the request to object within three months, if they do not agree with the reduction. Creditors, which contradict the deadline, are generally to be satisfied by the company or have to obtain an appropriate security for their claim.

Each corporate action becomes effective upon its entry into the business register, and thus has a constitutive effect.

== Constitutional organ of the Sp. z o.o. ==
=== The Board of Directors ===
The board consists of one or more individuals. To the board may be appointed both shareholders and third parties. Board members may be foreigners or persons resident abroad. The members of the Board are appointed and dismissed by resolution of the shareholders, unless the articles of incorporation provides otherwise, such as the appointment by the Supervisory Board.

Board members are generally appointed for one year. An excess of this one-year term of office may also be agreed. The term of office generally terminates with the date of holding of the shareholders’ meeting, which approved the financial statements for the last full financial year of the exercise of Executive Function. Board members are also free to withdraw from its role as manager.

Unless otherwise agreed in the articles of incorporation, a board member can be dismissed at any time. However, the claims arising from the employment relationship persist.

The Board conducts the business of the Sp. z o.o. and represents it externally. The legal representative of a board member cannot be confined in an external legal effect. The articles of incorporation certainly may determine the way of representation.

The legal base case therefore regulates by a multi-person board that for issuing statements on behalf of the Sp. z o.o. the interaction of two board members or one board member along with a registered manager is required.

=== Other bodies ===
The supervisory board performs constant supervision of the affairs of the company, while the audit committee the periodic supervision over . The appointment of a supervisory board or audit committee is mandatory for an Sp. z o.o. that has capital stock of more than 500,000 złoty (approximately €125,000) and also more than 25 existing shareholders. Otherwise the shareholders are responsible for including an agreement in the articles of incorporation on the appointment of a supervisory board or audit committee. Both organs consist of at least three members who are appointed or dismissed by shareholders' resolution. The duties and responsibilities of those supervisory organs include the annual audit and the examination of the annual report of the board of directors.

Finally, there is the shareholders meeting. The shareholders' meeting is furnished with extensive authorities and at the same time is the supreme decision-making body of the Sp. z o.o. itself. By operation of law, the decisions on important matters are reserved for the shareholders' meeting. The authorities include the examination and approval of the annual report of the board of directors, the profit and loss statement, the approval of the board of directors, the supervisory board and the audit committee, any decision on repayment of additional contributions, the sale or leasing out of a company and the assignment of limited real rights to it.

== Rights and obligations of shareholders ==
The main duties of the shareholders include the provision of full deposit, the compensation of excessive determined contributions in kind and the reimbursement of unjustified payments (Art. 175, 198 KSH). Under the special relation of the articles of incorporation may accrue the following duties: acquisition of administrative or supervisory duties, the obligation to recurring contributions in kind (Art. 176 KSH) or to pay further margins (Article 177 KSH).

Toward the property rights primarily belongs the right to receive dividends (Art. 192 KSH), the subscription rights (Article 258 KSH), the participation of the net profits (Art. 191 ff KSH) and the settlement proceeds (Article 286 KSH), a claim for contributions in kind (Art. 176 KSH) and the repayment of the deposit for capital reduction and cancellation of the share and the right for repayment of unused further margins (Article 179 KSH).

The administrative rights include especially the participation of corporate resolutions (Art. 227 ff KSH), the appeal of such resolutions (Article 250 KSH), minority protection, the action for dissolution of the Company and to the expulsion of shareholders (Article 271 No. 1, 266 § 1 KSH) and the individual right to obtain information and control of each shareholder (Art. 212 KSH, which can only be restricted or excluded if the appointment of a supervisory body is provided, Article 213 § 3 KSH).

Deviation from the equality in principle envisaged in terms of rights and duties of all shareholders may be prerogatives recognized under the special relation of the articles of incorporation. In particular, those prerogatives may affect the right to vote (more than three votes per share) and the right to dividend (maximum of 150% of the dividend to be paid to a non-privileged share).

== Formation and requirements ==
The formation process can be initiated through two distinct channels: the electronic S24 system maintained by the Ministry of Justice or a traditional notarial deed. The electronic path is expedited, utilizing standard contract templates, which makes it suitable for straightforward business structures. Conversely, the notarial route allows for extensive customization of the company's articles of association but necessitates the physical presence of shareholders or their attorneys. Regardless of the method chosen, the electronic submission of documents to the National Court Register (KRS) is mandatory.

A fundamental requirement for incorporation is a minimum share capital of zł 5,000. Upon successful entry into the register, the company acquires legal personality. The entity is automatically assigned a tax identification number (NIP) and a statistical number (REGON); however, further administrative steps are required to become an active VAT payer. Additionally, new entities must report their ultimate beneficial owners to the Central Register of Beneficial Owners (CRBR) within a statutory deadline to comply with transparency regulations. Company registration in Poland - requirements and process.

== Liquidation and insolvency ==
The dissolution of an Sp. z o.o. and the associated deletion in the business register takes place after carrying out the liquidation. Further steps are governed by Article 274 ff. KSH. Causes for dissolution may result from the law as well as the articles of incorporation. Notable examples: Resolution of the shareholders to dissolve the company or to transfer the registered office abroad, the announcement of the insolvency of the company as well as a verdict of a court.

The legal basis of the insolvency of an Sp. z o.o. regulates the Polish Bankruptcy and Restructuring Law of 2003. The bankruptcy must be applied if the company is illiquid, means the company is unable pay their liabilities.

=== Summary: “Capital raising and capital maintenance” for a Polish LLC (Sp. z o.o.) ===
- The share capital (i.e. the minimal equity that must be contributed by the shareholders) in a Polish Sp. z o.o. must be at least zł 5,000.
- Shares in the company may be equal or unequal in nominal value, but the minimum nominal value of an individual share is zł 50.
- The law imposes protection for creditors by requiring that this share capital be maintained throughout the life of the company. In other words, the capital cannot be secretly reduced or distributed in a way that would undermine creditors’ rights.
- Shareholders are prohibited from making payments out of the company that would reduce the capital below the legal minimum, or from treating the capital as their own assets under any guise.
- Loans granted by the company to shareholders within two years before insolvency may be treated as additional capital contributions, essentially “substituting” for capital.
- The company may increase its share capital via:
  1. Increasing the nominal value of existing shares, or
  2. Issuing new shares A capital increase normally requires amending the articles of incorporation and a formal shareholders’ resolution.
- Conversely, reducing the share capital is also permitted, but only under strict legal procedures. The reduction cannot violate the legal minimum capital requirement. Creditors must be notified and given time to object.
- Any change (increase or decrease) becomes legally effective only after registration in the business register.
