= I'm Here Saying Nothing =

Single by Hitomi Yaida

from the album Candlize
- Released: October 4, 2001
- Genre: J-pop
- Length: 11:51
- Label: Toshiba EMI (TOCT-22136)
- Songwriter(s): Yaiko
- Producer(s): Diamond Head

Hitomi Yaida singles chronology
"Darling Darling" (2001)	"I'm Here Saying Nothing" (2001)	"Look Back Again/Over the Distance" (2001)

"I'm Here Saying Nothing" is a song by Hitomi Yaida, released as her third Japanese single. The song was taken from the album Candlize. It reached number four on the Japan Oricon charts. Meja covered this song later.

== Track listing ==
All tracks are written by Yaiko, arranged by Diamond Head

CD
No.	Title	Length
1.	"I'm Here Saying Nothing"	3:26
2.	"Life's Like a Love Song"	4:34
3.	"My Sweet Darlin' (Live@Bigcat, October 31st, 2000)" (live version)	3:43
Total length:		11:51
