= Brandon Silverstein =

American music executive (born 1991)

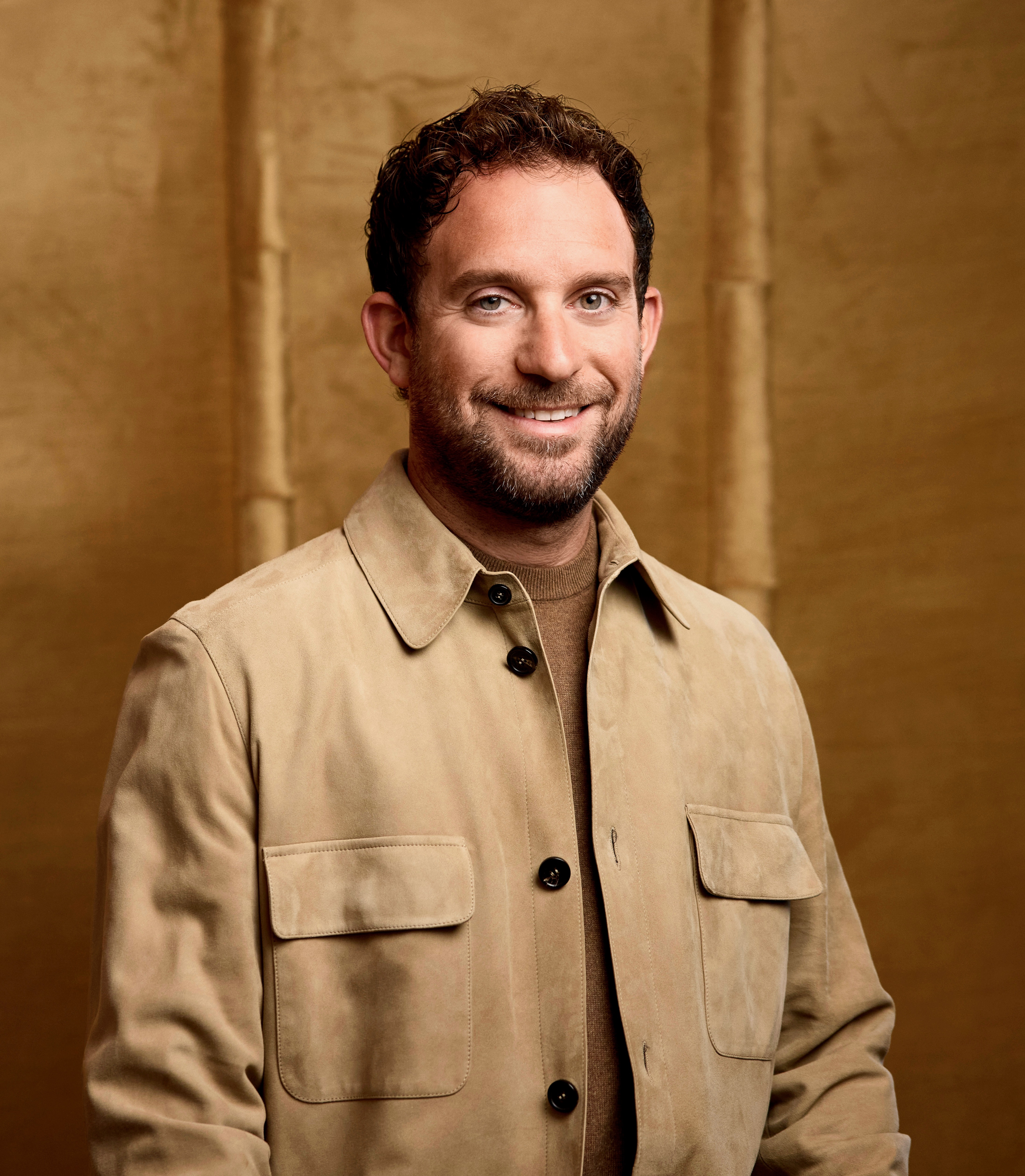
- Silverstein in 2026
- Born: September 10, 1991 (age 35)
- Occupations: Entrepreneur; industry executive; investor
- Known for: Founder and CEO, S10 Entertainment; CEO, Avex Music Group
- Spouse: Julie Silverstein

Brandon Silverstein (born September 10, 1991) is an American music executive, talent manager, and entrepreneur. He is the chief executive officer of S10 Entertainment and Avex Music Group, the global music company of Japanese entertainment conglomerate Avex Inc. Silverstein is also the founder of S10 Entertainment, a record label, artist management, music publishing, film, and investment company. Avex Music Group was created through a partnership between S10 and Avex.

Throughout his career, Silverstein has overseen projects that have yielded number-one song releases with artists, writers, and producers, generating billions of streams.

== Early life ==
While a high schooler in Tenafly, New Jersey, Silverstein created and promoted independent parties and events in New York City in addition to booking talent for Noah Tepperberg's clubs. As a freshman at Indiana University, Silverstein co-founded Bounce, an international touring EDM festival. The first iteration of the festival took place on a farm and was headlined by Avicii. In his senior year, Silverstein dropped out of college to pursue his interest in music management.

== Career ==
=== S10 Entertainment ===
After college, Silverstein returned to New York and founded S10 Entertainment & Media, which provides artist management, recording, and publishing services while doubling as an investment company. S10 Entertainment established a “creative partnership” with Jay-Z and Jay Brown’s Roc Nation in 2018.

In 2022, Silverstein’s S10 Films division partnered with Simon Fuller to develop new projects across film and television.

In 2024, Katsumi Kuroiwa, the CEO of Japanese entertainment conglomerate, Avex, announced that the company made a strategic investment into Silverstein’s S10 Entertainment.

=== S10 Publishing ===
In 2020, Silverstein launched S10 Publishing, forming partnerships with Ryan Tedder and Max Matsuura of Avex Inc. S10 Publishing’s music catalog includes songs from Justin Bieber (Peaches), Tate McRae (Greedy), Selena Gomez, Kid Laroi, Doja Cat (Agora Hills), Jack Harlow, Post Malone, Drake, Bad Bunny, and Rihanna, and has been streamed 40 billion times across its catalog as of May 2024.

In March 2025, Avex acquired S10 Music Publishing’s entire catalog of songs, integrating S10 Publishing’s catalog into Avex’s pre-existing networks.

=== Avex Music Group ===
At the same time as the March 2025 acquisition of S10 Music Publishing, Avex USA was consolidated under a new entity, Avex Music Group (AMG), and Silverstein was named as its chief executive officer. He became a partner in the company, having been given an equity stake in AMG, and joined its board of directors. Additionally, AMG holds the largest investment share of S10 Management, alongside Roc Nation and Silverstein himself.

In addition to AMG’s management and publishing services, the entity also serves as a platform to distribute Avex’s Japanese artists into international markets, supporting acts like XG.

Under Silverstein's leadership, AMG signed Bruno Mars to a global publishing partnership in March 2026. The agreement became effective in the summer of 2026 following the expiration of Mars' previous publishing arrangement with BMG/Warner Chappell. In April 2026, AMG launched a $100 million publishing catalog acquisition fund, with its first acquisition being the publishing catalog of producer and songwriter Marco "Infamous" Rodriguez, which includes “Lose Control”, the Billboard Hot 100 number one single by Teddy Swims.

== Personal life ==
Silverstein is married to his wife, Julie. They reside in the Brentwood neighborhood of Los Angeles, having purchased the former home of the late actress Angela Lansbury in 2024.

== Recognition ==
The executive has earned industry awards throughout his career, including the Forbes "30 Under 30" in 2019, Variety’s “New Leaders” in 2021, and Music Business Worldwide’s “Worlds Greatest Managers” in 2022. Billboard has honored the executive on multiple occasions, including “40 Under 40" and "Executive of the Week" in 2021, “Latin Power” in 2022, the magazine’s first-ever “Power Players’ Choice Award” and its "Power 100" list in 2023, and on its "Global Power Players" list in 2025 and 2026.
