= Hitori Jenga =

"Hitori Jenga (一人ジェンガ)"

Single by Hitomi Yaida

from the album Air/Cook/Sky
- Released: September 10, 2003
- Genre: J-pop
- Length: 14:47
- Label: Toshiba EMI (TOCT-22225)/(TOCT-22226)
- Songwriter(s): Hitomi Yaida & Mark Hewerdine
- Producer(s): Daishi Kataoka & Akira Murata & Hitomi Yaida

Hitomi Yaida singles chronology
"Kodoku na Cowboy" (2003)	"Hitori Jenga (一人ジェンガ)" (2003)	"Chapter01/Marble-iro no Hi" (2004)

"Hitori Jenga (一人ジェンガ, playing Jenga alone)" is the tenth Japanese single release from Hitomi Yaida. It is also the second single taken from the album Air/Cook/Sky. Also released as a limited edition with CD-Extra options to access a special website.

Bell, Book and Candle is a cover version of the track by Mark Hewerdine that was released on his album Thanksgiving, with Yaida's Japanese lyrics.

It reached number two in the charts on September 27, 2003.

== Track listing ==
No.	Title	Writer(s)	Arranger(s)	Length
1.	"Hitori Jenga (一人ジェンガ; lit. playing Jenga alone) "	Hitomi Yaida	Daishi Kataoka & Akira Murata & Hitomi Yaida	3:06
2.	"Bell to Hon to Candle (ベルと本とキャンドル; lit. Bell, Book and Candle)" (Mark Hewerdine (Boo Hewerdine) song)	Mark Hewerdine, words translated by Hitomi Yaida	Daishi Kataoka & Akira Murata & Hitomi Yaida	3:54

Bonus tracks ~Live From i/can fly Tour 2003~
No.	Title	Writer(s)	Arranger(s)	Length
3.	"Creamed potatoes" (live)	Yaiko	Diamond Head	4:06
4.	"Aitai Hito (会いたい人; lit. The person whom I want to meet)" (live)	Yaiko	Diamond Head	3:41
Total length:				14:47
