= It's a New Day =

It's a New Day may refer to:

- It's a New Day (album), a 2006 album by Hitomi Yaida
- "It's a New Day" (Will.i.am song)
- "It's a New Day" (James Brown song)
- "It's a New Day", a 1973 song by Skull Snaps
