= Air/Cook/Sky =

Studio album by Hitomi Yaida
- Released: 29 October 2003
- Recorded: in London, England
- Genre: J-pop
- Length: 43:00
- Label: Toshiba EMI (TOCT-25200)
- Producer: Daishi Kataoka & Akira Murata & Hitomi Yaida

Hitomi Yaida chronology
i/flancy (2002)	Air/Cook/Sky (2003)	Here today - gone tomorrow (2005)

Singles from Air/Cook/Sky
- 1. "Kodoku na Cowboy" Released: April 23, 2003; 2. "Hitori Jenga" Released: September 10, 2003

Air/Cook/Sky is the fourth album by Hitomi Yaida released on 29 October 2003. The singles from this album were "Kodoku na Cowboy" and "Hitori Jenga". The album title is an anagram of "Yaiko rocks".

== Track listing ==
All tracks are written by Yaiko, arranged by Daishi Kataoka

CD
No.	Title	Length
1.	"Mienai Hikari (見えない光; Invisible Star)"	4:26
2.	"Hitori Jenga (一人ジェンガ; Jenga Alone)"	3:06
3.	"Kodoku na Cowboy (孤独なカウボーイ; Lonely Cowboy)"	4:13
4.	"Chein (チェイン; Chain)"	4:41
5.	"Keep on movin'"	4:43
6.	"Mama to Tedi (ママとテディ; Mama and Teddy)"	2:53
7.	"Mazā (マザー; Mother)"	3:41
8.	"Are you ready? boy"	3:58
9.	"Slide show"	3:55
10.	"Hello"	4:19
11.	"Kono Koi wa Mou Shimatte Shimaou (この恋はもうしまってしまおう; It's time to end this love)"	3:37
Total length:		43:00
