= Kodoku na Cowboy =

Single by Hitomi Yaida

from the album Air/Cook/Sky
- Released: April 23, 2003
- Genre: J-pop
- Length: 7:06
- Label: Toshiba EMI (TOCT-4477)
- Songwriter(s): Hitomi Yaida
- Producer(s): Diamond Head & Hitomi Yaida

Hitomi Yaida singles chronology
| "Mikansei no Melody" (2002) | "Kodoku na Cowboy" (2003) | "Hitori Jenga" (2003) |

"Kodoku na Cowboy" (孤独なカウボーイ, Lonely Cowboy) is the ninth Japanese single release from Hitomi Yaida. It is also the first single taken from the album Air/Cook/Sky. It was used as the drama Densetsu no Madam's theme song. It was also on the soundtrack of Rugrats Go to Tokyo.

It reached number six in the charts on May 3, 2003.

== Track listing ==
All tracks are written by Hitomi Yaida, arranged by Diamond Head & Hitomi Yaida

CD
| No. | Title | Length |
|---|---|---|
| 1. | "Kodoku na Cowboy (孤独なカウボーイ; Lonely Cowboy)" | 4:13 |
| 2. | "Mama to Teddy (ママとテディ; Mom and Teddy)" (CD Extra) | 2:53 |
| Total length: | | 7:06 |
