= Yaiko's Selection =

Compilation album by Hitomi Yaida
- Released: 1 December 2004
- Genre: J-pop
- Label: Toshiba EMI (TOCT-25550)

Hitomi Yaida chronology
Single Collection (2004)	Yaiko's Selection (2004)	Sound Drop MTV Unplugged+Acoustic Live 2005 (2005)

Yaiko's Selection is an album by Japanese singer and songwriter Hitomi Yaida. It is a collection of tracks personally selected by the singer as her favourite. Originally released as part of the Single Collection/Yaiko's Selection Box Set, it was issued on its own following fan demands. Released in 2004, it peaked at No. 30 on the Japanese albums chart.

== Track listing ==
#	Title	Romanization/Translation
1	I Can Fly	
02	I Like (UK mix)	
03	キャンドル	Candle
04	マザー	Mother
05	We'll Be...	
06	会いたい人	Aitai Hito
07	Are You Ready? Boy	
08	虹のドライブ	Niji No Drive
09	ねえ	Ne
10	見えない光	Mienai Hikari
11	手と涙	Te to Namida
12	チェイン	Chain
13	Your Kiss	
14	Life's Like a Love Song	
