= It's a New Day (album) =

Studio album by Hitomi Yaida
- Released: 22 November 2006
- Genre: J-pop
- Label: Aozora Records (ZZCD-800223) (ZZCD-80222/B) Lim Ed
- Producer: Akira Murata & Hitomi Yaida

Hitomi Yaida chronology
Here Today – Gone Tomorrow (2005)	It's a New Day (2006)	Colorhythm (2008)

Limited edition cover
- Limited edition CD/DVD cover

It's a New Day is the sixth album by Hitomi Yaida released on 22 November 2006. The singles from this album are "Go My Way", "Startline", "Hatsukoi".

Released over a year after Here Today – Gone Tomorrow, this album is the first from Yaida after Aozora ceased the distribution and promotion contract with Toshiba-EMI.

A limited-edition version was also released on the same day, containing a DVD of PV's and extras. The track Midousuji Planet (御堂筋Planet, Midousuji Planet) was also released at the same time as an internet only download.

== Track listing ==
All tracks are written by Hitomi Yaida, arranged by Hitomi Yaida & Akira Murata.

CD
No.	Title	Length
1.	"Midōsuji Planet (御堂筋Planet; Midōsuji Planet)"	4:04
2.	"Yasashii Te (やさしい手; Planet)"	4:24
3.	"Startline: It's a New Version"	4:25
4.	"Chikashitsu no uzu (地下室の渦; Basement Whirlpool)"	4:04
5.	"Kitchen (キッチン)"	3:50
6.	"Hatsukoi (初恋; First Love)"	4:40
7.	"Go My Way"	4:39
8.	"Midnight Snacks (ミッドナイトスナック)"	3:39
9.	"Nani mo yaritakunai (何もやりたくない; I Don't Want to Do Anything)"	3:40
10.	"Tea-time"	3:19
11.	"37.0°C"	4:57
12.	"Oyasumi (おやすみ; Goodnight)"	10:10

DVD
No.	Title	Length
1.	"Go My Way" (Music Video)
2.	"Hatsukoi" (Music Video)
3.	"Startline" (live)
