= Andante (song) =

"アンダンテ"

Single by Hitomi Yaida

from the album i/flancy
- Released: July 10, 2002
- Genre: J-pop
- Length: 8:25
- Label: Toshiba EMI (TOCT-4400)/(TOCT-4404)
- Songwriters: Yaiko & Tracy Chapman
- Producers: Diamond◆Head & Hitomi Yaida

Hitomi Yaida singles chronology
"Ring My Bell" (2002)	"アンダンテ" (2002)	"Mikansei no Melody" (2002)

"アンダンテ (ANDANTE)" is a song by Hitomi Yaida, released as her seventh Japanese single, and the second from the album i/flancy. A limited-edition version was released also, including a different-coloured case and a CD-Extra track which could be used to access a special website to book tickets to an Hitomi Yaida performance.

The B-side track "Fast Car" is a cover version of the Tracy Chapman song. Yaida continues to perform this track live, and it appeared on her MTV Unplugged performance.

It reached number 4 in the charts on July 20, 2002.

== Track listing ==
CD
No.	Title	Writer(s)	Arranger(s)	Length
1.	"Andante"	Yaiko	Diamond Head	3:29
2.	"Fast Car" (Tracy Chapman song)	Tracy Chapman, words translated by Yaiko	Diamond Head	4:56
Total length:				8:25
