= Badself =

- Origin: Dublin, Ireland
- Genres: Rock Alternative
- Years active: 2012–present

Badself are an Irish alternative rock band, from Dublin. Karl Hussey and Bryan McMahon formerly of Future Kings of Spain teamed up with Dan Barry in 2012, quickly writing and demoing material which would go on to become their debut album. Karl and Dan were one half of teenage punk rock sensations Bambi.

Dan was one of the developers of Riffstation, the guitar app software.

== Personnel ==
- Karl Hussey – Vocals/Guitar 2012 – present
- Dan Barry – Bass 2012 – present
- Bryan McMahon – Drums 2012 – present

== Discography ==
=== The Three Daughters of Mara (2014) ===
The band's self-titled debut album was released in 2014. It was produced by (Def Leppard front of house sound engineer and co-producer) Ronan McHugh and recorded at the home studio of Joe Elliott. The album artwork is by the American artist Emily Burns.

=== "Stay Down" (2020) ===
The band released their first official music video and single, "Stay Down", in April 2020 The video is heavily inspired by classic 1980s rock videos by Survivor and Journey.
