= Avex Music Group =

Japanese-American music corporation

Avex Music Group LLC
- Formerly: Avex USA (2018–2025)
- Type: Subsidiary
- Industry: Music; Entertainment
- Founded: November 2018; 8 years ago
- Headquarters: 8255 Beverly Blvd, Los Angeles, California, United States
- Area served: North America
- Key people: Brandon Silverstein (CEO)
- Products: Music and entertainment
- Revenue: See Avex Inc.
- Parent: Avex Inc.
- Website: avex.com/us/amg

Avex Music Group LLC, also referred to as AMG, is a Japanese-American subsidiary of Avex Inc.. Headquartered in Los Angeles, the company was formed after Avex consolidated all assets and staff from Avex USA and after acquiring the catalog of S10 Music Publishing.

== History ==
=== 2018–2025: Formations as Avex USA ===
In 2018, Japanese entertainment conglomerate Avex Inc. made its third attempt in the North American market. After the dissolution of Avex International Inc. in November 2018, Avex established Avex USA Inc., a new subsidiary with focus on the United States. The company started out in a rented five-bedroom West Hollywood home, with Naoki Osada serving as chief executive officer. Osada previously worked at Avex for over two decades prior to becoming chief executive officer of Avex USA. In 2022, Avex partnered with Sony Music Publishing to publish its catalog outside Japan. Avex USA later partnered with S10 Publishing, a publishing division managed by Brandon Silverstein.

In May 2024, Avex USA began investing in S10 Entertainment. In a press release, Avex stated it "hopes the expanded partnership will help it to break more of [our] Japanese artists globally" while also bringing S10 and Roc Nation acts to Japan. Later in May 2024, Avex USA and S10 Music Publishing struck a publishing deal with Kavi, who co-produced "Million Dollar Baby".

=== 2025–present: Acquirement of S10, relaunch as Avex Music Group ===
On March 25, 2025, Avex announced a major restructure of its American operations. Consolidating Avex USA assets and staff and acquiring the publishing catalog of S10 Music Publishing, Avex named Silverstein as chief executive officer of Avex Music Group. These changes took effect on April 1, 2025. In October 2025, Avex Music Group named Zeke Silvera senior vice president and head of A&R.

On March 17, 2026, Bruno Mars signed a global publishing deal with Avex Music Group. In October 2026, Avex increased its stake in S10 Entertainment, acquiring 85% of the company from Silverstein. Avex additionally revealed an agreement for it to fully acquire S10 within the next few years.

== Labels ==
- Selene

== Artists ==
Avex Music Group Publishing

- Grant Boutin
- Elkan
- Elyas
- Harv
- Jasper Harris
- Kavi
- Bruno Mars
- Kamal Wilson

== See also ==
- Category:Avex Group
- Category:Record labels owned by Avex Group
