= Sound Drop MTV Unplugged+Acoustic Live 2005 =

Live album by Hitomi Yaida
- Released: 7 December 2005
- Genre: J-pop
- Label: Aozora (ZZCD-80017/B)

Hitomi Yaida chronology
Yaiko's Selection (2004)	Sound Drop MTV Unplugged+Acoustic Live 2005 (2005)

Sound Drop MTV Unplugged+Acoustic Live 2005 is a live album by Hitomi Yaida. Released in 2005, it peaked at No. 29 on the Japanese albums chart.

== CD track listing (MTV Unplugged) ==
#	Title	Romanization/Translation
1	キャンドル	Candle
2	I Really Want to Understand You	
3	How?	
4	マーブル色の日	Marble-iro no Hi
5	Fast Car	
6	ねえ	Ne
7	My Sweet Darlin'	
8	ビルを見下ろす屋上で	Biru wo Miorosu Okujo de

== DVD track listing (Acoustic Live 2005) ==
#	Title	Romanization/Translation
1	モノクロレター	Monochrome Letter
2	Not Still Over	
3	手と涙	Te to Namida
4	Life's Like a Love Song	
