= Darling Darling (song) =

Single by Yaiko (Hitomi Yaida)

from the album U.K. Completion
- Released: January 1, 2001
- Genre: J-pop
- Label: F2 Records (F2V2013)/(F2CD2013)
- Songwriter(s): Yaiko, J. Bailey, Mike F
- Producer(s): Yaiko, Mondo Paradiso, Twisted Beans

Yaiko (Hitomi Yaida) singles chronology
"My Sweet Darlin" (2000)	"Darling Darling" (2001)	"I'm Here Saying Nothing" (2001)

"Darling Darling" is the second single released by Hitomi Yaida in the UK. It was released on the independent label F2Records. It is an English remixed version of the single My Sweet Darlin' and reached number one on the UK Club Play chart.

A collection of UK released singles was released in 2002 as U.K. Completion.

== Track listing ==
=== CD ===
All tracks are written by Yaiko, J. Bailey and Mike F

CD
No.	Title	Producer(s)	Length
1.	"Darling Darling" (Mondo Paradiso Radio Edit)	Mondo Paradiso
2.	"Darling Darling" (Fuel Mix by Ils)	Ils
3.	"Darling Darling" (Soleil Mix by Kevin Beber)	Kevin Beber
4.	"Darling Darling" (Original Version)

=== 12" Vinyl ===
All tracks are written by Yaiko, J. Bailey and Mike F

Side-A
No.	Title	Producer(s)	Length
1.	"Darling Darling" (Fuel Mix by Ils)	Ils

Side-B
No.	Title	Producer(s)	Length
2.	"Darling Darling" (Soleil Mix by Kevin Beber)	Kevin Beber
3.	"Darling Darling" (Mondo Paradiso Mix)	Mondo Paradiso
