= Look Back Again/Over the Distance =

Single by Hitomi Yaida

from the album Candlize
- Released: July 27, 2001
- Genre: J-pop
- Length: 10:05
- Label: Toshiba EMI (TOCT-22153)
- Songwriter(s): Yaiko
- Producer(s): Diamond Head

Hitomi Yaida singles chronology
"'I'm Here Saying Nothing'" (2001)	"Look Back Again/Over the Distance" (2001)	"'Buzzstyle'" (2001)

"Look Back Again"/"Over the Distance" is a song by Hitomi Yaida, released as a double A-side single. It was the second single taken from the album Candlize.

"Look Back Again" reached 5th place in the charts with "Over the Distance" not performing as well and reaching 13th position.

"Over the Distance" was featured in the Nintendo DS Rhythm game Osu! Tatakae! Ouendan, as one of the most subdued songs in the game due to its use of soft bells and chimes replacing the high-pitched whistling used for most of the game's songs. The stage involves helping a recently deceased young man deliver a final message to his lover.

== Track listing ==
All lyrics are written by Yaiko except #3. All songs arranged by Diamond Head

CD
No.	Title	Music	Length
1.	"Look Back Again"	Yaiko	3:30
2.	"Over the Distance"	Yaiko	4:09
3.	"le vent brulant" (Diamond Head featuring Hitomi Yaida)	Daishi Kataoka, Akira Murata	2:18
Total length:			10:05
