= Future Kings of Spain =

Irish rock band

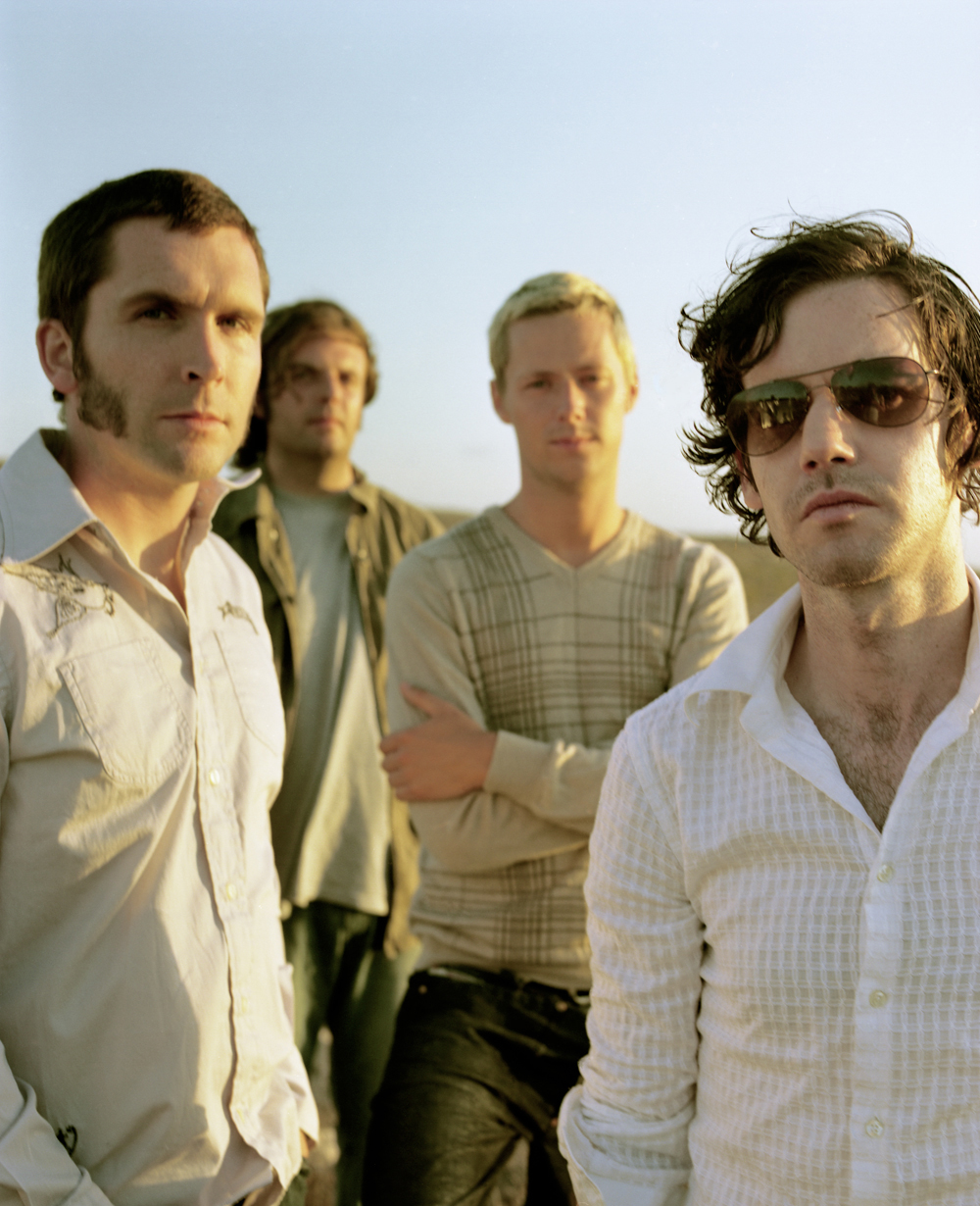
- Left to right: Bryan McMahon, Anton Hegarty, Karl Hussey, Joey Wilson

Background information
- Origin: Dublin, Ireland
- Genres: Rock Alternative
- Years active: 2000–2009 (Hiatus)
- Labels: Red Flag Records; GMT Records; What's The Kim? Recordings
- Past members: Joey Wilson; Bryan McMahon; Anton Hegarty; Karl Hussey

Future Kings of Spain were an Irish rock band formed in Dublin 2000 by Joey Wilson, Anton Hegarty and Bryan McMahon. The three had played together with ex-Spudgun guitarist Dave Layde in Mediumwave between 1996 and 1999. The band released two studio LPs Future Kings of Spain (2003) and Nervousystem (2007) and one EP Les Debemos (2004). In September 2009 after a period of inactivity, a number of music media outlets reported on the statement on the band's website announcing how the band had "brought things to a close", though not giving a reason for this apparent break-up.

== History ==
The band was initially formed in 2000. The idea to call the band Future Kings of Spain came about when Wilson, "was reading two unrelated articles at once and lined up the words Future Kings on one side and of Spain on the other."

In 2004 the band scooped Best New Band at the Meteor Music Awards, After signing with Japanese label GMT Records the band performed to 27,800 people at SONICMANIA 2004 in Osaka and Tokyo. They also toured and performed with many international acts including Biffy Clyro, Muse, Idlewild and The Strokes. "Hanging Around" featured in the opening titles of the 2005 'zombie comedy' Boy Eats Girl. At the 2008 Meteor Music Awards, the band were the most nominated act, nominated in 3 categories - Best Irish Band, Best Irish Album and Best Live Act. On this occasion the band would come away empty-handed. The band continued to perform into 2008, though not as often as in previous years. During this time Anton married longtime girlfriend Alison Curtis. One of the band's final performances was at Oxegen 2008.

In 2009 the band broke up with no reason given. Golden Plec wrote how it was "one of the great mysteries from the Irish music scene in the early noughties how Future Kings of Spain failed to turn one of the best Irish rock records of the decade into chart success". On 4 September 2009, the State.ie website described how the band left a short history of themselves in a blog entitled 'Future Kings of Spain 2000-2009' saying that they had in fact disbanded in June 2009.

In September 2015, some years after the band's dissolution, Golden Plec reappraised the self-titled by debut Future Kings of Spain and described it as "a classic".

== Personnel ==
- Joey Wilson - Vocals/Guitar
- Anton Hegarty - Bass
- Karl Hussey - Guitar
- Bryan McMahon - Drums

== Discography ==
=== Future Kings of Spain (2003) ===
The band's self-titled debut album was released on 4 August 2003 on CD & limited edition 12" vinyl. It was produced by Ted Niceley and recorded at Stratosphere Sound in New York City. Eli Janney from Girls Against Boys mixed the album, with Geoff Sanoff from Washington DC band Edsel engineering throughout. It was released through UK label Red Flag Records and Japanese label GMT Records and included the singles and live anthems "Venetian Blinds", "Hanging Around" and "Face I Know" (debuting at #9 in the UK's Rock Charts).

"A Place For Everything" (2003)
from the 2003 album "Future Kings of Spain"

1. A Place For Everything
2. Your Starlight
3. Venetian Blinds
4. Hanging Around
5. One Look
6. Simple Fact
7. Meanest Sound
8. So Wrong
9. Face I Know
10. Traps
11. Upside Down

"Venetian Blinds" (2003)
from the 2003 album "Future Kings of Spain"

=== Les Debemos EP (2004) ===
Released in July 2004, this EP was recorded by Lenny Frankie at Jacobs Studio in Surrey and mixed by Darren Allison (Spiritualized).

1. Venetian Blinds
2. 1981
3. We Owe You

=== Nervousystem (2007) ===
The album Nervousystem was released on 28 September 2007, on CD and Download / MP3, on the band's own label, What's The Kim? Recordings. It was produced by Ian Grimble (Manic Street Preachers, The Fall), mixed by long-term friend, artist and producer Joe Chester and recorded at 2 kHz, London & Temple Studios in Malta. Although it was recorded late in 2005, the album achieves a timeless quality. In an interview with the Irish Independent Wilson said "We didn't want to sound fashionable, like the bands who were coming out at that time," says Joe. "You had Bloc Party, Kaiser Chiefs and Futureheads - bands that were sounding post-punk. We're not reinventing the wheel. We're just trying to write good songs."

"Guess Again", the first single, was released on 4 May, and was chosen by public vote on Phantom 105.2 The second single, "Kick in the Teeth", was released on 27 July. The third single from the album "This is the End" was chosen as the song of the week on The Ian Dempsey Show on Today FM and was number seven in the Irish airplay charts.

1. Guess Again
2. One More Mistake
3. This Is The End
4. Lost And Found
5. Syndicate
6. Kick in the Teeth
7. You Dream in Solid Gold
8. 1981
9. Chemical Burn
10. This Song
11. Disappear

Favourable reviews of Nervousystem were published by RTÉ, the Irish Times and other outlets. A review on the CLUAS website stated that: "...given the headaches involved in ensuring its release, this could have been the Future Kings of Spain’s Smile. Instead, it may well be their Pet Sounds".

== Style and reception ==
Reviews of Future Kings of Spain

- "Future Kings of Spain may have a big thank you to say to J Mascis, Ian MacKaye and Rivers Cuomo - but that could be dwarfed by the one you'll have for them after hearing this." 4 out of 5 RTÉ
- "All the nu-punk and nu-metal pretenders will shrink before the power and majesty of The Future Kings of Spain." Cool Noise
- "Plenty of ear candy here. 'Venetian Blinds' has the grin-inducing melody of Weezer and The Rentals, whilst 'Your Starlight' is the straight-ahead kinda classic-sounding rock tune Serafin should really be writing." Drowned in Sound
- "I can't help the feeling that they will soon find themselves in America and be lost to these shores for ever. All the nu-punk and nu-metal pretenders will shrink before the power and majesty of The Future Kings of Spain." Cool Noise
- "Future Kings of Spain’s songs are so strong, and this on debut, that I’d much rather hear one of their album throwaways. Name five other new bands right now, off the top of your head, who you can say the same for?" Faster Louder Australia

== Other projects ==
Hussey and McMahon are currently playing with Dan Barry (ex-Bambi) in Badself. The band recorded their debut album with producer Ronan McHugh at the home studio of Def Leppard's Joe Elliott. Entitled 'The Three Daughters of Mara', it was released in 2014. Hegarty continues to play in A Lazarus Soul and Tin Charm, whilst providing session bass for Danielle Harrison.
