= Single Collection/Yaiko's Selection =

Single Collection/Yaiko's Selection Box Set

Compilation album by Hitomi Yaida
- Released: 28 July 2004
- Genre: J-pop
- Label: Toshiba EMI (TOCT-25410)

Hitomi Yaida chronology
Single Collection/Yaiko's Selection Box Set (2004)	Single Collection (2004)

Single Collection/Yaiko's Selection is a CD/DVD Box Set release by Hitomi Yaida. It contains the albums Single Collection and Yaiko's Selection with an accompanying DVD. The DVD includes copies of her PV's and also a Yaiko Music History. Released in 2004, it peaked at No. 3 on the Japanese albums chart.
