= Satomi (singer, born 1989) =

Japanese pop singer (born 1989)

SATOMI' サトミ
- Also known as: Satton; Satomi; SATOMI'; SATOMi
- Born: March 7, 1989 (age 37); Ube, Yamaguchi, Japan
- Genres: J-pop; Rhythm and blues hip hop
- Occupation: Singer-songwriter
- Years active: 2005–present
- Labels: Aozora Records (Japan); Hiptones (United Kingdom)
- Website: Official website

Satomi Misumi (三隅 理美, Misumi Satomi; born March 7, 1989) is a Japanese pop singer. She also goes under the names Satomi and Satton. In 2003, she began vocal and dance lessons simultaneously. She had her first live performance at 15 at the MIDEM 2005 International Music Conference where she was discovered by a sports magazine. She debuted in the United Kingdom in 2005 with the song "love shouts" under the hiptones label as the label's first featured artist.

On October 24, 2006, Satomi released "Heartbreaker" single in the UK with simultaneous releases in the UK and Japan iTunes stores. The single reached the Top 10 in the R&B and comprehensive charts. She debuted in Japan with the double A-side single "Yesterday/Love to stay" on February 8, 2006. Currently, she is under the Aozora Records Label in Japan.

== Discography ==
=== Original studio albums ===
- 2007-02-07 Diamondlily
- 2008-03-26 Angelite
- 2008-10-29 Daisylight (iTunes Digital Releases)
- 2009-05-20 The Best (Japanese First BEST album)
- 2010-04-28 Blacrystal (Japanese Special album)

=== Japanese singles ===
- 2006-02-08 Yesterday / Love to stay
- 2006-08-02 Candy magic
- 2006-11-08 Orange canvas ~秋の空のしたで~ / Fairy's stick (Aki no Sora no Shita de; Under the Autumn Sky) #81 1,277
- 2007-07-11 Baby Doll
- 2007-09-21 Baby Doll -DJ KAZ ambivalence mix- (12-inch Vinyl)
- 2007-11-21 Darlin'×2 feat. COMA-CHI
- 2008-03-05 Bright Will

=== Mini-albums ===
- 2007-12-05 SINGS ~Winter, and Luv~

=== UK singles (as Satomi) ===
- 2005-02-14 love shouts
- 2005-06-20 Toxic Love (Pre-debut Vinyl)
- 2005-10-24 HEARTBREAKER
- 2006-02-08 Love to Stay (Limited Edition)
- 2006-03-13 Oh! (feat. Doc Brown)

=== Digital Japanese releases ===
- 2007-02-07 No. 1
- 2007-02-07 Time
- 2007-03-07 Spring
- 2007-04-11 Crystal Drops -Long Version-
- 2007-05-30 Time -Lord Finesse & Davel "Bo" McKenzie remix-
- 2007-10-24 Beautiful Life
- 2007-12-26 Fly magic boy
- 2008-01-30 Innumerable answers
- 2008-02-20 KISS feat. OKI
- 2008-03-19 Drive feat. SHIZOO -Ready version-
- 2008-07-02 Darlin'×2 feat. Chris (DJ Kenkaida R&B House Remix) Remixed by DJ Kenkaida
- 2008-08-20 One Day
- 2008-08-27 Memory -夏色の宝物- (Natsu-iro no Takaramono; Treasured Summer Colors)
- 2008-10-01 Show ur love
- 2008-10-08 Present feat. KEN THE 390
- 2008-11-26 Joy of Love -SEXY-SYNTHESIZER REMIX-
- 2009-02-04 Miss U
- 2009-03-04 Love U
- 2009-04-01 Precious days -With U-
- 2009-05-06 All for U
- 2009-05-06 Love Strings (Miss U, Love U, Precious days -With U-, All for U)

=== Collaborations and compilations ===
- 2008-08-26「EMOTION ～ "J" R&B Greatest Hits」
  - 02. Yesterday
  - 08. Candy
- 2009-09-16 Kotodama feat. Dohzi-T & SATOMI' / DJ YUTAKA
- 2009-10-07 ありがとう さよなら feat. SATOMI' (Arigatou Sayonara; Thank you, Goodbye) / CLENCH & BLISTAH
- 2009-12-23 Time and You (Digital Single) / AILI thanx to SATOMI'
