= GMT Records =

- Parent company: Aozora Records
- Founded: 2004

Image:Gmt records logo.png|frame|right]] GMT Records is an imprint or sub-label of Aozora Records. Created in 2004, it focuses on the Japanese representation and promotion of English and Irish indie groups.

The first band signings were The Future Kings of Spain and The Veils. As the distribution of these bands albums were handled under Aozora's contract with Toshiba-EMI, they were transferred to the new deal with Avex Marketing Communications taken out in 2005.

== See also ==
- List of record labels
- Aozora Records
