= Maki Yano =

Yano Maki
- Origin: Tokyo, Japan
- Genres: rock, jazz, pop, folk
- Years active: 1999–present
- Labels: Universal Music; King Records

Maki Yano (矢野 真紀, Yano Maki) (born 29 April 1977) is a J-pop singer who debuted in July 1999 with her single "Early Summer Happenings" (初夏の出来事, Shoka no dekigoto).

She is a Japanese acoustic pop artist and former rock singer. Her genre varies from rock, jazz, pop, and folk.

== Albums ==
List of albums
Album Title	Release Date	Album songs
Shiawase na yoru, hakanai jikan	Released: December 8, 1999	01. tooi kodama; 02. sora ni sumu hito; 03. hidamari; 04. shiawase na yoru hakanai jikan; 05. yasashii koe no nukumori; 06. sora tobu kujira; 07. hikari no takara; 08. shoka no dekigoto; 09. chiisai koto dakedo; 10. ai yori tooku; 11. kansha no shirushi
Soba no Kasu	Released: February 9, 2001	01. Oasis; 02. mayonaka no kokudou; 03. otenki; 04. ookina tsubasa; 05. uzu; 06. Time Capsule no oka; 07. NEJI to ai; 08. aozora ni ukabu wa shiroi tsuki; 09. yume wo mite ita kingyo; 10. kimi no tame ni dekiru koto; 11. ashita (MAKIGAME ver.)
Mahou	Released: November 7, 2001	01.魔法; 02.オネスティ; 03.海辺の避暑地に
Takaramono	Released: December 27, 2001	01. namae; 02. mahou; 03. ashburn (ENG); 04. taiyou; 05. kimi no tame ni dekiru koto -live ver-; 06. ookina tsubasa -live ver.-; 07. otenki -live ver.-
Kono Sekai ni Ikite	Released: November 27, 2002	01. kono senaka ni ikite; 02. 1-SENCHI no yoake; 03. sayonara iro wa blue; 04. shougo no gisasen; 05. itsuka boku ga kaeru basho; 06. umai hebi tsukai; 07. shinikaketa ashi; 08. hitotsu dake; 09. PAYAPPA; 10. minna ni uta; 11. otona to kodomo
Aiiro	Released: March 26, 2003	01. boku no sora; 02. komoriuta; 03. gyutto shite; 04. kemuri no you ni; 05. sentakumono
Yakyoku	Released: November 27, 2003	01.夜曲; 02.雨のステイション
Haruka	Released: March 10, 2004	01. amish no mori; 02. chijou no hikari; 03. OREJI-; 04. Tokyo Tower; 05. yakyoku (ENG); 06. uchi ni oide; 07. aru hi; 08. senaka; 09. hakubo no machi; 10. mitsu; 11. hatsukoi no kita michi
Yakyaoku	Released: March 31, 2004	01.夜曲; 02.夜曲(オリジナル・カラオケ); 03.夜曲(ライブ)
Ii Kaze	Released: May 25, 2005	01. hibi no sukima; 02. kirakira utsushite; 03. mada tarinai; 04. michi; 05. Bye Bye Bye; 06. yoru no you ni; 07. mou hitori wa kaze; 08. daisuki datta n' da yo; 09. samidare; 10. tooi sekai ni
Yanomaki	Released: November 23, 2005	01.大きな翼; 02.夢を見ていた金魚; 03.オアシス; 04.いつか僕が還る場所; 05.さよなら色はブルー; 06.ボクの空; 07. 夜曲; 08.このまま・・・
Birth	Released: April 29, 2007	01.パパ; 02.COLOR; 03.返信; 04.アイサレ; 05.Good Time; 06.窓
Namidauta -Maki Yano Nakeru Live Best-	Released: March 11, 2009	01.夜曲; 02.東京タワー; 03.ボクの空; 04.パパ; 05.ふるさと; 06.タイムカプセルの丘; 07.WHEN YOU WISH UPON A STAR 〜星に願いを〜; 08.君の為に出来る事; 09.青空に浮かぶは白い月; 10.窓; 11.ケサラ
Honne Toha Ai Yo	Released: June 10, 2009	01.本音とは愛よ; 02.プロポーズ; 03.情熱の記憶; 04.ユートピア; 05.のろいのように; 06.傘もささずに; 07.青い鳥のストーリー; 08.メッセージ
