= Single Collection (Hitomi Yaida album) =

Compilation album by Hitomi Yaida
- Released: 28 July 2004
- Genre: J-pop
- Label: Toshiba EMI (TOCT-25412)

Hitomi Yaida chronology
Single Collection/Yaiko's Selection (2004)	Single Collection (2004)	Yaiko's Selection (2004)

Single Collection is the first Greatest Hits-esque release by Hitomi Yaida, giving a selection of her singles released up to the time of issue. It was also issued as part of the Single collection/Yaiko's selection Box Set. Released in 2004, it peaked at No. 3 on the Japanese albums chart.

== Track listing ==
#	Title	Romanization/Translation
01	How?	
02	B'coz I Love You	
03	My Sweet Darlin'	
04	I'm here saying nothing	
05	Look Back Again	
06	Over The Distance	
07	Buzzstyle	
08	Ring my bell	
09	アンダンテ	ANDANTE
10	未完成のメロディ	Mikansei no Melody
11	孤独なカウボーイ	kodoku na Cowboy
12	一人ジェンガ	Hitori Jenga
