= Daiya-monde =

Studio album by Hitomi Yaida
- Released: 25 October 2000
- Genre: J-pop, Rock music
- Length: 37:41
- Label: Toshiba EMI (TOCT-24455)
- Producer: Diamond Head & Hitomi Yaida

Hitomi Yaida chronology
Daiya-monde (2000)	Candlize (2001)

Professional ratings
Review scores
Source	Rating
J-fan	5/5 stars

Daiya-monde is the first album by Hitomi Yaida released on 25 October 2000. The singles from this album were "B'coz I Love You" and "My Sweet Darlin'". The album also contains the mix version of "How?" & "I like" released from the indie record label only in the Kansai area.

The album title is a word coined by Yaida. "Daiya" reads "Yaida" in reversed order in Japanese, and "monde" means "the world" in French. That is, the title shows "Yaiko World". Moreover, it is an equivoque with "Diamond" of Diamond Head which produces her.

== Track listing ==
All lyrics are written by Yaiko, all music composed by Yaiko except noted, all songs arranged by Diamond Head

No.	Title	Music	Length
1.	"How? (UK mix)"
2.	"Everything Is in Our Mind"
3.	"B'coz I Love You"
4.	"Your Kiss"
5.	"My Sweet Darlin'"
6.	"Girl's Talk"
7.	"Moshimo no Uta (もしものうた)"
8.	"Ne-e (ねえ)"
9.	"Ōsaka Jennu (大阪ジェンヌ)" (instrumental)	Daishi Kataoka
10.	"I Like (UK mix)"
11.	"Nothing"
