= Hitomi Yaida =

Japanese musician

Hitomi Yaida 矢井田 瞳
- Also known as: Yaiko
- Born: July 28, 1978 (age 47); Toyonaka, Osaka, Japan
- Genres: Japanese pop, folk rock
- Years active: 1999–present
- Labels: Bandai Music Entertainment (1999); Aozora Records (2000–2009); Reservotion Records (2000–2005); Universal Music Japan (2010–present)
- Website: yaiko.jp

Hitomi Yaida 矢井田瞳 (Yaida Hitomi, born July 28, 1978) is a Japanese pop/folk rock singer-songwriter and guitarist. She often goes by the nickname Yaiko. Yaida is an established musical artist in Japan and has also had minor club hits in the United Kingdom.

== Career ==
=== 2000 ===
Born in Toyonaka, Osaka, Yaida first became well known when her first single ("Howling" which included the track "How?") was released in 2000 on Aozora Records, an independent label pre-dominantly distributing to the Kansai area of Osaka only, and reportedly sold in excess of 10,000 copies. Widespread airplay on Osaka's local radio stations and word-of-mouth resulted in both Yaida and Aozora Records becoming the focus of a bidding war between the larger record companies for both recording and distribution contracts, the final Japanese distributing rights being sold to Toshiba-EMI with Aozora retaining artist control and independent label status.

"B'coz I Love You" was the first single released under contract, entering the Japanese charts at number 16 in July. Through the association with Toshiba-EMI, live appearances in the UK (both London and Manchester) followed in September. This initial British exposure culminated in the release of the UK Single "I Like 2" under her nickname Yaiko on F2Records, which created the impetus for a UK fan-base to grow. Her second Toshiba-EMI single, "My Sweet Darlin'", released in October entered the charts at number 9 quickly followed by her first album (daiya-monde) which went straight to Number 1 in the Oricon album charts.

During this time she was still attending Kansai University, reading French language and literature. Yaida took a short sabbatical from her musical career to prepare her thesis for submission in the latter part of the year.

=== 2001 ===
The second UK Single, "Darling Darling", was released on January 1, 2000, at a special live appearance in London. Building on the success of "I Like 2", this release again featured remixes of her Japanese tracks with English lyrics to appeal to the UK club market.

Between the period January 15 – February 20 she was hospitalised because of exhaustion. During which, "I'm Here Saying Nothing" was released in Japan (entering at number 4) and "Darling Darling" reached number 1 in the UK club chart.

She graduated from Kansai University with a degree in French language and literature on March 19, starting her first official Japanese tour on the 21st (the seven date 'I'm Here...' tour) followed immediately by live appearances in Liverpool, Manchester, Aberdeen, Glasgow and London.

On return from the UK, The First Reflection DVD was released (April 25) along with her first book release saikinnoyaiko (April 27). This was then followed by 9 additional dates for the 'I'm Here...' tour of Japan. Her 4th single, the double A side "Look Back Again/Over the Distance" was released on June 27 entering the charts at number 3.

August saw the 'Hitomi Yaida Summer Festival Sound of Clover' tour (4 dates) and an appearance at the London Astoria. The 5th single, "Buzzstyle", was released in September followed by live acoustic dates in October.

Candlize, the 2nd album, was released in Japan on October 31. It entered the charts at number 1 and achieved enough sales to be certified Platinum. The 'Hitomi Yaida Candleyes' tour, to promote this release, saw her playing 11 dates during November and December – during which her first live performance DVD/VHS was released (Hitomi Yaida 2001 Summer Live Sound of Clover).

Yaida finished 2001 in the Osaka Dome with her first Countdown performance – 'Countdown Live 2001–2002'. The Countdown events, held on December 31, are live concerts that culminate in the traditional countdown of the seconds to midnight and the beginning of the new year.

=== 2002 ===
14 more dates for the 'Hitomi Yaida Candleyes' were scheduled from January to March, finishing with two dates at the Osaka Festival Hall. The 6th single, "Ring My Bell", was released on March 27, followed in July with the tour DVD's Candle in the Eyes, Candle in the Lives (video tour diary) and the DVD Box set Casket of Candleyes (all released July 3). The 7th single, "Andante", followed on July 10 with the Music Pool 2002 concert recording taking place on July 27 in Osaka.

September saw her embark on the 8-date 'Acoustic Live 2002' tour promoting the upcoming release of her 3rd album, I/flancy, which was released on October 9 and entered the charts at number 1, with the single release "Mikansei no Melody" following on December 4. She finished 2002 with the live concerts 'Tokyo/flancy Night: Ring Your Hell 12–25' on December 25 in the Tokyo Dome and also 'Osaka/flancy Midnight: Countdown Live 2002–2003' at the Osaka Dome on December 31 (her second consecutive Countdown event).

=== 2003 ===
The 'I/can fly Tour2003' from February to June saw her playing 36 events, again ending at the Osaka festival hall. During touring – the live CD/DVD Music Pool 2002, her 2nd PV collection Sparkles of light and her 8th single "Koduku na Cowboy" were all released. The 9th single "Hitori Jenga" was released on September 10, just prior to a five night 'acoustic Live~2003~' tour. 2003 ended with various live concerts and radio sessions to promote the release of her 4th album Air/Cook/Sky on October 29.

=== 2004 ===
February saw the beginning of the 'Yaiko/Rocks 50Rounds' tour, a 50 night tour of Japan that would not finish until June, part of which was filmed by Fuji Television for pay-per-view audiences. The double A-side single "Chapter01/Marble-iro no Hi" was released in March and a final (51st) date was added in Sapporo under the heading of 'Yaiko/Rocks BonusRound' on June 26. The Single Collection/Yaiko's Selection Box Set was released on June 28 (her birthday) as a limited edition, with the Single Collection also being released separately. 'Summer Festival Girls Talk 2004' took place in August with 3 dates including Yokohama and Osaka, with the 11th single "Monochrome Letter" being released on October 27.

Yaiko's Selection (a collection of her personal favourite tracks previously only available as part of the limited edition Single Collection/Yaiko's Selection Box Set) was released on December 1 due to fan demands. This was followed with 2 live dates in the Osaka and Tokyo domes under the title 'Dome Live2004 Music in the Air'. 2004 was completed with her 3rd Countdown event 'Countdown Live 2004–2005' in Nagoya.

=== 2005 ===
The live DVD Hitomi Yaida Music in the Air: Dome Live 2004 was released on February 16. Following which, Yaida entered recording studios in London and Grouse Lodge in Ireland for her 5th album.

She became the third Japanese artist to record an MTV Unplugged episode on April 24, recorded in the Tokyo FM Hall, after which she embarked on the 15-date 'acoustic live 2005' tour. The 12th single, "Mawaru Sora", was released on July 6 and also appeared in the localised release of the motion picture Robots.

A summer of festival appearances helped to promote the release of her 5th album Here Today – Gone Tomorrow which was released on August 15. December 7 saw the simultaneous release of the Hitomi Yaida MTV Unplugged DVD and the Sound Drop MTV Unplugged+Acoustic Live 2005 CD/DVD. 2005 was completed with a four-night 'Here-Today Live 2005' tour which included two performances at the Nippon Budokan.

=== 2006 ===
2006 was marked by the preparation for the release of Yaida's sixth studio album. Three singles, ("Go My Way", "Startline" and "Hatsukoi") were released in March, June, and November respectively prior to the album's release on November 22. The album was titled It's a New Day and was further promoted by the availability of the album track "御堂筋Planet" as an internet download on the same day. To support this release, the 23-date 'Tour 2007 "It's a New Live"' tour was announced at the end of October. This tour extended from March 9, 2007, through the end of April.

=== 2007 ===
She went on a two-month tour "Hitomi Yaida Tour 2007 It's A New Live" from March to April.

On July 28, she announced that she had married the man who was one year older than she was on her official website.

=== 2008 ===
On March 5, she released her new album "colorhythm" after an interval of 1 year and 4 months.

She went on a two-month tour "My tear Bidō presents Hitomi Yaida Colorock Live 2008" from March to April.

=== 2009 ===
On February 18, she released her greatest hits album "The Best of Hitomi Yaida" and a collection of music videos "Hitomi Yaida Music Video Collection" to celebrate her tenth anniversary of her debut.

She announced that she became pregnant on June 1, and gave birth to a baby girl on October 28.

=== 2010 ===
On July 28, she announced a change of talent agency: from Clear Sky Corporation to Yamaha. On December 1, she signed with a new record label Universal Sigma.

== Discography ==
=== Studio albums ===
- Daiya-monde (October 25, 2000), anagram of "Yaida" combined with the French word for "world", and a reference to the word "diamond"
- Candlize (October 31, 2001), "Candle eyes"
- I/flancy (October 9, 2002), anagram of "I can fly"
- Air/Cook/Sky (October 29, 2003), anagram of "Yaiko's rock"
- Here Today – Gone Tomorrow (August 15, 2005)
- It's a New Day (November 22, 2006)
- Colorhythm (March 5, 2008)
- Vivid Moments (May 19, 2011)
- panodrama (September 22, 2012)
- Time Clip (March 2, 2016)
- Sharing (December 11, 2020)
- Alright (September 7, 2022)

=== Singles ===
- "Howling" (May 3, 2000)
- "B'coz I Love You" (July 14, 2000)
- "I Like 2" (September 22, 2000)
- "My Sweet Darlin'" (October 4, 2000)
- "Darling Darling" (January 1, 2001)
- "I'm Here Saying Nothing" (January 24, 2001)
- "Look Back Again/Over the Distance" (July 27, 2001)
- "Buzzstyle" (September 27, 2001)
- "Ring My Bell" (March 27, 2002)
- "Andante (アンダンテ, Andante)" (July 10, 2002)
- "Mikansei no Melody (未完成のメロディ, Unfinished Melody)" (December 4, 2002)
- "Koduku na Cowboy (孤独なカウボーイ, Lonely Cowboy)" (April 23, 2003)
- "Hitori Jenga (一人ジェンガ, Single Person Jenga)" (September 10, 2003)
- "Chapter01/Marble-iro no Hi (Chapter01/マーブル色の日, Chapter01/Marble-colored Day)" (March 17, 2004)
- "Monochrome Letter (モノクロレター, Monochrome Letter)" (October 27, 2004)
- "Mawaru Sora (マワルソラ, Spinning Sky)" (July 6, 2005)
- "Go My Way" (March 15, 2006)
- "Startline" (June 21, 2006)
- "Hatsukoi (初恋, First Love)" (November 1, 2006)
- "I Love You no katachi/haneyume (I Love Youの形/ハネユメ)" (October 10, 2007)
- "Simple is Best" (February 9, 2011)
- "Dojo Mitaina Love (同情みたいなLOVE)" (April 20, 2011)
- "Mogitate no Yūutsu (もぎたての憂鬱)" (July 11, 2012)

=== Compilations ===
- U.K. Completion (January 23, 2002)
- Music Pool 2002 CD & DVD (February 19, 2003)
- Single Collection/Yaiko's Selection Box Set (July 28, 2004)
- Single collection (July 28, 2004)
- Yaiko's Selection (December 1, 2004)
- Sound Drop MTV Unplugged+Acoustic Live 2005 CD & DVD (December 7, 2005)
- Hitomi Yaida Colorock Live 2008 iTunes Store (June 25, 2008)
- The Best of Hitomi Yaida (February 18, 2009)

=== DVD and video ===
- The First Reflection VHS/DVD (April 25, 2001)
- Hitomi Yaida 2001 Summer Live Sound of Clover VHS/DVD (November 28, 2001)
- Candle in the Lives VHS/DVD (July 3, 2002)
- Candle in the Eyes VHS/DVD (July 3, 2002)
- Casket of Candleyes DVD (July 3, 2002)
- Sparkles of light DVD/VHS (March 29, 2003)
- Live Completion '03: I Can Fly, Can You? DVD (January 28, 2004)
- Hitomi Yaida Music in the Air: Dome Live 2004 DVD (February 16, 2005)
- Hitomi Yaida MTV Unplugged DVD (December 7, 2005)
- Hitomi Yaida Colorock Live 2008 DVD (June 25, 2008)
- Hitomi Yaida Music Video Collection DVD (February 18, 2009)

==== Other ====
- The Japan Gold Disc Award 2004 Various Artists ("kodoku na Cowboy") (April 14, 2004)
- Grand Prix – Super Collection 2004 Various Artists ("le Vent brulant") (September 23, 2004)
- FM802 Heavy Rotations J-hits Complete '99–'01 Various Artists ("How?") (December 12, 2004)
- Venus Japan Various Artists "(Chapter01)" (March 30, 2005)
- Robots Original Motion Picture Soundtrack Various Artists ("Mawaru Sora") (July 27, 2005)
- Death Note Tribute Various Artists ("37.0 °C") (June 23, 2006)

== Commercial use of music in the media ==
Yaida sang a cover version of "You Are My Sunshine" on a commercial for the Kirin Brewery Company.

== Personal life ==
On July 28, 2007, Yaida married a man one year older than herself. The only information released regarding her new husband is that he works for a music company and they were introduced by a friend.
