= Corporate resolution =

A corporate resolution or written resolution is a document issued by a board of directors, outlining a binding corporate action.

Resolutions may authorize routine transactions such as opening corporate bank accounts, or adopting a fictitious business name. Others may be used to delegate, approve, or rescind decision-making authority to individuals to act on behalf of the corporation.

This form of corporate resolution is also required by title agencies when selling corporate-owned real estate. The form and structure of this document varies depending on the state in which the corporation is organized.

For a corporate action, if allowed by state law and by the bylaws of the corporation, the board of directors may use a written document to waive formal notice of a meeting and unanimously consent to a resolution.

In the United Kingdom, the Companies Act 2006 made provision allowing for written resolutions to be signed by a majority of a company's shareholders, replacing the previous requirement that all shareholders' signatures were required.

Resolutions are not required on Trust or Estate accounts: see Trust law.
