= Here Today – Gone Tomorrow =

Studio album by Hitomi Yaida
- Released: 15 August 2005
- Genre: J-pop
- Label: Toshiba EMI (TOCT-25815)

Hitomi Yaida chronology
Air/Cook/Sky (2003)	Here Today – Gone Tomorrow (2005)	It's a New Day (2006)

Here Today – Gone Tomorrow is the fifth album by Hitomi Yaida released on 15 August 2005. The singles from this album were "Monochrome Letter" and "Mawaru Sora" .

== Track listing ==
All lyrics are written by Hitomi Yaida.

CD
No.	Title	Music	Arranger(s)	Length
1.	"Chapter02"	Hitomi Yaida		4:22
2.	"Mawarusora (マワルソラ; Spinning Sky)"	Hitomi Yaida	Akira Murata, Hitomi Yaida	4:09
3.	"Nanairo Piero (七色ピエロ; Coloured Clown)"	Hitomi Yaida		3:14
4.	"Marble-iro no Hi (マーブル色の日; Marble Coloured Day)"	Hitomi Yaida	Daishi kataoka, Akira Murata, Hitomi Yaida	2:56
5.	"Tsuki wo Miteita (月を見ていた; I Was Looking at the Moon)"	Hitomi Yaida	Hitomi Yaida, Hiroshi Yamaguchi (Heatwave)	5:36
6.	"Not a Period"	Hitomi Yaida	Hiroshi Yamaguchi（HEATWAVE）・KiLA	4:00
7.	"Believe or Doubt" (Instrumental)	Akira Murata, Hitomi Yaida		2:37
8.	"Pajama Holiday"	Hitomi Yaida	Akira Murata, Hitomi Yaida	3:37
9.	"Monokuro Retā (モノクロレター; Monochrome Letter)"	Hitomi Yaida		4:55
10.	"Kanojo no Riyū (彼女の理由; Her Reason)"	Hitomi Yaida		4:18
11.	"Biru wo Miorosu Okujō de (ビルを見下ろす屋上で; On the Rooftop Overlooking the Buildings) whitfield version"	Hitomi Yaida		4:09
12.	"Ame to Uso (雨と嘘; Rain and Lies)"	Hitomi Yaida		5:20
13.	"Yura Yura (ゆらゆら; To-and-fro)"	Hitomi Yaida		3:40

== Chart positions ==
Chart (2005)	Peak position	Time in chart	Ref
Japan Oricon	3	9 weeks	
