= Aozora Records =

Japanese record company

- Parent company: Clear Sky Corporation
- Founded: May 3, 2000
- Distributor(s): Toshiba-EMI(2000-2005); Avex Group(2005-present)
- Genre: J-pop
- Country of origin: Japan
- Location: Shibuya, Tokyo
- Official website: aozorarecords.com

Aozora Records (青空, Blue Sky Records) is a Japanese record company owned by Clear Sky Corporation. It was established on May 3, 2000, to handle the independent release of Hitomi Yaida's debut maxi CD Howling in the Kansai area of Japan. It was the subject of a bidding war amongst the larger recording companies for distribution rights, which were won by Toshiba-EMI.

The distribution contract with Toshiba-EMI was cancelled in September 2005, with Avex Marketing Communications winning the new rights.

== Notable Artists ==
- Hitomi Yaida
- SATOMI'
- Imogen Heap
- Mary Lou Lord
- Daishi Kataoka (solo artist and label Producer)

== See also ==
- List of record labels
- GMT Records
