= Ringo Sheena discography =

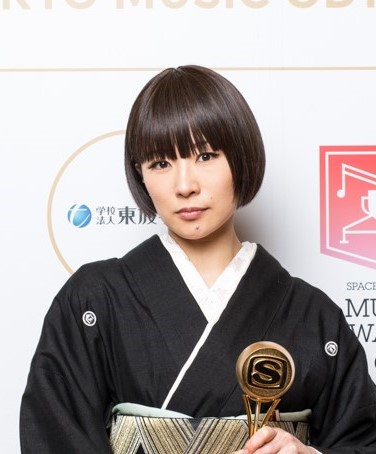
- Sheena in 2016
- Studio albums: 8
- Extended plays: 2
- Compilation albums: 6
- Singles: 35
- Cover albums: 3

The solo discography of Ringo Sheena features eight studio albums, six compilation albums, two extended plays and thirty-five singles. Signing with Toshiba-EMI in 1998, Sheena released her debut single "Kōfukuron" in May 1998, when she was 19 years old. She subsequently released the singles "Kabukichō no Joō" and "Koko de Kiss Shite", the latter becoming her first hit. As of 2014, Sheena has been signed with EMI Records following EMI Music Japan being absorbed into Universal Music Japan.

== Albums ==
=== Studio albums ===
List of studio albums, with selected chart positions
Title	Album details	Peak positions		Sales (JPN)	Certifications
Title	Album details	JPN	TWN East Asia (Note: The G-Music chart was established in July 2005 and only archives the top 20 releases.) (Note: Positions was taken as follows: Heisei Fūzoku 2007 week 9, Heisei Fūzoku Daiginjō 2007 week 18, Sanmon Gossip 2007 week 27, Watashi to Hōden 2007 week 30, "Ariamaru Tomi" 2009 week 22, Ukina 2014 week 21, Gyakuyunyū: Kōwankyoku 2014 week 37, Hi Izuru Tokoro 2014 week 45, Chuíxián Sān Chǐ, "Nagaku Mijikai Matsuri"/"Kamisama, Hotokesama".)	Sales (JPN)	Certifications
Muzai Moratorium	Released: February 24, 1999 (JPN); Label: Eastworld; Formats: CD, vinyl, digital download	2	—	1,434,000	RIAJ: Million (Note: Muzai Moratorium later received a 3× Platinum certification for 1,200,000 copies, however the 3× Platinum threshold was changed to 750,000 copies in 2003.)
Shōso Strip	Released: March 31, 2000 (JPN); Label: Virgin; Formats: CD, vinyl, digital download	1	—	2,333,000	RIAJ: 2× Million
Kalk Samen Kuri no Hana	Released: February 23, 2003 (JPN); Label: Virgin; Formats: CD, vinyl, digital download	1	—	410,000	RIAJ: 2× Platinum
Heisei Fūzoku	As Ringo Shiina & Neko Saito, soundtrack for Sakuran; Released: February 21, 2007 (JPN); Label: Virgin; Formats: CD, DVD video, (Note: Released as Heisei Fūzoku Daiginjō (平成風俗 大吟醸; "Japanese Manners Premium") with 96k/24bits sound, music videos and animations.) vinyl, digital download	1 (Note: Also charted at number 18 on DVD chart.)	— (Note: Charted at number 19 on the audiovisual chart.)	175,000	RIAJ: Gold
Sanmon Gossip	Released: June 24, 2009 (JPN); Label: Virgin; Formats: CD, digital download	1	6	202,000	RIAJ: Gold
Hi Izuru Tokoro	Released: November 5, 2014 (JPN); Label: Virgin; Formats: CD, CD+DVD, CD+Blu-ray, digital download	3	6	100,000	RIAJ: Gold
Sandokushi	Released: May 27, 2019 (JPN); Label: EMI; Formats: CD, digital download	2	1	57,538	RIAJ: Gold
Carnival	Released: May 29, 2024; Label: EMI; Formats: CD, digital download, streaming	2	—	32,515	
"—" denotes items which were released before the creation of the G-Music Chart, or items that did not chart.

=== Cover albums ===
List of cover albums, with selected chart positions
Title	Album details	Peak positions		Sales (JPN)	Certifications
Title	Album details	JPN	TWN East Asia	Sales (JPN)	Certifications
Utaite Myōri: Sono Ichi	Released: May 27, 2002 (JPN); Label: Virgin; Formats: 2-CD, digital download	1	—	397,000	RIAJ: Platinum
Gyakuyunyū: Kōwankyoku	Self-cover album; Released: May 27, 2014 (JPN); Label: EMI R; Formats: CD, digital download	3	6	45,000	
Reimport Vol. 2 – Civil Aviation Bureau (逆輸入〜航空局〜, Gyakuyunyū: Kōkūkyoku)	Self-cover album; Released: Dec 6, 2017 (JPN); Label: EMI R; Formats: CD, digital download	3	—	100,000	RIAJ: Gold
"—" denotes items which were released before the creation of the G-Music Chart, or items that did not chart.

=== Remix albums ===
List of remix albums, with selected chart positions
Title	Album details	Peak positions	Sales (JPN)
Title	Album details	JPN	Sales (JPN)
La panacée de tous les maux / Das Allheilmittel für alle Übel (百薬の長, Hyakuyaku no Chō)	Released: November 30, 2022 (JPN); Label: EMI; Formats: CD, digital download	8	6,827

=== Compilation albums ===
List of compilation albums, with selected chart positions
Title	Album details	Peak positions		Sales (JPN)	Certifications
Title	Album details	JPN	TWN East Asia	Sales (JPN)	Certifications
Watashi to Hōden	Released: July 2, 2008 (JPN); Label: Virgin; Formats: 2-CD, digital download	4	3	153,000	RIAJ: Gold
Ukina	Released: November 13, 2013 (JPN); Label: EMI Records Japan; Formats: CD	5	9	35,000	
Mitsugetsu-shō	Released: November 13, 2013 (JPN); Label: EMI; Formats: CD, digital download	6	—	24,000	
Chuixian San Chi (Note: Compilation album released exclusively in Taiwan to commemorate Sheena's first concert performed there.)	Released: June 24, 2015 (TWN); Label: Universal Taiwan; Formats: CD	—	5		
Apple of Universal Gravity	Released: November 13, 2019 (JPN); Label: EMI; Formats: CD, digital download, streaming	1	2	97,200	
Forbidden (禁じ手, Kinjite)	Released: March 11, 2026; Label: EMI; Formats: CD, digital download, streaming	5	—	19,163	
"—" denotes items which were released before the creation of the G-Music Chart, or items that did not chart.

=== Box sets ===
List of box sets, with selected chart positions
Title	Album details	Peak positions		Sales (JPN)	Certifications
Title	Album details	JPN	TWN East Asia	Sales (JPN)	Certifications
Mora	Contains: Muzai Moratorium, Shōso Strip, Kalk Samen Kuri no Hana, Ringo no Uta and Watashi to Hōden; Released: November 25, 2008 (JPN); Label: Virgin; Formats: 4-CD, 6-DVD audio	32 (Note: Also charted at number 25 on the DVD chart.)	—	9,000	

== Extended plays ==
List of extended plays, with selected chart positions
Title	EP details	Peak positions	Sales (JPN)	Certifications
Title	EP details	JPN	Sales (JPN)	Certifications
Ze-Chyou Syuu	Three 8 cm single box set; Released: September 13, 2000 (JPN); Label: Virgin; Formats: 3-CD, digital download	1	430,000	RIAJ: Platinum
Saturday Night Gossip	Released: August 26, 2009 (JPN); Label: Virgin; Formats: Vinyl	100	1,400	

== Singles ==
=== As a lead artist ===
List of singles, with selected chart positions
Title	Year	Peak chart positions			Sales (JPN)	Certifications	Album
Title	Year	JPN	JPN Hot (Note: The Japan Hot 100 was established in February 2008.) (Note: Sources for chart positions are as follows: "Koko de Kiss Shite", "Ariamaru Tomi", "Carnation", "Jiyū e Michizure", "Irohanihoheto", "Kodoku no Akatsuki", "Nippon", "Shijō no Jinsei", "Saihate ga Mitai", "Nagaku Mijikai Matsuri", "Kamisama, Hotokesama", "Work", "Watashi wa Neko no Me", "Ningen to Shite", "La velada legendaria", "Under Experiment", "Fair and Square", "Naked".)	TWN East Asia	Sales (JPN)	Certifications	Album
"Kōfukuron"	1998	10 (Note: Charting position for 1999 12cm re-release. Original edition did not chart.)	—	—	261,000 (Note: Does not include sales of the 8cm edition, as it never charted in the top 100.)	RIAJ (physical): Gold	Muzai Moratorium
"Kabukichō no Joō"	1998	50	—	—	51,000	RIAJ (cellphone): Gold; RIAJ (streaming): Gold	Muzai Moratorium
"Koko de Kiss Shite"	1999	10	70 (Note: Charted in 2009.)	—	309,000	RIAJ (physical): Gold; RIAJ (cellphone): Gold; RIAJ (streaming): Gold	Muzai Moratorium
"Honnō"	1999	2	—	—	998,000	RIAJ (physical): 2× Platinum; RIAJ (cellphone): Gold; RIAJ (streaming): Gold	Shōso Strip
"Gips"	2000	3	—	—	714,000	RIAJ (physical): 2× Platinum; RIAJ (cellphone): Gold	Shōso Strip
"Tsumi to Batsu"	2000	4	—	—	546,000	RIAJ (physical): Platinum	Shōso Strip
"Mayonaka wa Junketsu"	2001	2	—	—	375,000 (Note: Includes sales from the preceding vinyl release of the single.)	RIAJ (physical): Platinum	Non-album single
"Stem"	2003	1	—	—	187,000	RIAJ (physical): Gold	Kalk Samen Kuri no Hana
"Ringo no Uta"	2003	2	—	—	114,000	RIAJ (physical): Gold	Non-album single (Note: Though not included on a solo album by Sheena, "Ringo no Uta" was self-covered by her band Tokyo Jihen on their debut album Kyōiku (2004).)
"Kono Yo no Kagiri" (Ringo Sheena & Neko Saito + Junpei Shiina)	2007	8	—	—	54,000	RIAJ (physical): Gold	Heisei Fūzoku
"Ariamaru Tomi"	2009	3	5	13	75,000	RIAJ (physical): Gold; RIAJ (cellphone): Gold; RIAJ (PC): Gold	Hi Izuru Tokoro
"Carnation"	2011	5	5	—	35,000		Hi Izuru Tokoro
"Jiyū e Michizure"	2012	—	5	—		RIAJ (PC): Gold	Hi Izuru Tokoro
"Irohanihoheto"	2013	8	4	—	25,000		Hi Izuru Tokoro
"Kodoku no Akatsuki"	2013	8	72	—	25,000		Hi Izuru Tokoro
"Nippon"	2014	9	2	—	25,000	RIAJ (digital): Platinum; RIAJ (streaming): Gold	Hi Izuru Tokoro
"Shijō no Jinsei"	2015	12	8	—	11,000		Sandokushi
"Saihate ga Mitai"	2015	—	41	—			Non-album single
"Nagaku Mijikai Matsuri"	2015	6	2	4	34,000	RIAJ (digital): Platinum; RIAJ (streaming): Platinum	Sandokushi
"Kamisama, Hotokesama" (神様、仏様; "God, nor Buddha")	2015	6	38	4	34,000		Sandokushi
"Jiyūdam" (ジユーダム; "Free-dom")	2016	—	30	—			Sandokushi
"Menuki Dōri" (目抜き通り; "The Main Street") (with Tortoise Matsumoto)	2017	—	8	—		RIAJ (digital): Gold	Sandokushi
"Kemono yuku Hosomichi" (獣ゆく細道; "The Narrow Way") (with Hiroji Miyamoto)	2018	—	6	—		RIAJ (digital): Gold; RIAJ (streaming): Gold	Sandokushi
"Niwatori to Hebi to Buta" (鶏と蛇と豚; "Gate of Living")	2019	—	—	—			Sandokushi
"The Sun & Moon in Tokyo" (浪漫と算盤, Roman to Soroban) (with Hikaru Utada)	2019	—	43	—			Apple of Universal Gravity
"Toogood"	2022	—	—	—			Carnival
"Work" (with Millennium Parade)	2023	5	26	—			Non-album singles
"2045" (with Millennium Parade)	2023	5	—	—			Non-album singles
"Je Suis Libre" (私は猫の目, Watashi wa Neko no Me) (Note: "Je Suis Libre" is alternatively titled as "I'm Free" on the digital version of Carnival.)	2023	6	81	—			Carnival
"As a Human" (人間として, Ningen to Shite)	2024	7	64	—	5,464		Carnival
"Aigyo" (愛楽) (with Miliyah Kato)	2024	—	— (Note: "Aigyo" did not enter the Billboard Japan Hot 100 chart, but peaked at number 37 on the Billboard Japan Top Download Songs chart.)	—			Velvet Grace
"La Velada Legendaria" (芒に月, Susuki ni Tsuki)	2025	14	23	—			Forbidden
"Under Experiment" (実験中, Jikken-chū)	2025	17	49	—			TBA
"Fair and Square" (白日のもと, Hakujitsu no Moto)	2025	17	48	—			TBA
"Naked" (裸, Hadaka)	2026	—	31	—			TBA
"—" denotes items which were released before the creation of the G-Music or Billboard Japan Hot 100 charts, or items that did not chart.

=== As a collaborating artist ===
List of singles, with selected chart positions
Title	Year	Peak chart positions		Sales (JPN)	Album
Title	Year	JPN	JPN Hot (Note: Sources for chart positions are as follows: "My Foolish Heart", "Kirakira Bushi", "Koroshiya Kiki Ippatsu", "Apple".)	Sales (JPN)	Album
"Where Is the Love" (Junpei Shiina featuring Ringo Sheena)	2002	—	—		Discover
"Kiken Sugiru" (危険すぎる; "Too Dangerous") (Note: Featured in chorus.) (Kenichi Asai)	2006	14	—	21,000	Johnny Hell
"Amai Yamai" (あまいやまい; "Sweet Sickness") (Maboroshi featuring Ringo Sheena)	2009	—	— (Note: Charted at number 92 on the Hot Top Airplay chart.)		Maboroshi no Shi
"My Foolish Heart" (Soil & "Pimp" Sessions featuring Ringo Sheena)	2009	—	85		6
"Kirakira Bushi" (きらきら武士; "Shining Samurai") (Note: Recorded under the pseudonym Deyonna.) (Rekishi featuring Deyonna)	2011	—	20		Rekitsu
"Koroshiya Kiki Ippatsu" (殺し屋危機一髪; "Close Shave Assassin") (Soil & "Pimp" Sessions featuring Ringo Sheena)	2013	14	18	12,000	Circles
"Apple" (Towa Tei with Ringo Sheena)	2013	76 (Note: 2015 vinyl release.)	60	600	Lucky
"Yasashii Tetsugaku" (やさしい哲学; "Kind Philosophy") (Tomita Lab featuring Ringo Sheena)	2013	—	— (Note: Charted at number 40 on the Adult Alternative Airplay chart.)		Joyous
"Kono Yo wa Fushigi" (この世は不思議; "This World Is Mysterious") (Tomita Lab featuring Yuko Hara, Ken Yokoyama, Ringo Sheena, Yu Sakai)	2013	—	— (Note: Charted at number 23 on the Adult Alternative Airplay chart.)		Joyous
"Nijikan Dake no Vacance" (二時間だけのバカンス) (Hikaru Utada featuring Ringo Sheena)	2016	—	23	150,000	Fantôme
"—" denotes items which were released before the creation of the Billboard Japan Hot 100, or items that did not chart.

=== Promotional singles ===
Title	Year	Peak chart positions	Album
Title	Year	JPN Hot (Note: Sources for chart positions are as follows: "Suberidai", "Shun", "Ryūkō", "Netsuai Hakkakuchū", "Seishun no Matataki", "Sakasa ni Kazoete", "Arikitari na Onna", "Hashire wa Number", "1RKO".)	Album
"Kyogenshō" (虚言症; "I Am a Liar")	2000	—	Shōso Strip
"Yattsuke Shigoto" (やっつけ仕事; "Rush Job")	2000	—	Ze-Chyou Syuu
"I Won't Last a Day Without You" (with Hikaru Utada)	2002	—	Utaite Myōri
"Momen no Handkerchief" (木綿のハンカチーフ; "Cotton Handkerchief") (with Nao Matsuzaki)	2002	—	Utaite Myōri
"Spica" (スピカ, Supika) (Note: Credits: Fusafumi Adachi (足立房文) (from Fujifabric) – drums; Uni Inoue – arrangement, bass, lute, programming, recording, sleigh bells, tambourine, toy percussions, vocoder, zills; Ringo Sheena – arrangement, celesta, drums, piano, sleigh bells, tambourine, toy percussions, vocals, wind chimes)	2002	—	Ichigo Ichie Sweets for My Spitz
"Karisome Otome (Death Jazz Ver.)" (Ringo Sheena x Soil and "Pimp" Sessions)	2006	—	Heisei Fūzoku / Sanmon Gossip
"Suberidai" (すべりだい; "Slide") (Note: Originally released in 1998 on the "Kōfukuron" single.)	2008	91	Watashi to Hōden
"Shun"	2009	36	Sanmon Gossip
"Ryūkō"	2009	74	Sanmon Gossip
"Between Today and Tomorrow"	2012	—	Ukina
"It Was You"	2013	—	Ukina
"Netsuai Hakkakuchū" (with Yasutaka Nakata)	2013	6	Ukina
"Seishun no Matataki"	2014	41	Gyakuyunyū: Kōwankyoku
"Sakasa ni Kazoete" (逆さに数えて; "Count Backwards")	2014	91	"Nippon" (single)
"Arikitari na Onna"	2014	46	Hi Izuru Tokoro
"Hashire Wa Number" (走れゎナンバー; "Go, Rental Car")	2014	43	Hi Izuru Tokoro
"Otona no Okite" (おとなの掟; "The Adult Code") (with Nao Matsuzaki)	2017	52	Non-album singles
"Uta" (唄; "A Song")	2020	—	Non-album singles
"Let's Go!"	2021	—	Non-album singles
"1RKO" (初KO勝ち) (with Nocchi of Perfume)	2024	32	Carnival
"The Sun & Moon (TYO Album Version)" (浪漫と算盤) (with Hikaru Utada)	2024	—	Carnival
"A Procession of the Living" (生者の行進) (with Ai)	2024	—	Carnival
"Offering Sake" (ちりぬるを) (with Ikkyu Nakajima of Tricot)	2024	—	Carnival
"A Grand Triumphant Return" (余裕の凱旋) (with Daoko)	2024	—	Carnival
"FRDP" (ドラ1独走) (with Atarashii Gakko!)	2024	—	Carnival
"Cheers Beer" (ほぼ水の泡) (with Momo of Charan Po Rantan)	2024	—	Carnival
"—" denotes items which were released before the creation of the Billboard Japan Hot 100, or items that did not chart.

== Other appearances ==
List of non-studio album or guest appearances that feature Ringo Sheena. Some collaborations were compiled on Ukina (2013).
Title	Year	Album	Notes
"Becoming" (Takashi Taniguchi)	1998	Becoming	Chorus
"Rock & Hammer" (Takashi Taniguchi)	1998	Becoming	Chorus
"Shiroi Yume" (白い夢; "White Dream") (Heart Bazaar)	1999	Baobab	Piano
"Good for Us!" (Rie Tomosaka)	1999	Murasaki	Background chatter
"Kageriyuku Heya" (翳りゆく部屋; "Darkening Room") (Note: Credits: Uni Inoue (井上雨迩) – recording, mixing; Seiji Kameda – arrangement, bass; Chieko Kinbara Group (金原千恵子グループ) – strings; Hiroshi Kitashiro (北城浩志) – synthesizer operator; Noriyasu "Kaasuke" Kawamura (川村カースケ智康) – drums; Yoichiro "Yokan" Mizue (水江ヨーカン洋一郎) – french horn; Susumu Nishikawa – guitar; Ringo Sheena – vocals)	1999	Dear Yuming	Yumi Matsutoya cover
"Stem"	2004	Our Last Day: Casshern Official Album	Album version arrangement with English lyrics
"Crazy Days Crazy Feeling" (Zazen Boys)	2004	Zazen Boys II	Chorus
"Anminbō" (安眠棒; "Stick of Peaceful Sleep") (Zazen Boys)	2004	Zazen Boys II	Chorus
"You Make Me Feel So Bad" (Zazen Boys)	2004	Zazen Boys II	Chorus
"Rockin' Luuula" (ロッキンルーラ, Rokkun Rūra) (Mo'some Tonebender)	2005	Rockin' Luuula	Piano, chorus
"Mashed Potato Boogie" (マッシュポテト・ブギー, Masshupoteto Bugī) (Mo'some Tonebender)	2005	Rockin' Luuula	Kazoo
"Tokai no Yoru, Watashi no Machi" (都会の夜 わたしの街; "Urban Night, My Town") (Tomita Lab featuring Yuko Hara, Ken Yokoyama, Ringo Sheena, Yu Sakai)	2013	Joyous	
"Ashita no Hito" (明日の人; "Tomorrow's Person") (José James featuring Ringo Sheena)	2014	While You Were Sleeping (Japanese Edition)	

== See also ==
- List of bands associated with Ringo Sheena
- Ringo Sheena production discography
- Ringo Sheena videography
- Tokyo Jihen discography
