= Shijō no Jinsei =

Single by Ringo Sheena

from the album Sandokushi
- Released: January 28, 2015
- Recorded: 2014
- Genre: rock
- Length: 4:11
- Label: EMI Music Japan
- Songwriter: Ringo Sheena
- Producer: Ringo Sheena

Ringo Sheena singles chronology
"Nippon" (2014)	"Shijō no Jinsei" (2015)	"Saihate ga Mitai" (2015)

"Shijō no Jinsei" (Japanese: 至上の人生; "A Life Supreme") is a song by Japanese musician Ringo Sheena. Used as the theme song for the drama Marumaru-zuma, it was released as a single on January 28, 2015.

== Background and development ==
On November 5, 2014, Ringo Sheena released her fifth studio album Hi Izuru Tokoro, her first after parting with her band Tokyo Jihen. Four of the songs featured on the album were used as Japanese television drama theme songs: "Ariamaru Tomi" for Smile (2009), "Carnation" for the morning drama Carnation (2011), "Jiyū e Michizure" for Ataru (2012) and "Irohanihoheto" for Kamo, Kyōto e Iku.: Shinise Ryokan no Okami Nikki.

Before the same time of the release of "Shijō no Jinsei", Sheena was also commissioned to write a song for boyband SMAP, "Karei Naru Gyakushū" (華麗なる逆襲; "Magnificent Counterattack"), which was used as the theme song for the drama Zeni no Sensō, a Japanese remake of the South Korean drama War of Money (2007) starring SMAP member Tsuyoshi Kusanagi. The song was released as a part of SMAP's single "Karei Naru Gyakushū" / "Humor Shichau yo" on February 18, 2015.

The song was written as a tribute to Marumaru-zuma screenwriter Kazuhiko Yukawa and the drama's production staff. Sheena considered the "light" of leading actress Kō Shibasaki as she created the song, and how Shibasaki's presence would affect the song. Sheena was inspired to write about how love reveals the true self. The phrase Shijō no Jinsei was a lyric originally found in her previous single "Nippon".

== Promotion and release ==
The song started airing as Marumaru-zuma's theme song from January 14, 2015 onwards. As the drama's theme song, it was used in promotional activities related to the drama. The physical single was released on February 25, a month before the video release of Sheena's concert tour Ringo-haku '14: Toshi Onna no Gyakushū. The song was performed at Music Station on February 27, and at Count Down TV on February 28.

== Music video ==
A music video was recorded for the song, directed by Takumi Shiga. It was a video that incorporated both "Shijō no Jinsei" and the single's B-side "Donzoko Made", and featured Sheena and a band performing the songs in grayscale.

== Critical reception ==
Shoichi Miyake of Rockin' On Japan felt the song's medium-tempo rock sound was reminiscent of songs from her debut era, such as "Mellow" (2000), and felt the song's chord progression, arrangement and earnestness was analogous to Radiohead's "Creep" (1992). Miyake noted that while the song was tailored for the drama Marumaru-zuma by Sheena, he felt it would become an essential part of her next original album, much like "Ariamaru Tomi" (2009), which had been written for the drama Smile, had become integral to Sheena's fifth studio album Hi Izuru Tokoro (2014). Yūichi Hirayama of EMTG called the song an "extremely heavy medium rock with an overwhelming energetic vocal performance by Ringo", praising the breathy vocals of the second chorus. He noted that the song was larger-than-life, however felt that such a song fit well with an also larger-than-life drama.

== Track listing ==
All tracks are written by Ringo Sheena.

Digital download
No.	Title	Length
1.	"Shijō no Jinsei"	4:11
Total length:		4:11

All tracks are written by Ringo Sheena.

CD single & digital EP
No.	Title	Length
1.	"Shijō no Jinsei"	4:12
2.	"Donzoko Made" (どん底まで, "To Rock Bottom")	2:48
Total length:		7:00

== Personnel ==
Personnel details were sourced from "Shijō no Jinsei"'s liner notes booklet.

- Uni Inoue – manipulator
- Masayuki Hiizumi – synthesizer
- Yukio Nagoshi – guitar
- Ringo Sheena – vocals, manipulator
- Tom Tamada – drums
- Ukigumo – vocals (#2)
- Hitoshi Watanabe – bass

== Charts and sales ==
Chart (2015)	Peak position
Japan Billboard Adult Contemporary Airplay	9
Japan Billboard Japan Hot 100	8
Japan Oricon daily singles	8
Japan Oricon weekly singles	12

=== Sales ===
Chart	Amount
Oricon physical sales	11,000

== Release history ==
Region	Date	Format	Distributing Label	Catalogue codes
Japan	January 14, 2015	Ringtone	EMI Music Japan	
Japan	January 28, 2015	digital download	EMI Music Japan	
South Korea	January 28, 2015	digital download	Universal Music Korea	
Japan	February 25, 2015	CD single, digital download (EP), rental CD	EMI Music Japan	TYCT-30039
South Korea	February 25, 2015	digital download (EP)	Universal Music Korea	
