= Arikitari na Onna =

Promotional single by Ringo Sheena

from the album Hi Izuru Tokoro
- Released: October 1, 2014
- Recorded: 2014
- Genre: Pop
- Length: 4:18
- Label: EMI Records Japan
- Songwriter: Ringo Sheena
- Producer: Ringo Sheena

"Arikitari na Onna" (ありきたりな女; "An Ordinary Woman"), also known by its French title "Une femme ordinaire", is a song by Japanese musician Ringo Sheena. It was the leading promotional song for her fifth album Hi Izuru Tokoro on October 1, 2014.

== Background and development ==
In 2011, Sheena's band Tokyo Jihen made the mutual decision to split up, and in 2012 released an extended play called Color Bars, and performed a farewell tour Bon Voyage. After the tour had finished, Sheena released a digital single "Jiyū e Michizure", the theme song for the drama Ataru. In 2013, Sheena began a year of celebration for the 15th anniversary since her debut. This began with the single "Irohanihoheto" / "Kodoku no Akatsuki" in May, two albums released on November 13, 2013: Ukina, a collaboration compilation album and Mitsugetsu-shō, a live compilation album, and ended with Gyakuyunyū: Kōwankyoku, a self-cover album of songs Sheena had written for other musicians.

After the production of Gyakuyunyū: Kōwankyoku, Sheena was asked by Japanese broadcaster NHK to create a song for their soccer broadcasts in 2014, beginning with the 2014 FIFA World Cup. After being asked in March, Sheena quickly wrote and recorded the song at the start of April. This song, "Nippon", was released as a single in June, and was commercially successful, becoming certified gold for digital downloads by the RIAJ.

== Promotion and release ==
The song was released as a digital download on October 1, a month before the release of Hi Izuru Tokoro. On October 24, Sheena performed "Arikitari na Onna" at Music Station.

== Music video ==
A music video was created for the song, directed by Yuichi Kodama and first unveiled on October 10, 2014. The video was shot in an early Western building in Yokohama, on September 17, with dancers from Idevian Crew.

It features two versions of Sheena, one in a blue dress in a white house, and another upon a stage. The first Sheena sits at a chair as the entire room begins to tilt to the left. As she hits the floor, the second version of Sheena falls out of a box onto the stage of an empty theatre, where she gives a dramatic reading of the song. The video switches between the two Sheenas, with the Sheena in the house performing odd actions, such as removing many convenience store crème caramels onto a plate, and using cellphones as dominoes. From outside the window of her house, there are dancers in orange dresses. They enter the house to dance alongside Sheena, and also appear on stage with the other version of Sheena. Interspersed with these scenes are images of the song's lyrics printed in a book, being read, as well as an image of Sheena sitting in a garden, being offered four different types of foods by hands outside of the camera angle. The video ends with Sheena choosing the carrot out of these four different foods.

== Personnel ==
Personnel details were sourced from Hi Izuru Tokoro's liner notes booklet.

Performers and musicians

- Yukio Nagoshi – guitar
- Ringo Sheena – vocals
- Yoshiaki Sato – piano
- Tom Tamada – drums
- Hiroo Yamaguchi – bass guitar

Technical and production

- Ringo Sheena – arrangement, songwriting

== Charts ==
Chart (2014)	Peak position
Japan Billboard Adult Contemporary Airplay	29
Japan Billboard Japan Hot 100	46

== Release history ==
Region	Date	Format	Distributing Label
Japan	October 1, 2014	Digital download	EMI Records Japan (Virgin Records)
South Korea	October 22, 2014	Digital download	Universal
