= Hi Izuru Tokoro =

- Regular edition cover.

Studio album by Ringo Sheena
- Released: November 5, 2014
- Recorded: 2009–2014
- Genre: Pop; rock; jazz; waltz; Latin
- Length: 50:05
- Language: Japanese; English
- Label: EMI Records Japan (Virgin Records)
- Producer: Ringo Sheena

Ringo Sheena chronology
Gyakuyunyū: Kōwankyoku (2014)	Hi Izuru Tokoro (2014)	Chuíxián Sān Chǐ (2015)

Singles from Hi Izuru Tokoro
- 1. "Ariamaru Tomi" Released: May 27, 2009; 2. "Carnation" Released: October 21, 2011; 3. "Jiyū e Michizure" Released: May 16, 2012; 4. "Irohanihoheto" Released: April 30, 2013; 5. "Kodoku no Akatsuki" Released: May 27, 2013; 6. "Nippon" Released: June 4, 2014; 7. "Arikitari na Onna" Released: October 1, 2014; 8. "Hashire Wa Number" Released: October 22, 2014

Hi Izuru Tokoro (日出処; "The Land of the Rising Sun"), also known as Sunny, is the fifth studio album by Japanese musician Ringo Sheena released on November 5, 2014, by Universal Music Japan sublabel Virgin Records. It is a compilation studio album compiling singles released since 2009 as well as new compositions.

== Background and development ==
Before the release of her fourth album Sanmon Gossip in 2009, which celebrated her 10th anniversary, Sheena released the single "Ariamaru Tomi", used for the drama Smile's theme song. Sheena's main musical project during this time was the band Tokyo Jihen, who after Sanmon Gossip released the albums Sports (2010) and Dai Hakken (2011). 2011 saw the release of another solo single by Sheena, "Carnation". The song was commissioned for the asadora Carnation starring Machiko Ono. Sheena had wanted the song to be released by Tokyo Jihen, however the staff involved with the drama specifically requested the song be under her solo stage name. Sheena compromised by having the members of Tokyo Jihen perform the song with her and appear in the music video, however still labelling it as a 'Ringo Sheena' release.

In 2011, Tokyo Jihen made the mutual decision to split up, and in 2012 released an extended play called Color Bars, and performed a farewell tour Bon Voyage. After the tour had finished, Sheena released a digital single "Jiyū e Michizure", the theme song for the drama Ataru. In 2013, Sheena began a year of celebration for the 15th anniversary since her debut. This began with the single "Irohanihoheto" / "Kodoku no Akatsuki" in May, two albums released on November 13, 2013: Ukina, a collaboration compilation album and Mitsugetsu-shō, a live compilation album, and ended with Gyakuyunyū: Kōwankyoku, a self-cover album of songs Sheena had written for other musicians.

== Writing and production ==
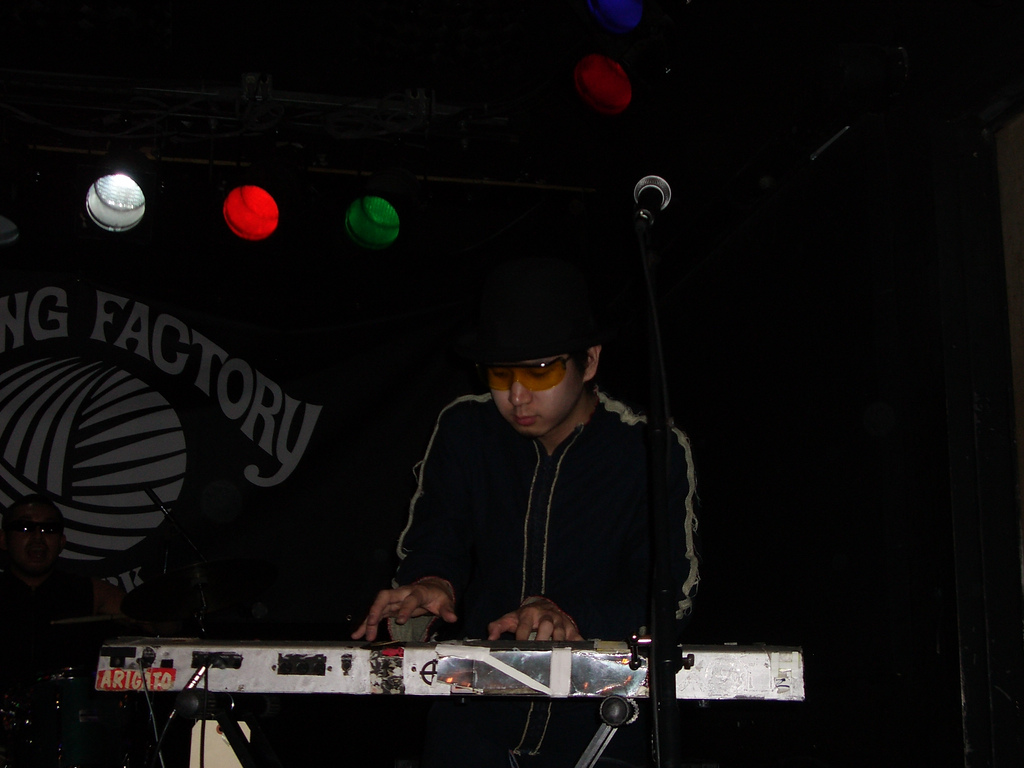
Former Tokyo Jihen member Masayuki Hiizumi collaborated with Sheena on the song "Hashire Wa Number".

In 2009 after the release of "Ariamari Tomi", Sheena noted that she had started mentioning sunlight more in her lyrics. When it came time to start producing Hi Izuru Tokoro in July 2014, this realisation inspired her to write about mainstream and "main street" society. Sheena wanted to write about events that happen in lit places, as well as those that happened in unlit backstreets. The title was inspired by this realisation. Sheena was inspired by Latin music early on in the production process.

Many of the songs feature collaborations with well-known musicians. "Ariamaru Tomi" was composed alongside Barbee Boys songwriter Tomotaka Imamichi, "Jiyū e Michizure" featured Hiroyuki Hayashi of Polysics, Satoshi Ishihara of Going Under Ground and Makoto Sakurai of Dragon Ash performing the song, and "Nippon" featured Shinichi Ubukata of the bands Ellegarden and Nothing's Carved in Stone and studio musician Yukio Nagoshi, who had collaborated in 2009 with Sheena on her song "Yokyō". "Ima" is a song that Sheena had performed live during her Tōtaikai concerts in 2013, however the version that appears on the album is sung in Japanese. "Kodoku no Akatsuki" was sung at the Tōtaikai concerts in a new English language version, which appears on Hi Izuru Tokoro.

Sheena created two session bands to work on the album's new tracks. The first of these was 893 (Hachi Kyū San, "Yakuza"), a band formed to perform her Chotto Shita Reco Hatsu mini-tour in 2014 composed of musicians who had performed with her at her Tōtaikai: Heisei Nijūgo-nendo Kamiyama-chō Taikai concerts in 2013. The band began by recording "Sakasa ni Kazoete" from her "Nippon" (2014) single. The second was 37564 (Mi Na Go Ro Shi, "Massacre"), which formed to perform the song "Nippon" (2014). It originally featured three guitarists: Sheena, session musician Yukio Nagoshi and Shinichi Ubukata of the bands Ellegarden and Nothing's Carved in Stone. During recording for Hi Izuru Tokoro however, 37564 was made up of Nagoshi and two members of the band 100s, Hiroo Yamaguchi and Tom Tamada.

"Hashire Wa Number" is a collaboration with Masayuki Hiizumi, formerly a member of her band Tokyo Jihen from 2004 to 2005. Hiizumi previously worked with Sheena on her album Sanmon Gossip (2009), arranging the song "Ryūkō". "Shizuka Naru Gyakushū" is a song Sheena wrote before her debut in 1998 while she still lived in Fukuoka, previously titled "Kudamono no Heya" (果物の部屋; "Room of Fruit") and given new lyrics. Sheena worked with jazz ensemble and long time collaborators Soil & "Pimp" Sessions on the song "Ima".

The songs were given official European language translations by Sheena. Six of the tracks were given names in English, "Quiet Counterattack", "Collateral Damage", "To the Sea of Trees", "Flight JL005", "Manipulate the Time" and "The Invaluable" respectively for "Shizuka Naru Gyakushū", "Jiyū e Michizure", "Hashire Wa Number", "JL005-bin de", "Chichinpuipui" and "Ariamaru Tomi". Track number four, "Sekidō o Koetara", was given the Portuguese title "Cruzar a linha do equador" ("Crossing the Equator Line"), while the remainder were given French titles: "Présent" ("Present") for "Ima", "Les couleurs chantent" ("The Colours Sing") for "Irohanihoheto", "Une femme ordinaire" ("An Ordinary Woman") for "Arikitari na Onna", "L'œillet" ("The Carnation") for "Carnation" and "La Solitude de l'aube" ("The Solitude of Dawn") for "Kodoku no Akatsuki". The song "Nippon" did not have a title change.

Hi Izuru Tokoro is the first of Sheena's albums as a soloist or with Tokyo Jihen to come packaged with a visual media disc of music videos. Before this album, her solo music videos were released on a series of video albums entitled Sexual Healing, released several months after each studio album.

The album was recorded primarily at Prime Sound Studio Form in Meguro, Tokyo, as well as seven other locations around Tokyo: Onkio Haus, Sound Inn, Studio Sound Valley, Bunkamura Studio, Victor Studio, Aladdin Lounge and Studio Terra.

== Cover artwork ==
The album jacket image — which featured a blonde Sheena alongside a Gibson RD guitar — was made on September 7, 2014, by photographer Shoji Uchida with long time collaborator and art director Yutaka Kimura, who was inspired by popular art styles that were prevalent during the 1950s.

== Promotion and release ==
Immediately after Gyakuyunyū: Kōwankyoku, Sheena released the single "Nippon", a song commissioned by broadcaster NHK for its soccer broadcasts in 2014, beginning with the 2014 FIFA World Cup. The album was promoted by the song "Arikitari na Onna", which was released as a digital download on October 1, 2014, a month before the album's release. "Hashite wa Number" was also released digitally on October 22.

Sheena made four television appearances to promote the album. The first was on October 24 on Music Station, where she performed "Arikitari na Onna". This was followed by a special edition of NHK's Songs, featuring performances of "Carnation", "Nippon" and "Hashire Wa Number" on November 8, a performance at Live Monster on November 9, and an appearance on Switch Interview Tatsujin-tachi on November 22, for which her song "Kodoku no Akatsuki" was acted as the theme song since its release in 2013.

Sheena appeared in issues of the magazines Switch, Gekkan Skyper!, Skyper! TV Guide, Sōen and Rockin' On Japan to promote the album. The issue of Switch featured an extended interview with Sheena, as well as comments by Hideki Noda and a text message conversation between Sheena and Hikaru Utada held in September 2014.

Sheena toured the album in November and December 2014, with the Ringo Haku '14: Toshionna no Gyakushū concerts held in Saitama, Osaka and Fukuoka.

A jazzy instrumental arrangement of "Chichinpuipui" was used as one of the backing tracks to the video presentation promoting the upcoming 2020 Summer Olympics in Tokyo during the closing ceremony of the 2016 Summer Olympics in Rio de Janeiro, Brazil.

== Track listing ==
All lyrics by Ringo Sheena except "Kodoku no Akatsuki (Nobu Neko-ban)" by Aya Watanabe; all music by Sheena except "Ariamaru Tomi" by Sheena and Tomotaka Imamichi.

No.	Title	Arranger(s)	Length
1.	"Shizuka Naru Gyakushū" (静かなる逆襲, "Quiet Counterattack")	Sheena; Youichi Murata	4:03
2.	"Jiyū e Michizure" (自由へ道連れ, "Traveling Companion to Freedom")	Sheena	3:33
3.	"Hashire Wa Number" (走れゎナンバー, "Go, Rental Car")	Sheena	4:16
4.	"Sekidō o Koetara" (赤道を越えたら, "Crossing the Equator")	Sheena; Murata	3:33
5.	"JL005-bin de" (JL005便で, "On Flight JL005")	Sheena; Neko Saito	4:17
6.	"Chichinpuipui" (ちちんぷいぷい, "Abracadabra")	Murata	3:14
7.	"Ima" (今, "Present")	Sheena; Saito	4:14
8.	"Irohanihoheto" (いろはにほへと)	Sheena; Saito	3:19
9.	"Arikitari na Onna" (ありきたりな女, "An Ordinary Woman")	Sheena	4:09
10.	"Carnation" (カーネーション)	Saito	3:00
11.	"Kodoku no Akatsuki (Nobu Neko-ban)" (孤独のあかつき(信猫版), "The Solitude of Dawn (Nobu-Neko Version)")	Sheena; Saito	2:49
12.	"Nippon"	Sheena; Saito	3:54
13.	"Ariamaru Tomi" (ありあまる富, "Excessive Wealth")	Imamichi	5:41
Total length:			50:05

Limited edition bonus DVD/Blu-ray
No.	Title	Director	Length
1.	"Arikitari na Onna"	Yuichi Kodama	4:30
2.	"Irohanihoheto"	Kodama	3:28
3.	"Carnation"	Kodama	3:13
4.	"Nippon"	Kodama	4:11
5.	"Jiyū e Michizure"	Yasuyuki Ozeki	3:35
6.	"Ariamaru Tomi"	Kodama	5:52

== Personnel ==
Personnel details were sourced from Hi Izuru Tokoro's liner notes booklet.

Performers and musicians

- Masato Abe – cello (#7–8, #11–12)
- Goldman Akita (Soil & "Pimp" Sessions) – bass guitar (#7)
- Toshiki Akiyama – viola (#10)
- Toshiyuki Akiyama – viola (#5)
- Akio Andō – contrabass (#10)
- Andy – chorus (#6)
- Kenta Arai – bass guitar (#13)
- Tomoyuki Asakawa – harp (#10–11)
- Kazuki Chiba – contrabass (#7)
- Christophe – chorus (#6)
- Duke – chorus (#6)
- Great Eida – 1st violin (#1)
- Midori Eida – violin (#7, #10)
- Motoko Fujiie – violin (#5)
- Masayoshi Fujimura – violin (#5)
- Otohiko Fujita – horn (#10)
- Keita Fukui – violin (#5)
- Osamu Fukui – fagotto (#10)
- Hirohito Furugawara – viola (#5–6, #8, #11–12)
- Yoshiki Hakoyama – trombone (#6)
- Takashi Hamano – violin (#7)
- Toshiki Hata – drums (#10)
- Hayashi (from Polysics) – guitars (#2)
- Masaki Hayashi – piano (#4), rhodes piano (#5)
- Masayuki Hiizumi – clavinet (#3)
- Hikari – chorus (#6)
- Yuki Horie – cello (#7)
- Aiko Hosokawa – viola (#10, #12)
- Ayako Igarashi – violin (#10)
- Tsutomu Ikeshiro – trombone (#6)
- Tomotaka Imamichi – guitars (#13)
- Shigeki Ippon – contrabass (#5, #8, #11)
- Akane Irie – violin (#5–6, #8, #11–12)
- Satoshi Ishihara (from Going Under Ground) – bass guitar (#2)
- Masahiro Itadaki – violin (#7, #10, #12)
- Shuhei Ito – cello (#1)
- Tomoki Iwanaga – cello (#5)
- Ichiyo Izawa – harpsichord (#8), piano (#10)
- Jōsei (Soil & "Pimp" Sessions) – piano (#7)
- Yuri Kaji – viola (#7–8, #11)
- Seiji Kameda – bass (#10)
- Ayano Kasahara – cello (#6–8, #11–12)
- Tsukasa Kasuya – violin (#7–8, #11)
- Akiko Kato – violin (#5)
- Noriyasu "Kāsuke" Kawamura – drums (#8, #12–13)
- Takaya Kimura – cello (#5)
- Chieko Kinbara – violin (#6)
- Nagisa Kiriyama – violin (#5–8, #10–12)
- Junko Kitayama – horn (#10)
- Takashi Konno – contrabass (#8, #11–12)
- Rieko Kōno – viola (#7)
- Ayumu Koshikawa – violin (#6–8, #10–12)
- Minoru Kuwata – viola (#5, #7), violin (#6, #8, #11–12)
- Ivan Lins – voice (#4)
- Yoshihiko Maeda – cello (#6–8, #10–12)
- Erika Makioka – cello (#8, #10–12)
- Koji Makuchi – contrabass (#5)
- Naoshi Masutani – viola (#5)
- Akiko Maruyama – violin (#6–7, #12)
- Yasuo Maruyama – cello (#5)
- Mataro – Latin percussion (#3, #6)
- Yuri Matsumoto – viola (#10)
- Yōhei Matsuoka – cello (#5)
- Meilani – chorus (#6)
- Midorin (Soil & "Pimp" Sessions) – drums (#4–5, #7)
- Kioko Miki – violin (#7–8, #10–12)
- Shōko Miki – viola (#7–8, #10–11)
- Eric Miyashiro – drums (#6)
- Kaori Morita – cello (#5)
- Makoto Motoi – viola (#5)
- Motoharu (Soil & "Pimp" Sessions) – alto saxophone (#7)
- Mariko Muranaka – cello (#7–8, #10–11)
- Yukinori Murata – violin (#7, #12)
- Yasuko Murata – viola (#5)
- Youichi Murata – trombone (#1, #4, #6)
- Hiroki Muto – violin (#5)
- Mayo Nagao – violin (#10, #12)
- Yukio Nagoshi – guitar (#1, #3–5, #8–9, #12), electric sitar (#8)
- Tetsujin Nakanishi – cello (#5)
- Yasuharu Nakanishi – piano (#6)
- Yuki Nanjo – violin (#8, #10–11)
- Kōji Nishimura – trumpet (#1, #4)
- Tatsuo Ogura – violin (#6–8, #10–12)
- Ken Okabe – violin (#5)
- Machi Okabe – violin (#5)
- Kuniko Okada – violin (#10)
- Naoko Okisawa – cello (#7, #12)
- Sho Okumura – trumpet (#6)
- Yuji Onishi – contrabass (#5)
- Sachie Onuma – viola (#7–8, #11)
- Takayuki Oshikane – violin (#8, #10–11)
- Ray – chorus (#6)
- Jun Saitō – contrabass (#7, #10, #12)
- Neko Saito – solo violin (#11)
- Teruhiko Saitō – contrabass (#7–8, #10–12)
- Makoto Sakurai (from Dragon Ash) – drums (#2)
- Yoshiaki Sato – accordion (#5), piano (#9)
- Shachō (Soil & "Pimp" Sessions) – agitator (#7)
- Ringo Sheena – guitar (#12), vocals
- Kimie Shigematsu – clarinet (#10)
- Yumi Shimazu – cello (#10)
- Yuhki Shinozaki – cello (#10)
- Kon Shirasu – violin (#10, #12)
- Satoshi Shōji – oboe (#10)
- Spike – chorus (#6)
- Masahiko Sugasaka – trumpet (#1, #4, #6)
- Yu Sugino – violin (#5)
- Suginami Junior Chorus – chorus (#13)
- Yuki Sugiyama – violin (#5)
- Ruka Suzuki – viola (#10)
- Tabu Zombie (Soil & "Pimp" Sessions) – trumpet (#7)
- Midori Takada – percussion (#6, #8)
- Kaori Takahashi – violin (#10)
- Hideyo Takakuwa – flute (#6, #10)
- Kenji Takamizu – bass guitar (#6)
- Mayu Takashima – viola (#6, #12)
- Koji Takeda – violin (#5)
- Masakuni Takeno – tenor saxophone (#6)
- Kojiro Takizawa – violin (#7–8, #10–12)
- Tom Tamada – drums (#1, #3, #9)
- Kazuhiro Tanabe – contrabass (#12)
- Shinji Tanaka – contrabass (#7)
- Takashi Taninaka – contrabass (#8, #10–11)
- Ai Tashiro – violin (#5)
- Thomas – chorus (#6)
- Manami Tokutaka – viola (#12)
- Seigen Tokuzawa – cello (#8, #11)
- Kayoko Tomi – contrabass (#5)
- Mao Tomonoh – cello (#10)
- Keisuke Torigoe – bass guitar (#4–5)
- Katsuhiko Toyama – viola (#10)
- Chizuko Tsunoda – violin (#7–8, #10–12)
- Shinichi Ubukata – guitar (#12)
- Ukigumo – guitar (#10)
- Leina Ushiyama – violin (#8, #11)
- Amiko Watabe – viola (#7–8, #11–12)
- Hitoshi Watanabe – bass guitar (#8, #12)
- Yūji Yamada – viola (#6, #8, #11–12)
- Hiroo Yamaguchi – bass guitar (#1, #3, #9)
- Daisuke Yamamoto – violin (#6–8, #11)
- Hideo Yamamoto – drums (#6)
- Takuo Yamamoto – baritone sax (#1, #4, #6), flute (#3)
- Michiyo Yamanari – violin (#5)
- Haruko Yano – violin (#6–8, #11–12)
- Aya Yokomizo – violin (#5)
- Tomoko Yokota – violin (#7–8, #11–12)
- Osamu Yoshida – alto saxophone (#6)

Visuals and imagery

- Central67 – design
- Chikako Aoki – styling
- Shinji Konishi – hair, make-up
- Shoji Uchida – photography

Technical and production

- Satoshi Akai – assistant engineer
- Robbie Clark – English translator
- Great Eida – concertmaster (#6, #8, #10–12)
- Ryota Gomi – assistant engineer
- Kohei Hatakeyama – assistant engineer
- Tomotaka Imamichi – arrangement (#13), additional composition (#13)
- Kiyoshi Itabashi – assistant engineer
- Takushi Iwata – assistant engineer
- Ryo Kanai – assistant engineer
- Takashi Kato – concertmaster (#5)
- Shohei Kojima – assistant engineer
- Shinya Kondo – assistant engineer
- Kōzō Miyamoto – assistant engineer
- Shigeo Miyamoto – mastering engineer
- Fumio Miyata – music coordinator
- Youichi Murata – woodwind arrangement (#1, #4), arrangement (#6)
- Nobuhiko Nakayama – programming (#5, #11–12)
- Atsushi Ōta – assistant engineer
- Neko Saito – arrangement (#10), conductor (#5, #7, #10–12), percussion arrangement (#8), string arrangement (#5, #7–8, #11–12)
- Takashi Saito – assistant engineer
- Shigeo Sakurai – assistant engineer
- Ringo Sheena – arrangement (#1–5, #7–9, #11–12), MIDI (#11), programming (#5), songwriting
- Ryu Takahashi – English translator
- Yuji Tanaka – assistant engineer
- Uni Inoue – recording engineer, mixing engineer
- Jun Watanabe – assistant engineer

== Charts ==
Chart (2014)	Peak position
Japan Oricon daily albums	2
Japan Oricon weekly albums	3
Japan Oricon monthly albums	7
Japan Oricon yearly albums	65

=== Sales and certifications ===
Chart	Amount
Oricon physical sales	100,000
RIAJ physical certification	Gold (100,000+)

== Release history ==
Region	Date	Format	Distributing Label	Catalogue codes
Japan	November 5, 2014	CD, CD/DVD, CD/Blu-ray, digital download	Universal Music Japan	TYCT-60053, TYCT-69069, TYCT-69070
Taiwan	November 7, 2014	CD/DVD	Universal	0652315
Japan	November 22, 2014	Rental CD	Universal Music Japan	TYCT-60053
