= Nippon (song) =

Single by Ringo Sheena

from the album Hi Izuru Tokoro
- B-side: "Sakasa ni Kazoete"
- Released: June 4, 2014
- Recorded: 2014
- Genre: Pop rock
- Length: 3:54
- Label: EMI Music Japan
- Songwriter: Ringo Sheena
- Producer: Ringo Sheena

Ringo Sheena singles chronology
"Koroshiya Kiki Ippatsu" (2013)	"Nippon" (2014)	"Shijō no Jinsei" (2015)

"Nippon" is a song by Japanese musician Ringo Sheena. It was released as a single on June 11, 2014, two weeks after her self-cover album Gyakuyunyū: Kōwankyoku and a year after her previous solo single "Irohanihoheto" / "Kodoku no Akatsuki". The song is being used as the 2014 soccer theme song for NHK., Including the NHK broadcast of 2014 FIFA World Cup.

== Background and development ==
In 2013 and 2014, Sheena had celebrated her 15th anniversary since her debut single "Kōfukuron". She began with the single "Irohanihoheto/Kodoku no Akatsuki" in May, following this up in November with two compilation albums, Ukina and Mitsugetsu-shō, and a series of lives entitled Tōtaikai: Heisei Nijūgo-nen Kaneyama-chō Taikai (党大会 平成二十五年神山町大会; "The Party Convention: 2013 Kamiyama Event"). She finished the anniversary year on the day with an album called Gyakuyunyū: Kōwankyoku, which featured new versions of songs she had given to other musicians.

In previous years, NHK had selected Superfly's "Tamashii Revolution" (2010), Radwimps' "Kimi to Hitsuji to Ao" (2011–2012) and Sakanaction's "Aoi" (2013–2014) as their soccer broadcast theme song. "Tamashii Revolution" in particular was commercially successful, being certified gold twice by the RIAJ for digital downloads.

== Writing and production ==
The song was written for NHK after they requested a song by Sheena for their soccer broadcasts. NHK asked Sheena to create the song in March, and she quickly produced it at the start of April. NHK requested a song that expressed the samurai and nadeshiko spirit of Japan that could also be used for broadcasts featuring other teams, and asked if the song could feature "blue" in the lyrics (i.e. the colour of the Japan national football team) Sheena wanted to use the Tokyo Jihen song "Gunjō Biyori" due to its mention of blue and its well-fitting tempo and chords, however created a new song after considering's specific requests for the song they desired. The song was inspired by her time living in Shimizu, Shizuoka, which she considers the "soccer kingdom" of Japan. It was also inspired by everything she experienced with her band Tokyo Jihen, such as their 2010 sports-themed album Sports and the song "Atarashii Bunmeimaika" (2011). Sheena felt a lot of pressure, as she does not consider herself seen as a sporty musician.

The B-side "Sakasa ni Kazoete" was also given the Spanish language title "Cuenta atrás" ("count back"), her second song title in Spanish after "Paisaje" on Gyakuyunyū: Kōwankyoku. Contrasting "Nippon", a song about special occasions, Sheena wrote the song dealing with everyday things.

The song featured three guitarists: Sheena, Shinichi Ubukata of the bands Ellegarden and Nothing's Carved in Stone, and studio musician Yukio Nagoshi, who had collaborated in 2009 with Sheena on her song "Yokyō". Additional members included Hitoshi Watanabe of the 1980s band Shi-Shonen on bass, Muzai Moratorium drummer Noriyasu Kawamura and programming by Nobuhiko Nakayama. Great Eida Strings performed an orchestral backing, led by conductor Neko Saito. Several of these musicians had collaborated with Sheena on Gyakuyunyū: Kōwankyoku: Ubukata and Kawamura had performed together on "Amagasa", while Nagoshi has performed on "Cappuccino". Nakayama had produced the song "Ketteiteki Sanpunkan", while Great Eida Strings had performed "Bōenkyō no Soto no Keshiki".

== Promotion and release ==
NHK timed the switch over of theme songs from Sakanaction's "Aoi" to "Nippon" to coincide with the 2014 FIFA World Cup. Sheena performed "Nippon" on NHK on June 8, first airing on the NHK BS premium program Soccer World Cup Kōfun wa Oto to Tomo ni and the clip again on Music Japan. It featured 300 people performing the song, including Sheena, a traditional rock band, a string orchestra and a cheer-squad. The song was performed again at CDTV on June 14, and at Music Station on June 20, in a special 2014 FIFA World Cup-themed broadcast, including News' "One (For the Win)" and Naoto Inti Raymi's "The World Is Ours!". Sheena performed the song at the 65th Kōhaku Uta Gassen on December 31, 2014, therein titled "NIPPON -Kōhaku Borderless Edit-", again featuring a cheer squad.

Sheena appeared on Seiji Kameda's radio corner Behind the Melody: FM Kameda on the J-Wave radio program Beat Corner, on June 9, 10, 11 and 12, making it the first time the pair have worked together publicly since the break-up of Tokyo Jihen in 2012.

For the release of Gyakuyunyū: Kōwankyoku, Sheena performed a four date tour called Chotto Shita Recohatsu 2014 (ちょっとしたレコ発 2014; "A Little Release Party 2014"). She performed "Sakasa ni Kazoete" at these lives as one of the encore songs.

On June 10, 2014, a music video was released for the song. The Yuichi Kodama-directed music video featured scenes of Sheena and her bandmates performing the song in greyscale, in a studio.

The B-side "Sakasa ni Kazoete" was successful enough to chart at number 91 on the Billboard Japan Hot 100.

== Critical reception ==
Tomoko Imai from Rockin' On Japan praised the song, calling it "reassuringly catchy rock" with "vuvuzela-like sounds on top of a Ramones-like tough beat". She praised the addition of Ubukata and Nagoshi on guitars, and felt like the song was perfect for a soccer anthem. CDJournal reviewers described the song as "straight pitch rock 'n' roll overflowing with feelings of speed". They noted the song's overlaying of Sheena, the "elegant" large scale strings section and the "raging" band sound.

Some internet commentators felt that the song came across as overly nationalist. Asahi Shimbun commented that the lyric "the most untainted, noble blue on the planet" (この地球上で いちばん 混じり気の無い気高い青, kono chikyūjō de ichiban majirike no nai kedakai ao) made the Japanese national soccer team colour equivalent to blood purity.

Music critic Takayuki Ishiguro felt the Japan-based lyrics were a high risk for the 2014 FIFA World Cup, given that it was predicted that Japan would be knocked out early, and that it was an inappropriate song to play during matches that did not involve Japan. Journalist Yoshiaki Sei felt that the song was a misunderstanding of what soccer culture was, as he considered soccer a "symbol of mixing peoples and cultures". Music critic Akimasa Munetaka argued that the song was not political, noting that Sheena was a musician who had incorporated traditional Japanese aspects since her debut. Munetaka felt that the song was just an exaggeration of these aspects.

== Track listing ==
All tracks are written by Ringo Sheena.

No.	Title	Arranger	Length
1.	"Nippon"	R. Sheena, Neko Saito (strings)	3:54
2.	"Sakasa ni Kazoete" (逆さに数えて, "Count Backwards")	Ringo Sheena	3:17
Total length:			7:11

== Personnel ==
Personnel details were sourced from "Nippon"'s liner notes booklet. To perform "Nippon", Sheena formed a band called 37564, and one called 893 for "Sakasa ni Kazoete". 893 performed with Sheena live during her Chotto Shita Recohatsu tour in May 2014.

37564 band members

- Noriyasu "Kāsuke" Kawamura – drums
- Yukio Nagoshi – guitar
- Nobuhiko Nakayama – programming
- Ringo Sheena – vocals, guitar
- Shinichi Ubukata – guitar
- Hitoshi Watanabe – bass

893 band members

- Masaki Hayashi – Wurlitzer electric piano
- Midorin from Soil & "Pimp" Sessions – drums
- Yoshiaki Sato – Hammond organ
- Ringo Sheena – vocals
- Keisuke Torigoe – contrabass

Other musicians, technical and production

- Masato Abe – cello (#1)
- Satoshi Akai – assistant engineer
- Robbie Clark – English translator
- Great Eida – 1st violin (#1)
- Hirohito Furugawara – viola (#1)
- Ryota Gomi – assistant engineer
- Aiko Hosokawa – viola (#1)
- Uni Inoue – recording engineer, mixing engineer
- Akane Irie – 1st violin (#1)
- Ayano Kasahara – cello (#1)
- Nagisa Kiriyama – 1st violin (#1)
- Shinya Kondo – assistant engineer
- Ayumu Koshikawa – 1st violin (#1)
- Kioko Miki – 1st violin (#1)
- Takashi Konno – contrabass (#1)
- Minoru Kuwata – 2nd violin (#1)
- Masahiro Itadaki – 2nd violin (#1)
- Shuhei Ito – cello (#1)
- Yoshihiko Maeda – cello (#1)
- Erika Makioka – cello (#1)
- Akiko Maruyama – violin (#1)
- Shigeo Miyamoto – mastering engineer
- Fumio Miyata – musician coordinator
- Yukinori Murata – 1st violin (#1)
- Mayo Nagao – 2nd violin (#1)
- Tatsuo Ogura – 2nd violin (#1)
- Naoko Okisawa – cello (#1)
- Atsushi Ōta – assistant engineer
- Jun Saitō – contrabass (#1)
- Neko Saito – conductor (#1)
- Teruhiko Saitō – contrabass (#1)
- Kon Shirasu – 2nd violin (#1)
- Mayu Takashima – viola (#1)
- Kojiro Takizawa – 1st violin (#1)
- Kazuhiro Tanabe – contrabass (#1)
- Manami Tokutaka – viola (#1)
- Chizuko Tsunoda – 2nd violin (#1)
- Amiko Watabe – viola (#1)
- Yūji Yamada – viola (#1)
- Haruko Yano – 1st violin (#1)
- Tokomo Yokota – 2nd violin (#1)

== Charts and sales ==
Chart (2014)	Peak position
Japan Billboard Adult Contemporary Airplay	1
Japan Billboard Japan Hot 100	2
Japan Oricon daily singles	5
Japan Oricon weekly singles	9
Japan Oricon monthly singles	24

=== Sales and certifications ===
Chart	Amount
Oricon physical sales	25,000
RIAJ digital download certification	Gold (100,000)
RIAJ streaming certification	Gold (100,000,000)

== Release history ==
Region	Date	Format	Distributing Label	Catalogue codes
Japan	June 4, 2014	Digital download	EMI Music Japan	
Japan	June 11, 2014	CD, Rental CD	EMI Music Japan	TYCT-30027
