= Koroshiya Kiki Ippatsu =

Single by Soil & "Pimp" Sessions and Ringo Sheena

from the album Circles and Ukina
- B-side: "Pimp Panther"; "Spy High"
- Released: June 12, 2013
- Recorded: 2013
- Genre: Jazz, punk jazz
- Length: 2:35
- Label: Victor Entertainment
- Songwriters: Ringo Sheena, Tabu Zombie

Soil & "Pimp" Sessions singles chronology
"Jazzy Conversation" (2013)	"Koroshiya Kiki Ippatsu" (2013)	"Omote Nothin' Ura Girl" (2014)

Ringo Sheena singles chronology
"Kodoku no Akatsuki" (2013)	"Koroshiya Kiki Ippatsu" (2013)	"Nippon" (2014)

"Koroshiya Kiki Ippatsu" (殺し屋危機一髪; "Close Shave Assassin"), also known by its English title "The Assassin's Assassin," is a single by Japanese jazz band Soil & "Pimp" Sessions, featuring singer and songwriter Ringo Sheena. It was released on June 12, 2013, digitally and on June 26 as a single, two months after Soil & "Pimp" Sessions' single "Jazzy Conversation," and one month after Sheena's single "Irohanihoheto/Kodoku no Akatsuki."

== Background and development ==
Ringo Sheena had taken an interest in the band in the early 2000s, attending live concerts of theirs before their debut in 2003. They had collaborated several times in the past, the first time on the digital single "Karisome Otome (Death Jazz Version)" in 2006. They collaborated again in 2009 on Sheena's song "Mayakashi Yasaotoko" from the album Sanmon Gossip, and the Soil & "Pimp" Sessions song "My Foolish Heart" on their album 6.

"Koroshiya Kiki Ippatsu" was a single released to commemorate Soil & "Pimp" Sessions' 10th anniversary. It was the second collaboration single released by Soil & "Pimp" Sessions in 2013, after "Jazzy Conversation" with Rhymester. These were compiled on the album Circles, an album featuring Soil & "Pimp" Sessions collaborating with different vocalists. Similarly, at the end of 2013, Ringo Sheena released the album Ukina, an album that compiled collaborations she had undertaken between 1998 and 2013.

== Writing and production ==
The song features an arrangement by conductor Neko Saito, who has collaborated with Sheena on many occasions. This was rare for Soil & "Pimp" Sessions, as they generally did not collaborate with outside arrangers for their music. As such, the song features many instruments that are not present in other Soil & "Pimp" Sessions songs: a string section, the timpani, and the harp. A bonus track on Circles, "Koroshiya Kiki Ippatsu (Death Jazz Ver.)," features an arrangement by Soil & "Pimp" Sessions.

== Promotion and release ==
On September 27, 2013, Soil & "Pimp" Sessions held a live at Billboard Live in Tokyo. Sheena made a guest appearance, performing "Koroshiya Kiki Ippatsu" and her previous collaborations with the band, "My Foolish Heart" and "Karisome Otome." The single's B-side "Pimp Panther" was also performed by the band. During Sheena's Tōtaikai concerts in November 2013, she performed "Koroshiya Kiki Ippatsu" with her concert band.

== Music video ==
The Yuichi Kodama-directed music video was released on June 1, 2013. It features the members of Soil & "Pimp" Sessions as assassins on a luxury liner, and Sheena as a woman manipulating them. The video was nominated at the 2014 MTV Video Music Awards Japan for the Best Collaboration video.

== Track listing ==
No.	Title	Lyrics	Music	Arranger	Length
1.	"Koroshiya Kiki Ippatsu"	Ringo Sheena	R. Sheena, Tab Zombie	Neko Saito	2:39
2.	"Pimp Panther" (ピンプパンサー Pimpu Pansā)		Tab Zombie	Soil & "Pimp" Sessions	4:07
3.	"Spy High"		Shachō	Soil & "Pimp" Sessions	4:08
Total length:					10:54

== Personnel ==
Personnel details were sourced from Sheena's official website.

Soil & "Pimp" Sessions

- Goldman Akita – contrabass
- Jōsei – piano, keyboards
- Midorin – drums
- Motoharu – saxophone
- Shachō – agitator, songwriting (track 3)
- Tabu Zombie – trumpet, songwriting (track 1, 2)

Other musicians

- Tomoyuki Asakawa – harp (track 1)
- Great Eida – concert master (track 1)
- Midori Eida – violin (track 1)
- Takashi Hamano – violin (track 1)
- Ayano Kasahara – cello (track 1)
- Eriko Kawano – viola (track 1)
- Ayumu Koshikawa – violin (track 1)
- Nobuhiko Maeda – cello (track 1)
- Yoshihiko Maeda – cello (track 1)
- Yukinori Murata – violin (track 1)
- Tatsuo Ogura – violin (track 1)
- Neko Saito – conductor (track 1)
- Ringo Sheena – vocals, songwriting (track 1)
- Midori Takada – timpani (track 1)
- Mayu Takashima – viola (track 1)
- Kōjirō Takizawa – violin (track 1)
- Chizuko Tsunoda – violin (track 1)
- Daisuke Yamamoto – violin (track 1)
- Haruko Yano – violin (track 1)

== Charts and sales ==
Chart (2013)	Peak position
Japan Billboard Adult Contemporary Airplay	39
Japan Billboard Japan Hot 100	18
Japan Oricon weekly singles	14

=== Sales and certifications ===
Chart	Amount
Oricon physical sales	12,000

== Release history ==
Region	Date	Format	Distributing Label	Catalogue codes
Japan	June 12, 2013	Digital download	Victor Entertainment	
Japan	June 26, 2013	CD, digital download (EP)	Victor Entertainment	VICL-36788
Japan	July 13, 2013	Rental CD	Victor Entertainment	VICL-36788
