= Kodoku no Akatsuki =

- Physical and full-length edition "Irohanihoheto/Kodoku no Akatsuki" cover.

Single by Ringo Sheena

from the album Hi Izuru Tokoro
- Released: May 27, 2013
- Recorded: 2013
- Genre: Pop
- Length: 3:04
- Label: EMI Music Japan
- Songwriters: Ringo Sheena, Aya Watanabe
- Producer: Ringo Sheena

Ringo Sheena singles chronology
"Irohanihoheto" (2013)	"Kodoku no Akatsuki" (2013)	"Koroshiya Kiki Ippatsu" (2013)

"Kodoku no Akatsuki" (孤独のあかつき; "The Solitude of Dawn") (also known by its French title "La Solitude de l'aube") is a song by Japanese musician Ringo Sheena. It was released as one of the A-sides of her 14th single, along with the song "Irohanihoheto", released on May 27, 2013. The release date was the 15th anniversary of the release of Sheena's debut single "Kōfukuron" in 1998.

== Background and development ==
In early 2012, Sheena's band Tokyo Jihen disbanded, and released a string of releases, including the extended play Color Bars, the live compilation album Tokyo Collection, the B-side collection Shin'ya Waku, and performed their farewell tour, Bon Voyage. On May 16, 2012, Sheena released her first post-Tokyo Jihen solo work, the digital single "Jiyū e Michizure." This song acted as the theme song for the TBS drama Ataru, starring Masahiro Nakai.

It was later revealed that Sheena was heavily pregnant with her second child during the single's release. As she did not feel it was appropriate to link single promotions with the birth of a child, she waited until her Tōtaikai concerts in November to reveal this.

== Writing and production ==
Sheena worked together with producer and guitarist Yukio Nagoshi on the song, as well as "Irohanihoheto". Sheena had previously worked with Nagoshi during her Ringo Expo concerts in 2008, and on the songs "Zero Chiten Kara," "Togatta Teguchi" and "Yokyō" on her solo album Sanmon Gossip (2009). Her previous Tokyo Jihen bandmate Ichiyo Izawa played the harpsichord on "Irohanihoheto." Bassist Hitoshi Watanabe had previously worked with Sheena as a member of Bōtoku Vitamin, one of the bands who performed on her album Utaite Myōri: Sono Ichi (2002). Drummer Noriyasu Kawamura previously worked with Sheena on her debut album Muzai Moratorium (1999).

"Kodoku no Akatsuki" is a song featuring lyrics written by screenwriter Aya Watanabe, who wrote the screenplay for the NHK morning drama Carnation. This is the first time Sheena did not write the lyrics to a promoted single track. The pair had worked together on Carnation, as Sheena had written the eponymous theme song, but had never met face to face before. After being asked to write a theme song for an NHK show called Switch Interview: Tatsujintachi, Sheena was inspired by the concept of the program, in which a team of interviewers ask and debate topics. She wanted to express this teamwork nature in the song, so asked Watanabe to write the lyrics. She came up with the melody for the song after hearing her son and her elementary school age niece singing the children's song "Kaijū no Ballad."

== Promotion and release ==
The song was released a month after the single's first A-side, "Irohanihoheto", was made available for download digitally. "Kodoku no Akatsuki" was used as the theme show for the NHK Educational TV program Switch Interview: Tatsujintachi. During Sheena's Tōtaikai concerts in November 2013, Sheena performed an English language version of "Kodoku no Akatsuki".

== Critical reception ==
OK Music reviewers felt that "Kodoku no Akatsuki"'s "sentimental lyrics and electric piano are impressive", believing that it would be a popular song at Sheena's live concerts.

== Track listing ==
All music is composed by Ringo Sheena.

Full-length single
No.	Title	Lyrics	Arranger	Length
1.	"Irohanihoheto"	Ringo Sheena	R. Sheena	3:19
2.	"Kodoku no Akatsuki"	Aya Watanabe	R. Sheena	3:04
Total length:				6:24

== Personnel ==
Personnel details were sourced from the liner notes booklets of "Irohanihoheto/Kodoku no Akatsuki" and Hi Izuru Tokoro.

=== Single version ===
Performers and musicians

- Hirohisa Horie – Wurlitzer electric piano
- Noriyasu Kawamura – drums
- Yukio Nagoshi – guitars, electric sitar
- Ringo Sheena – vocals, chorus, songwriting
- Hitoshi Watanabe – bass

Technical and production

- Uni Inoue – recording engineer, mixing engineer
- Shohei Kojima – assistant engineer
- Kozo Miyamoto – assistant engineer
- Shigeo Miyamoto – mastering engineer
- Fumio Miyata – musician coordinator
- Hiroshi Satō – assistant engineer
- Yuji Tanaka – instrument technician

=== Nobuneko version ===
Performers and musicians

- Masato Abe – cello
- Tomoyuki Asakawa – harp
- Great Eida – concertmaster
- Hirohito Furugawara – viola
- Shigeki Ippon – contrabass
- Akane Irie – violin
- Yuri Kaji – viola
- Ayano Kasahara – cello
- Tsukasa Kasuya – violin
- Nagisa Kiriyama – violin
- Takashi Konno – contrabass
- Ayumu Koshikawa – violin
- Minoru Kuwata – violin
- Yoshihiko Maeda – cello
- Erika Makioka – cello
- Kioko Miki – violin
- Shōko Miki – viola
- Mariko Muranaka – cello
- Nobuhiko Nakayama – programming
- Yuki Nanjo – violin
- Tatsuo Ogura – violin
- Sachie Onuma – viola
- Takayuki Oshikane – violin
- Neko Saito – conductor, string arrangement, solo violin
- Teruhiko Saitō – contrabass
- Ringo Sheena – arrangement, MIDI
- Kojiro Takizawa – violin
- Takashi Taninaka – contrabass
- Seigen Tokuzawa – cello
- Chizuko Tsunoda – violin
- Leina Ushiyama – violin
- Amiko Watabe – viola
- Yūji Yamada – viola
- Daisuke Yamamoto – violin
- Haruko Yano – violin
- Tomoko Yokota – violin

== Charts and sales ==
Chart (2013)	Peak position
Japan Billboard Japan Hot 100	72
Japan Oricon weekly singles: "Irohanihoheto/Kodoku no Akatsuki"	8

=== Sales ===
Chart	Amount
Oricon physical sales: "Irohanihoheto/Kodoku no Akatsuki"	25,000

== Release history ==
Region	Date	Format	Distributing Label	Catalogue codes
Japan	May 27, 2013	CD, Full EP digital download	EMI Records Japan	TOCT-40420
Taiwan	May 31, 2013	CD	Gold Typhoon	I5321
