= Carnival (Ringo Sheena album) =

2024 studio album by Ringo Sheena

Studio album by Ringo Sheena
- Released: May 29, 2024
- Recorded: 2019–2024
- Genre: Jazz
- Length: 44:04
- Language: Japanese; English; French; Spanish
- Label: EMI
- Producer: Ringo Sheena; Neko Saito; Yoichi Murata

Ringo Sheena chronology
das Allheilmittel für alle Übel (2022)	Carnival (2024)	Forbidden (2026)

Singles from Carnival
- 1. "Toogood" Released: April 5, 2022; 2. "I'm Free" Released: May 24, 2023; 3. "As a Human" Released: April 17, 2024

Carnival, alternatively titled Hōjōya (放生会; lit. "life's release") is the seventh solo studio album by Japanese singer Ringo Sheena, released on May 29, 2024, via EMI Records. Preceded by the release of three singles, "Toogood", "I'm Free", and "As a Human", alongside multiple promotional singles, the album was announced two days prior to its release. Primarily a jazz record with French pop and orchestral influences, Sheena collaborated with various female artists on the album, including Hikaru Utada, Nocchi, Ai, and Atarashii Gakko!.

== Background ==
Ringo Sheena released her sixth solo studio album, Sandokushi, in 2019. In 2022, she released a remix album, das Allheilmittel für alle Übel, which received criticism due to its album cover bearing similarity to the Red Cross emblem.

On May 27, 2024, Sheena announced in celebration of her 25th anniversary in the music industry, she would be releasing a studio album on May 29.

== Writing and production ==
Primarily working with male artists on her previous studio album, Sheena wrote songs for Carnival with other female artists in mind. Describing the seven female artists as "divas", Sheena stated on the album's liner notes that she "wanted people younger than her to express themselves more freely."

== Promotion ==
On the day Carnival was announced, the seven duets on the album were released the same day. Music videos for each of the songs, excluding "The Sun & Moon" with Hikaru Utada which was originally released in 2019, were released the next day. All of the music videos were directed by Yuichi Kodama. In promotion of the album, Sheena will be embarking on an arena tour.

== Track listing ==
All tracks are written and produced by Ringo Sheena except where noted.

Carnival track listing
No.	Title	Producer(s)	Length
1.	"Offering Sake" (ちりぬるを) (with Ikkyu Nakajima)		3:40
2.	"I'm Free" (私は猫の目)	Neko Saito	3:35
3.	"A Procession of the Living" (生者の行進) (with Ai)	Yoichi Murata	3:00
4.	"As a Human" (人間として)		3:14
5.	"1RKO" (初KO勝ち) (with Nocchi)	Murata	3:31
6.	"Open Secret" (公然の秘密)	Murata	3:00
7.	"The Sun & Moon" (浪漫と算盤) (with Hikaru Utada)		4:22
8.	"Closed Truth" (茫然も自失)		3:03
9.	"FRDP" (ドラ1独走) (with Atarashii Gakko!)		3:03
10.	"Bye Purity" (さらば純情)	Murata	3:49
11.	"A Grand Triumphant Return" (余裕の凱旋) (with Daoko)		3:13
12.	"Toogood" (いとをかし)		3:15
13.	"Cheers Beer" (ほぼ水の泡) (with Momo)		3:19
Total length:			44:04

Notes

- Tracks 2, 6, 10 and 12 are noted as "Album version".
- Track 7 is noted as "Tokyo Album version".
- "I'm Free" is alternatively titled as "Je Suis Libre" on its digital single release.

== Personnel ==
Musicians

- Ringo Sheena – vocals, programming (all tracks), conductor (3)
- Keisuke Torigoe – bass (all tracks)
- Shun Ishiwaka – drums (tracks 1–11, 13), percussion (1, 3, 13), tubular bells, glockenspiel (4)
- Yukio Nagoshi – guitars (tracks 1, 2, 5, 7, 10, 11, 13)
- Masaki Hayashi – piano (tracks 1, 3, 8, 10, 12, 13), Wurlitzer electric piano (1)
- Takuo Yamamoto – flute (tracks 1, 5), baritone saxophone (2), saxophone (3), tenor saxophone (6)
- Ikkyu Nakajima – vocals (track 1)
- Yoichi Murata – trombone (tracks 2–4, 6, 10), euphonium (10)
- Koji Nishimura – trumpet (tracks 2–4, 6, 10)
- Great Eida Strings – strings (2, 4–6, 10)
- Great Eida – violin (tracks 2, 4–6, 10)
- Haruko Yano – violin (tracks 2, 4–6, 10)
- Ayano Kasahara – cello (tracks 2, 4–6)
- Mayu Takashima – viola (tracks 2, 4–6)
- Yuji Yamada – viola (tracks 2, 4, 5, 10)
- Jo Kuwata – violin (tracks 2, 4, 5, 10)
- Akiko Maruyama – violin (tracks 2, 4, 5)
- Akane Irie – violin (tracks 2, 4, 6)
- Kanako Higashiyama – violin (tracks 2, 4, 6)
- Sho Okumura – trumpet (tracks 2, 4, 6)
- Kanako Sakata – violin (tracks 2, 4, 10)
- Tomoyuki Asakawa – harp (tracks 2, 4)
- Masahiro Miyake – violin (tracks 2, 4)
- Takayuki Oshikane – violin (tracks 2, 4)
- Yumi Negoro – violin (tracks 2, 4)
- Junpei Hayashida – cello (tracks 2, 5, 6)
- Ichiyo Izawa – piano (track 2), clavichord (5), Wurlitzer electric piano (5, 9, 11), guitars (9), organ (11)
- Midori Takada – timpani (tracks 2, 6), tubular bells (6)
- Neko Saito – conductor (track 2)
- Osamu Koike – tenor saxophone (track 2)
- Azusa Toujyou – trombone (track 2)
- Katsuhisa Asari – trombone (track 2)
- Hitomi Niida – trumpet (track 2)
- Ai – vocals (track 3)
- Hirohito Furugawara – viola (tracks 4–6, 10)
- Hideyo Takakuwa – flute (tracks 4, 5, 10)
- Naka Hidehito – clarinet (tracks 4, 5)
- Satoshi Shoji – oboe (tracks 4, 5)
- Erika Makioka – cello (tracks 4, 6)
- Amiko Watabe – viola (tracks 4, 6)
- Keiko Shiga – violin (tracks 4, 6)
- Kioko Miki – violin (tracks 4, 6)
- Akira Ishikawa – bassoon (track 4)
- Yuka Sakai – bassoon (track 4)
- Masao Watanabe – cello (track 4)
- Yuki Shinozaki – cello (track 4)
- Yuka Takashi – clarinet (track 4)
- Yoshinobu Takeshita – double bass (4)
- Michiyo Morikawa – flute (track 4)
- Izumi Kohki – horn (track 4)
- Kaname Hamaji – horn (track 4)
- Mayuko Morieda – oboe (track 4)
- Shinsuke Torizuka – trombone (track 4)
- Mari Asai – violin (track 4)
- Nagisa Kiriyama – violin (track 4)
- Yukinori Murata – violin (track 4)
- Uni Inoue – clapping (track 5), percussion (7), tambourine (9)
- Takashi Hamano – violin (tracks 5, 10)
- Nocchi – vocals (track 5)
- Masayuki Hiizumi – clavichord (track 6), Wurlitzer electric piano (7)
- Ado Matsumoto – violin (tracks 6, 10)
- Akiko Shimauchi – violin (tracks 6, 10)
- Yui Kaneko – violin (tracks 6, 10)
- Kei Suzuki – alto saxophone (track 6)
- Yoshihiko Maeda – cello (track 6)
- Takashi Ohi – vibraphone (track 6)
- Go Tomono – viola (track 6)
- Ayumu Koshikawa – violin (track 6)
- Yuki Nakajima – violin (track 6)
- Hikaru Utada – vocals (track 7)
- Yoshiaki Sato – accordion (tracks 8, 12, 13), organ (13)
- Atarashii Gakko! – vocals (track 9)
- Otohiko Fujita – horn (track 10)
- Akiko Maruyama – violin (track 10)
- Hijiri Kuwano – violin (track 10)
- London Voices – chorus (track 11)
- Ben Parry – chorus master (track 11)
- Terry Edwards – chorus master (track 11)
- Kevin Lin – concert master (track 11)
- Robert Ziegler – conductor (track 11)
- London Philharmonic Orchestra – orchestra (track 11)
- Daoko – vocals (track 11)
- Momo – vocals (track 13)

Technical

- Uni Inoue – mixing, engineering
- Ringo Sheena – recording arrangement (tracks 1, 3–9, 11–13)
- Masahito Komori – engineering (track 7)
- Simon Rhodes – engineering (track 11)
- Neko Saito – recording arrangement (track 2)
- Yoichi Murata – horn arrangement (tracks 3, 5, 6), string arrangement (5), recording arrangement (10)

== Charts ==
=== Weekly charts ===
Weekly chart performance for Carnival
Chart (2024)	Peak position
Japanese Albums (Oricon)	2
Japanese Combined Albums (Oricon)	3
Japanese Hot Albums (Billboard Japan)	4

=== Monthly charts ===
Monthly chart performance for Carnival
Chart (2024)	Position
Japanese Albums (Oricon)	8

=== Year-end charts ===
Year-end chart performance for Carnival
Chart (2024)	Position
Japanese Albums (Oricon)	80
Japanese Hot Albums (Billboard Japan)	72

== Release history ==
Release history and formats for Carnival
Region	Date	Format(s)	Version	Label	Ref.
Various	May 29, 2024	Digital download; streaming	Standard	EMI; Universal	
Japan	May 29, 2024	CD	Standard	EMI; Universal Japan	
Japan	May 29, 2024	CD	Limited	EMI; Universal Japan	
Japan	October 2, 2024	Vinyl LP	Limited	EMI; Universal Japan	
