= Sandokushi =

Sandokushi 三毒史

Studio album by Ringo Sheena
- Released: May 27, 2019
- Recorded: 2014–2019
- Genre: Pop; rock; jazz; world; electronica
- Length: 43:34
- Language: Japanese; English
- Label: EMI; Universal Japan
- Producer: Ringo Sheena

Ringo Sheena chronology
Gyakuyunyū: Kōkūkyoku (2017)	Sandokushi 三毒史 (2019)	Apple of Universal Gravity (2019)

Singles from Sandokushi
- 1. "Jiyu-Dom" Released: June 11, 2014; 2. "A Life Supreme" Released: January 30, 2015; 3. "God, Nor Buddha" Released: July 31, 2015; 4. "The Main Street" Released: April 20, 2017; 5. "Gate Of Living" Released: April 23, 2019; 6. "Elopers" Released: May 2, 2019; 7. "Off-Line (TOKYO)" Released: May 17, 2019

Sandokushi (三毒史, "The History of the Three Poisons") also known as triviṣa-itihāsa, is the sixth studio album by Japanese musician Ringo Sheena released on May 27, 2019, through EMI Records and Universal Music Japan. Similarly to her previous studio album Hi Izuru Tokoro (2014), the album is a compilation studio album compiling singles released from 2014 to 2019, as well as new compositions.

== Track listing ==
All tracks written and arranged by Ringo Sheena, except where noted.

Credits and track listing adapted from Tidal and Universal Music Japan.

No.	Title	Arrangement	Length
1.	"Gate of Living" (鶏と蛇と豚; Tori to Hebi to Buta)	Ringo Sheena	3:02
2.	"The Narrow Way" (with Hiroji Miyamoto) (獣ゆく細道; Kemono Yuku Hosomichi)	Masanori Sasaji	3:40
3.	"Ego-ism" (マ・シェリ; Ma Chérie)	Neko Saito; Sheena	3:38
4.	"Elopers" (with Atsushi Sakurai) (駆け落ち者; Kakeochi mono)	Sheena	3:05
5.	"To Rock Bottom" (どん底まで; Donzoko Made)	Sheena	2:20
6.	"God, Nor Buddha" (with Shutoku Mukai) (神様、仏様; Kamisama, Hotokesama)	Hidenori Mukai; Youichi Murata; Sheena	3:38
7.	"Off-Line" (TOKYO)	Sheena	3:44
8.	"In Summer, Night" (with Ukigumo) (長く短い祭; Nagaku Mijikai Matsuri)	Murata; Sheena	4:09
9.	"A Life Supreme" (至上の人生; Shijou no Jinsei)	Sheena	4:08
10.	"Victims" (with H Zetto M) (急がば回れ; Isogaba Maware)	Sheena	2:56
11.	"Jiyu-Dom" (ジユーダム)	Saito; Sheena	2:57
12.	"The Main Street" (with Tortoise Matsumoto) (目抜き通り; Menukidoori)	Saito	3:13
13.	"Gate of Hades" (あの世の門; Anoyo no Mon)	Sheena	3:01
Total length:			43:34

== Personnel ==
Musicians

- Ringo Sheena – vocals
- Hiroji Miyamoto – featured vocals (2)
- Atsushi Sakurai – featured vocals (4)
- Shutoku Mukai – featured vocals (6)
- Ukigumo – featured vocals (8), guitar (3, 6, 11), sitar (6), additional vocals (6, 11)
- Masayuki Hiizumi – featured vocals (10), keyboards (5, 6, 10), piano (8), synthesizer (9), wurli (8)
- Tortoise Matsumoto – featured vocals (12)
- Ichiyo Izawa – additional vocals (11), keyboards (11), piano (3)
- Vanya Moneva Choir – background vocals (13)
- Gakutaro Miyauchi – trombone (2)
- Junko Yamashiro – trombone (12)
- Katsuhisa Asari – trombone (2)
- Nobuhide Handa – trombone (2)
- Satoshi Sano – trombone (12)
- Yoichi Murata – trombone (1, 2, 6, 8, 12)
- Yuya Tamura – tuba (1, 13)
- Michiyo Morikawa – flute (2, 3)
- Hideyo Takakuwa – flute (1, 2, 11)
- Takuo Yamamoto – baritone saxophone (2), flute (6), tenor saxophone (6)
- Kei Suzuki – soprano saxophone (2), tenor saxophone (2)
- Masakuni Takeno – soprano saxophone (2), tenor saxophone (2), alto saxophone (12)
- Masato Honda – alto saxophone (2)
- Masato Honma – alto saxophone (2)
- Osamu Yoshida – baritone saxophone (12)
- Ryoji Ihara – tenor saxophone (12)
- Hitomi Niida – trumpet (2)
- Hitoshi Yokoyama – trumpet (12)
- Koji Nishimura – trumpet (1, 6, 8, 12)
- Luis Valle – trumpet (2)
- Masahiko Sugasaka – trumpet (6, 8, 12)
- Sho Okumura – trumpet (2)
- Hirofumi Wada – horn (1)
- Karin Tajima – horn (1)
- Otohiko Fujita – horn (1)
- Tsutomu Isohata – horn (1)
- Tetsuya Cho – bassoon (1)
- Osamu Fukui – bassoon (3)
- Satoko Seki – piccolo (1)
- Satoshi Shoji – cor anglais (1)
- Kanami Araki – oboe (3)
- Masashi Togame – clarinet (1, 3)
- Hideo Yamaki – drums (2)
- Midori Takada – cymbals (1, 13), drums (1), glockenspiel (1, 11–12), percussion (1), snare drums (1), tubular bells (11), vibraphone (11), timpani (12, 13)
- Midorin – drums (4, 5, 7, 10, 12)
- Tom Tamada – drums (6, 8–9)
- Toshiki Hata – drums (3, 11)
- Kazumasa Ohya – cymbals (12), xylophone (12)
- Masato Kawase – percussion (12)
- Mataro – percussion (8)
- Shinji Asakura – percussion (2), timpani (2)
- U-Zhaan – tabla (6)
- Yukio Nagoshi – guitar (4, 5, 9–10)
- Hiro Yamaguchi – bass guitar (9)
- Keisuke Torigoe – bass guitar (4–8, 10, 12–13)
- Seiji Kameda – bass guitar (3, 11)
- Masaki Hayashi – celesta (1), piano (7, 13)
- Masanori Sasaji – piano (2, 12)
- Tomoyuki Asakawa – harp (2, 3)
- Yoshiaki Sato – accordion (13)
- Hidekatsu Onishi – glass harmonica (4)
- DJ Daishizen – sound effects (1)
- Akiko Shimauchi – viola (1)
- Amiko Watabe – viola (1, 3)
- Chikako Nishimura – viola (1)
- Go Tomono – viola (12)
- Hirohito Furugawara – viola (11–12)
- Hyojin Kim – viola (2)
- Manami Tokutaka – viola (12)
- Masaki Shono – viola (2)
- Mayu Takashima – viola (3, 11)
- Misato Futaki – viola (2)
- Sachie Onuma – viola (12)
- Saori Oka – viola (2)
- Yuji Yamada – viola (1)
- Ayaka Jomoto – violin (2)
- Ado Matsumoto – violin (1, 3, 12)
- Akane Irie – violin (1, 3, 12)
- Akiko Maruyama – violin (3, 11, 12)
- Daisuke Yamamoto – violin (1, 12)
- Ayamu Koshikawa – violin (1, 3, 11–12)
- Eriko Ukimura – violin (2)
- Great Eida – violin (1, 3, 11–12)
- Haruko Yano – violin (1, 3, 11–12)
- Hikari Shimada – violin (11–12)
- Jo Kuwata – violin (1, 11–12)
- Hiroki Muto – violin (2)
- Kioki Miki – violin (3)
- Kiyo Kido – violin (2)
- Kojiro Takizawa – violin (1, 3, 11–12)
- Kyoko Ishigame – violin (2)
- Nagisa Kiriyama – violin (11)
- Naoko Ishibashi – violin (2)
- Natsue Kameda – violin (2)
- Osamu Iyoku – violin (2)
- Reina Ushiyama – violin (12)
- Shizuka Kawaguchi – violin (2)
- Syuga Hayashi – violin (2)
- Takayuki Oshikane – violin (12)
- Tatsuo Ogura – violin (1, 3, 11, 12)
- Tonomi Tokunaga – violin (2)
- Ya Manabe – violin (2)
- Yui Kaneko – violin (11)
- Yuki Nakajima – violin (12)
- Yukinori Murata – violin (1, 3)
- Yuri Kamei – violin (2)
- Yuya Yanagihara – violin (2)
- Ayano Kasahara – cello (12)
- Erika Makioka – cello (11)
- Junpei Hayashida – cello (12)
- Masami Horisawa – cello (2)
- Masutami Endo – cello (2)
- Tomoki Tai – cello (2)
- Toshiyuki Muranaka – cello (2)
- Wataru Mukai – cello (1, 12)
- Yoshihiko Maeda – cello (1, 3, 11, 12)
- Yuhki Shinozaki – cello (3)
- Kenji Takamizu – double bass (2)
- Teruhiko Saito – double bass (12)
- Yoshinobu Takeshita – double bass (12)

Production

- Ringo Sheena – arrangement (1, 3–11, 13)
- Masanori Sasaji – arrangement (2)
- Neko Saito – conducting (3, 11, 12), horn arrangement (3, 11), string arrangement (3, 11), rhythm arrangement (11), arrangement (12)
- Youichi Murata – horn arrangement (6, 8)
- Uni Inoue – music production (9)
- Vanya Moneva – choir conducting (13)

== Charts and sales ==
=== Charts ===
Chart	Peak Position
Japan Oricon Weekly Albums Chart	2

=== Sales ===
Chart	Amount
Oricon sales	57,538
