= Carnation (song) =

Single by Ringo Sheena

from the album Hi Izuru Tokoro
- B-side: "Watashi no Aisuru Hito"; "Jinsei wa Omoidōri"
- Released: October 21, 2011
- Recorded: 2011
- Genre: Torch song, waltz, pop
- Length: 3:00
- Label: EMI Music Japan
- Songwriter: Ringo Sheena
- Producer: Ringo Sheena

Ringo Sheena singles chronology
"Ariamaru Tomi" (2009)	"Carnation" (2011)	"Jiyū e Michizure" (2012)

"Carnation" (Japanese: カーネーション, Hepburn: Kānēshon), also known by its French title L'œillet ("The Carnation" in English), is a song by Japanese musician Ringo Sheena. It was released on November 2, 2011, two years after her previous solo single "Ariamaru Tomi" (2009), during a period where she primarily worked with her band Tokyo Jihen. The song was the eponymous theme song for the morning Asadora drama Carnation, starring Machiko Ono.

== Background and development ==
In 2009, Sheena released the solo single "Ariamaru Tomi" and the album Sanmon Gossip after mostly focusing on her band, Tokyo Jihen. Since then, Tokyo Jihen released their fourth studio album, Sports, the single "Sora ga Natteiru" / "Onna no Ko wa Dare Demo" (2011) and their fifth studio album Dai Hakken (2011).

The project began when Shin Yasui, music supervisor for the film Sakuran that Sheena had worked together with, recommended her for the team working on Carnation.

== Writing and production ==
Originally, Sheena was asked to create an upbeat song for the drama. As the drama was set in Kansai, Sheena decided to similarly give the song a Kansai feel, and created the song "Jinsei wa Omoidōri." However, after reading the script and watching the stop-motion sequence Koichiro Tsujikawa created for the opening, she decided an entirely different song with a universal feel would be better suited. This led to the creation of "Carnation."

When she first created the melody, she added a harp backing to the demo. This lead her to ask her frequent collaborator, conductor Neko Saito to work on the song as well. The song was recorded with a 40-person orchestra, led by Saito and concert master Great Eida. Even though she was asked as a soloist to create the theme song, Sheena wanted to include her band Tokyo Jihen in the process. Hence, Sheena invited the members to perform the backing tracks and instruments for the songs on the single. Sheena had wanted the song to be released as a single by the band, however the staff involved with the drama specifically requested the song be under her solo stage name. The lyrics were completed at the very end of the song creating process, after the song arrangement.

The B-side "Jinsei wa Omoidōri," as it was a candidate song to be used in the drama, was inspired by fashion designer Ayako Koshino, the subject of Carnation. Sheena wrote the song about the strength of a mother. The other B-side, "Watashi no Aisuru Hito," was a song Sheena had already thought of before working on the single. She added it to the single as she wanted "a different hook" to those of "Carnation" and "Jinsei wa Omoidōri." "Watashi no Aisuru Hito" was recorded with a 34-person orchestra, and "Jinsei wa Omoidōri" with a team of 11 other than Tokyo Jihen. The B-sides, like "Carnation," were also given French titles by Sheena. "Watashi no Aisuru Hito" became "Mon Amour" ("My Love"), while "Jinsei wa Omoidōri" became "Le monde est à moi" ("The World Is Mine").

== Promotion and release ==
The song was performed three times on television. The first was at Count Down TV on October 29, followed by Music Station on November 11. At the 62nd NHK Kōhaku Uta Gassen on December 31, 2011, Sheena performed "Carnation" in a medley with the Tokyo Jihen song "Onna no Ko wa Dare Demo," along with the other members of Tokyo Jihen.

The song was performed during Tokyo Jihen's 22 date tour Discovery, which was held between September and December in 2010. An instrumental of "Carnation" was performed during Tokyo Jihen's Bon Voyage farewell tour in 2012. During Sheena's Tōtaikai solo concerts in November 2013, Sheena performed the song again.

== Music video ==
The Yuichi Kodama-directed music video was first released on October 21, 2011. It features a starry night motif, where an orchestra performs the song with Sheena. Her Tokyo Jihen band members also make an appearance in the video.

== Critical reception ==
Reception by critics was positive for "Carnation." Takahashi Tomokita from Rockin' On praised the song for its simple and pure melody. CDJournal reviewers agreed, stating that three aspects, the song's "retro world view," Sheena's "whisper-like mysterious voice" and the "calm strings" came together to create a "beautiful waltz." Haruna Takekawa from Hot Express enjoyed the "magnificent orchestra sound" and Sheena's vocals that had the ability to "change expressions" during the song.

== Track listing ==
All tracks are written by Ringo Sheena.

No.	Title	Arranger	Length
1.	"Carnation"	Neko Saito	3:00
2.	"Watashi no Aisuru Hito" (私の愛するひと, "My Love")	Ringo Sheena	3:01
3.	"Jinsei wa Omoidōri" (人生は思い通り, "Life Is How I Want It to Be")	Neko Saito	4:28
Total length:			10:30

== Personnel ==
Personnel details were sourced from "Carnation"'s liner notes booklet.

Tokyo Jihen

- Toshiki Hata – drums
- Ichiyō Izawa – guitar, keyboards, chorus
- Seiji Kameda – bass
- Ringo Sheena – chorus, MIDI, manipulator (#2), songwriting, vocals
- Ukigumo – guitar, chorus

Other performers

- Kōji Akaike – contrabass (#2)
- Toshiki Akiyama – viola (#1)
- Akio Andō – contrabass (#1)
- Yoshihiro Arita – banjo (#3)
- Tomoyuki Asakawa – harp (#1)
- Shin'ichi Eguchi – cello (#2)
- Midori Eida – violin (#1)
- Takahiro Enokido – viola (#2)
- Motoko Fujiie – violin (#2)
- Otohiko Fujita – horn (#1)
- Osamu Fukui – fagotto (#1)
- Great Eida – concert master (#1, #2)
- Aiko Hosokawa – viola (#1)
- Ayako Igarashi – violin (#1)
- Shigeki Ippon – contrabass (#2)
- Akane Irie – violin (#2)
- Naoko Ishibashi – violin (#2)
- Kyoko Ishigame – violin (#2)
- Masahiro Itadaki – violin (#1)
- Tomoki Iwanaga – cello (#2)
- Osamu Iyoku – violin (#2)
- Ayano Kasahara – cello (#2)
- Hiroki Kashiwagi – cello (#2)
- Nagisa Kiriyama – violin (#1, #2)
- Junko Kitayama – horn (#1)
- Hitoshi Konno – violin (#2)
- Ayumu Koshikawa – violin (#1)
- Yoshihiko Maeda – cello (#1)
- Erika Makioka – cello (#1)
- Yu Manabe – violin (#2)
- Mari Masumoto – cello (#2)
- Yuri Matsumoto – viola (#1, #2)
- Kioko Miki – violin (#1)
- Shōko Miki – viola (#1)
- Yasuhiro Morimoto – violin (#2)
- Mariko Muranaka – cello (#1)
- Yoichi Murata – trombone (#3)
- Mayo Nagao – violin (#1)
- Nobuhiko Nakayama – manipulator (#2)
- Yuki Nanjo – violin (#1)
- Kōji Nishimura – trumpet (#3)
- Ayaka Nōtomi – violin (#2)
- Tatsuo Ogura – violin (#1, #2)
- Saori Oka – viola (#2)
- Kuniko Okada – violin (#1)
- Shō Okumura – trombone (#3)
- Sachie Ōnuma – viola (#2)
- Takayuki Oshikane – violin (#1)
- Jun Saitō – contrabass (#1, #2)
- Neko Saito – conductor
- Teruhiko Saitō – contrabass (#1)
- Kimie Shigematsu – clarinet (#1)
- Tomoko Shimaoka – viola (#2)
- Yumi Shimazu – cello (#1)
- Yuhki Shinozaki – cello (#1)
- Koji Shiraishi – clarinet (#3)
- Kon Shirasu – violin (#1)
- Satoshi Shōji – oboe (#1)
- Masahiko Sugasaka – trumpet (#3)
- Ruka Suzuki – viola (#1)
- Tairiku – violin (#2)
- Midori Takada – percussion (#3)
- Kaori Takahashi – violin (#1)
- Hideyo Takakuwa – flute (#1, #3)
- Kōjirō Takizawa – violin (#1)
- Hisami Tamaki – contrabass (#2)
- Takashi Taninaka – contrabass (#1)
- Tomomi Tokunaga – violin (#2)
- Masahiko Tōdō – violin (#2)
- Mao Tomonoh – cello (#1)
- Katsuhiko Toyama – viola (#1)
- Chizuko Tsunoda – violin (#1)
- Amiko Watabe – viola (#2)
- Takuo Yamamoto – tenor saxophone (#3)
- Yuya Yanagihara – violin (#2)
- Osamu Yoshida – alto saxophone (#3)
- Takahiro Yuki – cello (#2)

Technical and production

- Uni Inoue – recording engineer, mixing engineer
- Seiji Itabashi – assistant engineer
- Tomohiro Kaji – piano tuner
- Toshiyuki Kawahito – assistant engineer
- Tadashi Matsumura – instrument technician
- Shigeo Miyamoto – mastering engineer
- Fumio Miyata – musician coordinator
- Hitoshi Ōzeki – instrument technician
- Toshimi Nanseki – additional engineer
- Hiromitsu Takasu – assistant engineer
- Makoto Tanaka – instrument technician
- Teru Tokunaga – assistant engineer

== Charts and sales ==
Chart (2011)	Peak position
Japan Billboard Adult Contemporary Airplay	9
Japan Billboard Japan Hot 100	5
Japan Oricon weekly singles	5
Japan RIAJ Digital Track Chart	38

=== Sales and certifications ===
Chart	Amount
Oricon physical sales	35,000

== Release history ==
Region	Date	Format	Distributing Label	Catalogue codes
Japan	October 3, 2011	Ringtone	EMI Music Japan	
Japan	October 21, 2011	Cellphone download	EMI Music Japan	
France	October 28, 2011	Digital download	EMI Music Japan	
Germany	October 28, 2011	Digital download	EMI Music Japan	
United Kingdom	October 28, 2011	Digital download	EMI Music Japan	
Japan	November 2, 2011	CD, PC download	EMI Music Japan	TOCT-45045
Taiwan	November 4, 2011	CD	Gold Typhoon	I5245
Japan	November 19, 2011	Rental CD	EMI Music Japan	TOCT-45045
South Korea	December 19, 2011	Digital download	Universal Music Korea	
