= Irohanihoheto =

- Digital download cover for "Irohanihoheto" as a single track.

Single by Ringo Sheena

from the album Hi Izuru Tokoro
- Released: April 30, 2013
- Recorded: 2013
- Genre: Pop
- Length: 3:19
- Label: EMI Music Japan
- Songwriter: Ringo Sheena
- Producer: Ringo Sheena

Ringo Sheena singles chronology
"Jiyū e Michizure" (2012)	"Irohanihoheto" (2013)	"Kodoku no Akatsuki" (2013)

"Irohanihoheto" (いろはにほへと), also known by its French title "Les Couleurs Chantent" ("The Colors Sing"), is a song by Japanese musician Ringo Sheena. It was initially released digitally on April 30, 2013, and on May 27 released as one of the A-sides of her 14th single, along with the song "Kodoku no Akatsuki". The release date was the 15th anniversary of the release of Sheena's debut single "Kōfukuron" in 1998. The song was used as the theme song for the drama Kamo, Kyōto e Iku.: Shinise Ryokan no Okami Nikki.

== Background and development ==
In early 2012, Sheena's band Tokyo Jihen disbanded, and released a string of releases, including the extended play Color Bars, the live compilation album Tokyo Collection, the B-side collection Shin'ya Waku, and performed their farewell tour, Bon Voyage. On May 16, 2012, Sheena released her first post-Tokyo Jihen solo work, the digital single "Jiyū e Michizure." This song acted as the theme song for the TBS drama Ataru, starring Masahiro Nakai.

It was later revealed that Sheena was heavily pregnant with her second child during the single's release. As she did not feel it was appropriate to link single promotions with the birth of a child, she waited until her Tōtaikai concerts in November to reveal this.

== Writing and production ==
Sheena worked together with producer and guitarist Yukio Nagoshi on the song, as well as "Kodoku no Akatsuki". Sheena had previously worked with Nagoshi during her Ringo Expo concerts in 2008, and on the songs "Zero Chiten Kara," "Togatta Teguchi" and "Yokyō" on her solo album Sanmon Gossip (2009). Her previous Tokyo Jihen bandmate Ichiyo Izawa played the harpsichord on "Irohanihoheto." Bassist Hitoshi Watanabe had previously worked with Sheena as a member of Bōtoku Vitamin, one of the bands who performed on her album Utaite Myōri: Sono Ichi (2002). Drummer Noriyasu Kawamura previously worked with Sheena on her debut album Muzai Moratorium (1999).

"Irohanihoheto" is the first line of the Heian era Iroha poem, a poem which includes each kana syllable once. Sheena wrote the song after reading the script for Kamo, Kyōto e Iku.: Shinise Ryokan no Okami Nikki, the Fuji Television drama series she was asked to write a theme song for. She wanted to express the philosophy of being a mother.

== Promotion and release ==
"Irohanihoheto" was used as the theme song for the Fuji Television drama Kamo, Kyōto e Iku.: Shinise Ryokan no Okami Nikki. As such, it was used during the broadcast of the drama, as well as in promotional works such as commercials for the drama. During Sheena's Tōtaikai concerts in November 2013, Sheena performed "Irohanihoheto" live for the first time.

During the initial digital release, the song was given the French title "Couleurs Perfum" before being retitled "Les Couleurs Chantent".

== Music video ==
The Yuichi Kodama-directed music video was released on May 9, 2013. It features Sheena walking through a bamboo forest, wearing a light purple kimono. As she walks by, she walks past a procession of people wearing fox masks and traditional clothing. The video ends as she reaches a sunny spot in the forest, donning on her umbrella as rain begins to pour.

The video was nominated at the 2014 MTV Video Music Awards Japan for the Best Female Video award.

== Critical reception ==
Critical reception to the single was positive. OK Music reviewers felt "Irohanihoheto" had a catchy "1970s kayōkyoku-like melody" CDJournal reviewers felt that the song's rhythm and "air of impurity" resembled her 1998 single "Kabukichō no Joō", however the harpsichord and sitar gave the song an "oriental color". Billboard Japan reviewer Haruna Takekawa felt the song had a strong image of Kyoto, matching the drama. She believed the song was written about the "strength and beauty of women, and the impermanence of humanity." Rockin' On reviewer Daisuke Koyanagi felt that the song had a "simple kayōkyoku structure" that was completely different to her strong aesthetic sense in previous releases, and instead believed it was the song, not the arrangement, that was prominent. He theorised it was an attempt to go back to basics, and believed the song's introduction was intentionally similar to "Kabukichō no Joō".

== Track listings ==
All music is composed by Ringo Sheena.

Digital download
No.	Title	Lyrics	Arranger	Length
1.	"Irohanihoheto"	Ringo Sheena	R. Sheena	3:19
Total length:				3:19

All music is composed by Ringo Sheena.

Full-length single
No.	Title	Lyrics	Arranger	Length
1.	"Irohanihoheto"	R. Sheena	R. Sheena	3:19
2.	"Kodoku no Akatsuki"	Aya Watanabe	R. Sheena	3:04
Total length:				6:24

== Personnel ==
Personnel details were sourced from "Irohanihoheto/Kodoku no Akatsuki"'s liner notes booklet.

Performers and musicians

- Masato Abe – cello
- Great Eida – concertmaster
- Hirohito Furugawara – viola
- Shigeki Ippon – contrabass
- Akane Irie – violin
- Ichiyo Izawa – harpsichord
- Yuri Kaji – viola
- Ayano Kasahara – cello
- Tsukasa Kasuya – violin
- Noriyasu Kawamura – drums
- Nagisa Kiriyama – violin
- Takashi Konno – contrabass
- Ayumu Koshikawa – violin
- Minoru Kuwata – violin
- Erika Makioka – cello
- Yoshihiko Maeda – cello
- Kioko Miki – violin
- Shōko Miki – viola
- Mariko Muranaka – cello
- Yukio Nagoshi – guitars, electric sitar
- Yuki Nanjo – violin
- Tatsuo Ogura – violin
- Sachie Ōnuma – viola
- Takayuki Oshikane – violin
- Neko Saito – strings and percussion arrangement, conducting
- Teruhiko Saitō – contrabass
- Ringo Sheena – vocals, chorus, songwriting
- Midori Takada – percussion
- Kōjirō Takizawa – violin
- Takashi Taninaka – contrabass
- Seigen Tokuzawa – cello
- Chizuko Tsunoda – violin
- Leina Ushiyama – violin
- Amiko Watabe – viola
- Hitoshi Watanabe – bass
- Yuji Yamada – viola
- Daisuke Yamamoto – violin
- Haruko Yano – violin
- Tomoko Yokota – violin

Technical and production

- Uni Inoue – recording engineer, mixing engineer
- Shohei Kojima – assistant engineer
- Kozo Miyamoto – assistant engineer
- Shigeo Miyamoto – mastering engineer
- Fumio Miyata – musician coordinator
- Hiroshi Satō – assistant engineer
- Yuji Tanaka – instrument technician

== Charts and sales ==
Chart (2013)	Peak position
Japan Billboard Adult Contemporary Airplay	1
Japan Billboard Japan Hot 100	4
Japan Billboard yearly Japan Hot 100	87
Japan Oricon weekly singles: "Irohanihoheto/Kodoku no Akatsuki"	8

=== Sales ===
Chart	Amount
Oricon physical sales: "Irohanihoheto/Kodoku no Akatsuki"	25,000

== Release history ==
Region	Date	Format	Distributing Label	Catalogue codes
Japan	April 16, 2013	Ringtone	EMI Records Japan	
Japan	April 30, 2013	Cellphone download, PC download	EMI Records Japan	
Japan	May 27, 2013	CD, rental CD, Full EP digital download	EMI Records Japan	TOCT-40420
Taiwan	May 31, 2013	CD	Gold Typhoon	I5321
