= Saihate ga Mitai =

2014 song by Sayuri Ishikawa

Song by Sayuri Ishikawa

from the album X -Cross II-
- Language: Japanese
- Released: April 23, 2014 (Japan)
- Recorded: March 2014
- Length: 3:50
- Label: Teichiku Records
- Songwriter: Ringo Sheena

X -Cross II- track listing
- 1. An’ya no Shinjūtate; 2. Eikyū ni FOREVER; 3. Ame no Blues; 4. Ra.n.se; 5. Sora wo Miagerutoki; 6. Sennen Tōbō; 7. Kokoro no Iro; 8. Naute no Dorobōneko; 9. Saihate ga Mitai

"Saihate ga Mitai"

Single by Ringo Sheena
- Released: May 13, 2015
- Recorded: 2015
- Length: 3:46
- Label: EMI Music Japan
- Songwriter: Ringo Sheena

Ringo Sheena singles chronology
"Shijō no Jinsei" (2015)	"Saihate ga Mitai" (2015)	"Nagaku Mijikai Matsuri/Kamisama, Hotokesama" (2015)

"Saihate ga Mitai" (Japanese: 最果てが見たい; "I Want to See the Very End"), also known by its Spanish title "¿Dónde quiere estar mi alma viajero?, is a song by Japanese enka singer Sayuri Ishikawa, and digital download single by Japanese singer-songwriter Ringo Sheena.

== Background and development ==
The song is written by Ringo Sheena and was recorded in Sayuri Ishikawa's album "X -Cross II-" released on April 23, 2014 from Teichiku Records. Sheena covered the song for herself later and released it as a digital download single on May 13, 2015 from EMI Records.

Ishikawa's version was used as the advertising jingle of the snack food "Cheeza" of Ezaki Glico. Sheena's version was used as the theme song for the anime film "Miss Hokusai" and was released worldwide following a schedule adjusted to the world release of the film.

== Track listing ==
All tracks are written by Ringo Sheena.

Ishikawa version
No.	Title	Arranger	Length
1.	"Saihate ga Mitai"	Masaki Hayashi	03:50

Sheena version
No.	Title	Arranger	Length
1.	"Saihate ga Mitai"	Ringo Sheena	03:46

== Personnel ==
Ishikawa version

- piano: Masaki Hayashi
- accordion: Yoshiaki Sato
- quena: Hikaru Iwakawa
