= Going Under Ground =

Japanese band

- Also known as: Going
- Origin: Okegawa, Saitama, Japan
- Genres: Rock, alternative rock, pop rock, emo (early)
- Years active: 1991–present
- Labels: DNA Capsules, John?, Sunnyside, Victor Entertainment, Pony Canyon
- Members: Matsumoto Sou; Nakazawa Hiroki; Ishihara Satoshi
- Past members: Itoh Yoichi; Kohno Takehiro
- Website: Going Under Ground official website

Going Under Ground (ゴーイング・アンダー・グラウンド) are a Japanese alternative rock band, formed in Okegawa, Saitama, 1991. Sometimes referred to as just "Going", they got their name from the British hit single, "Going Underground" by The Jam.

== Members ==
- Matsumoto Sou – lead vocals, guitar
- Nakazawa Hiroki – guitar, backing and lead vocals
- Ishihara Satoshi – bass, backing vocals

== Past members ==
- Itoh Yoichi – keyboards, percussion (left in 2009)
- Kohno Takehiro – drums, percussion, guitar, violin (left in 2014)

== Discography ==
=== Studio albums ===
- GOING UNDER GROUND (May 24, 2000, re-released on May 7, 2003 as enhanced CD with bonus tracks)
- Kayowaki Energy (かよわきエナジー, "Feeble Energy", October 24, 2001)
- Home (ホーム, September 11, 2002)
- Heartbeat (ハートビート, October 22, 2003)
- h.o.p.s. (February 9, 2005)
- TUTTI (February 22, 2006)
- Oyasumi Monster (おやすみモンスター, "Goodnight Monster", December 7, 2007)
- LUCKY STAR (March 4, 2009)
- Inagawa-Kun (稲川くん, April 27, 2011)
- Roots & Routes (November 14, 2012)
- Hitoribocchi ni Naru Hi no Tame ni (ひとりぼっちになる日のために, "For a Day to Be All Alone", March 5, 2014)
- Out of Blue (August 24, 2016)
- Manatsu no Mokugekisha (真夏の目撃者, "Witness in Midsummer", October 25, 2017)
- FILMS (September 19, 2018)
- Atarashii Tomodachi (あたらしいともだち, "New Friends", March 19, 2022)

=== Mini albums ===
- Cello (December 12, 1998)
- Shishunki no Blues (思春期のブルース, "Puberty Blues", September 23, 1999)

=== Compilations ===
- BEST OF GOING UNDER GROUND with YOU (June 28, 2006)
- COMPLETE SINGLE COLLECTION 1998–2008 (May 21, 2008)
- THE BOX (December 24, 2014)
- ALL TIME BEST ~20th STORY + LOVE + SONG~ (December 12, 2018)

=== Singles ===
- Sakura ga Saitara (桜が咲いたら, "When the Cherry Blossoms Bloom", April 21, 2000)
- Romantic Kaidō (ロマンチック街道, Romantic City Street", September 3, 2000)
- Arrow (アロー, March 10, 2001)
- Graffiti (グラフティー, June 21, 2001)
- Sentiment Express (センチメント・エキスプレス, September 19, 2001)
- Mirage (ミラージュ, April 27, 2002)
- Rumble (ランブル, July 10, 2002)
- Diary (ダイアリー, May 7, 2003)
- Twilight (トワイライト, September 24, 2003)
- Heartbeat (ハートビート, January 21, 2004)
- Thank You (サンキュー, September 22, 2004)
- Onaji Tsuki wo Miteta (同じ月を見てた, "We Were Looking at the Same Moon", December 8, 2004)
- Ageha (アゲハ, "Swallowtail", February 9, 2005)
- STAND BY ME (May 18, 2005)
- Kirari/Tomorrow's Song (きらり／トゥモロウズ ソング, "Twinkle/Tomorrow's Song", August 17, 2005)
- Happy Birthday (February 1, 2005)
- VISTA/Humming Life (VISTA／ハミングライフ, May 3, 2006)
- Mune Ippai (胸いっぱい, "Heartful", March 21, 2007)
- TWISTER (June 13, 2007)
- Sakasama World (さかさまワールド, "Upside Down World", October 17, 2007)
- Hatsukoi (初恋, "First Love", March 19, 2008)
- Issho ni Kaerou (いっしょに帰ろう, "Let's Go Home with Me", January 21, 2009)
- Listen to the Stereo!! (Opening theme for the anime Katekyo Hitman Reborn!", May 19, 2010)
- LONG WAY TO GO (November 23, 2010)
- Ai nante (愛なんて, "Such Thing as Love", November 2, 2011)
- Naraba Seishun no Hikari (ならば青春の光, "Then I Call it the Light of the Youth", November 9, 2013)
- Mou Yume ha Minai Koto ni Shita/Soul train (もう夢は見ないことにした／Soul train, "I Decided Not to Dream Anymore/Soul train", September 18, 2015)
- the band (May 11, 2016)
- Choshinsei/Yosomono (超新星／よそもの, "Supernova/Outsider", May 24, 2017)
- Sweet Temptation (スウィートテンプテーション, June 6, 2018)
- Bakuon no Shihanseiki ep (爆音ノ四半世紀ep, "Quarter Century on Blasted Sound ep", June 16, 2024)

=== DVD ===
- every breath (March 24, 2004)
- GOING UNDER GROUND TOUR TUTTI at BUDOKAN (October 25, 2006)
- Tour 2008-2009 “LUCKY STAR” FINAL LIVE at Hibiya (September 1, 2009)
- GOING UNDER GROUND Fuyu no HALL TOUR Furusato Live ~ARAKAWA WATARE vol.3~ at Hibikinomori/Okegawa City Arts Theater (March 1, 2013)
- GOING UNDER GROUND TOUR 2013-14 “Naraba Seishun no Hikari” Furusato Live ~ARAKAWA WATARE vol.4~ at Hibikinomori/Okegawa City Arts Theater (January 19, 2014)
- GOING UNDER GROUND TOUR “OReTABI 2014-15” LIVE at Shibuya Public Hall “Kohno, Bando Yamerutteyo” (May 16, 2015)
- Documentary Film “the band ~Kiroku to Kioku~” (September 19, 2016)

== Song use in media ==
- Their song, "VISTA", is featured in the 2007 Nintendo DS game Moero! Nekketsu Rhythm Damashii Osu! Tatakae! Ouendan 2.
- Their song, "Listen to the Stereo!!", is used as the eighth opening theme song for the anime "Katekyo Hitman Reborn!"
- Their song, "Title", was used as official theme song for 2007 F. League, however it is also featured in the Nintendo DS game Nippon Futsal League Kounin: Minna no DS Futsal (released on July 24, 2008)
- Their song, "Breakthrough", is used as the thirteenth opening song for the anime "Fairy Tail"
