= Ukina =

Compilation album by Ringo Sheena
- Released: November 13, 2013
- Recorded: 1998–2012
- Genre: Alternative rock, indie rock, jazz, electronic music, pop
- Length: 1:03:13
- Language: Japanese, English
- Label: EMI Records Japan
- Producer: Ringo Sheena

Ringo Sheena chronology
Saturday Night Gossip (2009)	Ukina (2013)	Gyakuyunyū: Kōwankyoku (2014)

Singles from Ukina
- 1. "Between Today and Tomorrow" Released: January 7, 2012; 2. "Koroshiya Kiki Ippatsu" Released: June 26, 2013; 3. "It Was You" Released: November 13, 2013; 4. "Netsuai Hakkakuchū" Released: November 13, 2013

Ukina (浮き名; "Scandal"), also known by its English name Talk of the Town, is a compilation album by Japanese musician Ringo Sheena. It was released on her 15th anniversary on November 13, 2013, by Universal Music Japan sublabel EMI Records Japan, alongside a live recording compilation album called Mitsugetsu-shō. The album compiles her collaborations with other musicians not released on a Ringo Sheena album, as well as two unpublished songs.

== Background and development ==
Ukina was released as a part of Ringo Sheena's 15th anniversary celebrations. Sheena previously celebrated her 5th and 10th anniversaries: for her 5th anniversary in 2003, she held the Sugoroku Ecstasy tour and released her "Ringo no Uta" single. For her 10th in 2008, she released the B-side compilation album Watashi to Hōden, performed the Ringo Expo 08 series of concerts and released the Mora album box set.

Ukina was released alongside Mitsugetsu-shō, an album compiling songs from different live concerts. Also released on that on November 13 were The Sexual Healing Total Care Course 120min. and Live, two box sets compiling all of her visual media. Many of her previous live DVDs were also re-released on Blu-ray on the same day: Gekokujō Xstasy (2000), Hatsuiku Status: Gokiritsu Japon (2000), Baishō Ecstasy (2003), Electric Mole (2003), Zazen Extasy (2008) and Ringo Expo 08 (2009).

== Writing and production ==
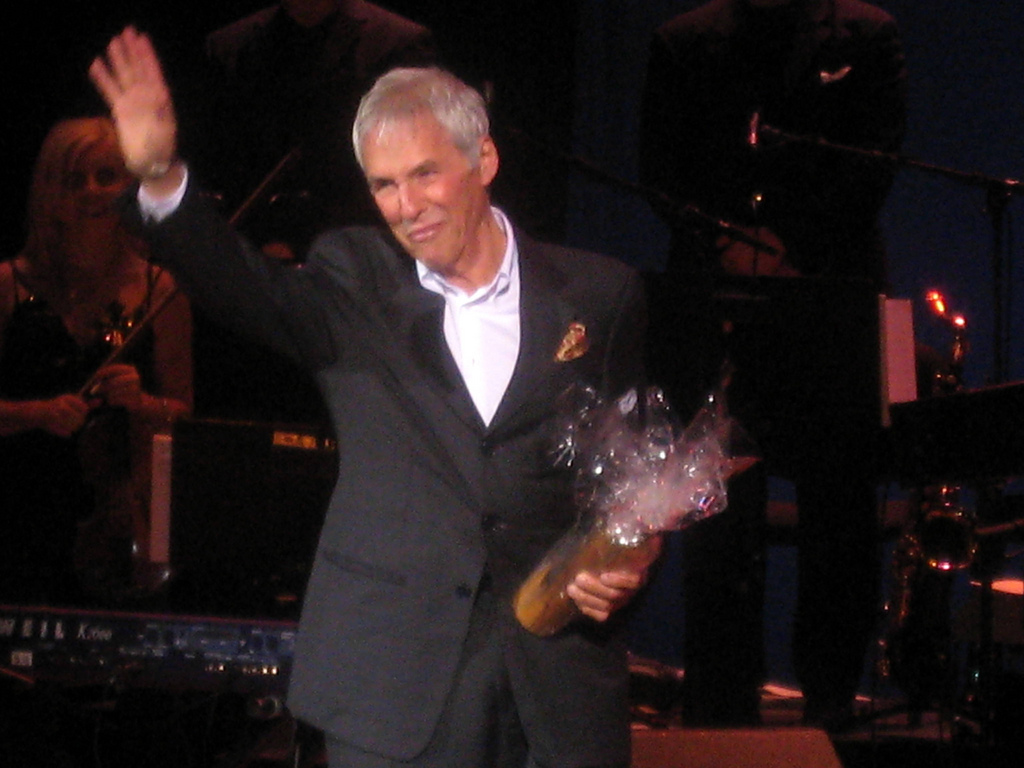
American composer Burt Bacharach composed one of the two new songs on Ukina.

The songs "Becoming" and "Rock & Hammer" were originally on Takashi Taniguchi's 1998 album Becoming. "Crazy Days Crazy Feeling" and "You Make Me Feel So Bad" were two of three songs Sheena sung in the chorus on Zazen Boys' album Zazen Boys II (2004), along with "Anminbō" (安眠棒; "Stick of Peaceful Sleep") which does not feature on Ukina. "Rockin' Luuula" was a song from Mo'some Tonebender's album Rockin' Luuula (2005), in which Sheena sung chorus and played the piano. Sheena also performed the kazoo on the song "Mashed Potato Boogie" (マッシュポテト・ブギー, Masshupoteto Bugī), also featured on Rockin' Luuula. For Blankey Jet City vocalist Kenichi Asai's 2006 debut single "Kiken Sugiru," Sheena performed chorus work. It was later featured on his album Johnny Hell (2006).

"Amai Yamai" was collaboration with hip-hop group Maboroshi on their 2009 album Maboroshi no Shi. Two versions of Sheena's collaboration with Soil & "Pimp" Sessions, "My Foolish Heart," are featured on Ukina. The "Crazy on Earth" version was featured on their album 6 (2009), and the "Crazy in Shibuya" version was released as a digital download on September 30, 2009. "Kirakira Bushi" was a 2011 pseudonymous collaboration with Takafumi Ikeda's solo-project Rekishi, using the name Deyonna.

Many of the other collaborations were from 2013. "Koroshiya Kiki Ippatsu" was another collaboration with Soil & "Pimp" Sessions, which was released as a single, reaching number 14 on Oricon single charts. It featured on their album Circles. Further collaborations included "Apple" on Towa Tei's Lucky (2013) and "Yasashii Tetsugaku" on Tomita Lab's album Joyous. Sheena was also featured as a vocalist on two other songs from Lucky: "Tokai no Yoru, Watashi no Machi" (都会の夜 わたしの街; "Urban Night, My Town") which also featured Yuko Hara, Ken Yokoyama, and Yu Sakai, and the leading promotional track "Kono Yo wa Fushigi" (この世は不思議; "This World Is Mysterious"), which also featuredYuko Hara, Ken Yokoyama, and Yu Sakai.

"Between Today and Tomorrow" is an instrumental track Sheena wrote for the film Kyō to Ashita no Aida ni, a documentary on ballet artist Yasuyuki Shuto. She worked on the track with Neko Saito and his quartet. It was released as a digital single on January 7, 2012.

Two previously unreleased songs were featured on the album. "It Was You" was a ballad written by Burt Bacharach. It was first performed at the Rising Sun Rock Festival in Otaru, Hokkaido on August 16, 2008, but otherwise was unreleased. Sheena performed the song together with the Neko Saito Quartet, and they are credited as the collaborating artist on Ukina. "Netsuai Hakkakuchū" was a song Sheena wrote especially for Ukina, which she asked electronic musician Yasutaka Nakata to arrange for her.

== Promotion and release ==
A music video was released for "It Was You" on November 1, 2013, featuring Sheena performing the song with the Neko Saito Quartet.

A music video for "Netsuai Hakkakuchū" was also produced for the album. A short version which was uploaded in early November reached 100,000 views in three days. The full version was released in full on November 13, 2013. The music video features Sheena playing two characters: Rinnko (RINN子), who is killed by overzealous paparazzi, and Linnko (LINN子), who attacks the paparazzi. Linnko wears a black leather mini-dress while she attacks the men. The video also features dance scenes with both Rinnko and Linnko, alongside dance crew Idevian Crew. It was Sheena's first time attempting dance and action scenes.

On November 13, both "Netsuai Hakkakuchū" and "It Was You" were released on iTunes as digital singles, instead of the entire album being released. "Netsuai Hakkakuchū" was given the French title "J'ai trouvé l'amour" (meaning "I Have Found Love" in English). On November 15, Sheena performed "Netsuai Hakkakuchū" live at Music Station. The song peaked at number 18 on the Billboard Japan Hot 100 chart after the album's release.

Several days after the album's release, Sheena held a series of concerts at the Orchard Hall in Tokyo called Tōtaikai: Heisei Nijūgo-nen Kaneyama-chō Taikai (党大会 平成二十五年神山町大会; "The Party Convention: 2013 Kamiyama Event") on November 18, 19, 20, 25 and 26. Two additional concerts for Sheena's fanclub called Hantaikai: Heisei Nijūgo-nen Hamarikyū Taikai (班大会 平成二十五年浜離宮大会; "The Squad Convention: 2013 Hamarikyū Event") were held on November 28 and 29 at the Hamarikyu Asahi Hall in Tokyo. The November 29 concert was broadcast simultaneously on website Livespire, as well as at 80 movie theaters across Japan.

== Chart reception ==
The album debuted at number 5 on Oricon's albums chart, selling 21,000 copies. After charting in the top 300 for eight weeks, the album sold a total of 35,000 copies. In Taiwan, where the album was re-titled Yùnshì (韻事, "Affair"), it reached number 10 on the East Asian subchart of G-Music in December.

== Critical reception ==
Critical reception was positive for Ukina. Both CDJournal reviewers and Sayako Oki from Skream! felt Sheena's presence was felt strongly in the songs for Ukina. CDJournal praised "Netsuai Hakkakuchū," feeling that it "resonated now" and that it "took the leadership." Oki believed that even though the songs were originally from different projects, the order that Sheena had created made them work well as a cohesive album.

== Track listing ==
No.	Title	Lyrics	Music	Producer(s)	Length
1.	"Yasashii Tetsugaku" (やさしい哲学 "Kind Philosophy;" performed by Tomita Lab featuring Ringo Sheena)	Sheena	Keiichi Tomita	Tomita	4:59
2.	"Crazy Days Crazy Feeling" (performed by Zazen Boys)	Shutoku Mukai	Mukai	Mukai	3:52
3.	"Rockin' Luuula" (ロッキンルーラ Rokkin Rūra; performed by Mo'some Tonebender)	Kazuhiro Momo	Momo	Mo'some Tonebender	2:56
4.	"It Was You" (performed by Sheena and the Neko Saito Quartet)	Burt Bacharach; Tonio K	Bacharach; Tonio K		3:53
5.	"Rock & Hammer" (performed by Takashi Taniguchi)	Taniguchi	Taniguchi	Neonpark	4:33
6.	"You Make Me Feel So Bad" (performed by Zazen Boys)	Mukai	Mukai	Mukai	3:02
7.	"Netsuai Hakkakuchū" (熱愛発覚中 "Detecting Love;" performed by Sheena and Yasutaka Nakata)	Sheena	Sheena	Nakata	3:29
8.	"My Foolish Heart (Crazy on Earth)" (performed by Soil & "Pimp" Sessions and Sheena)	Sheena	Jōsei; Motoharu	Soil & "Pimp" Sessions; Sheena	4:17
9.	"Amai Yamai" (あまいやまい "Sweet Sickness;" performed by Maboroshi featuring Sheena)	Daisuke Sakama; Sheena	Maboroshi; Sheena	Maboroshi	4:04
10.	"Kiken Sugiru" (危険すぎる "Too Dangerous;" performed by Ken'ichi Asai)	Asai	Asai	Asai	3:54
11.	"Becoming" (performed by Taniguchi)	Taniguchi	Taniguchi; Yuki Katsuya	Taniguchi; Nobuyuki Ogino	4:54
12.	"Kirakira Bushi" (きらきら武士 "Shining Samurai," performed by Rekishi featuring Deyonná)	Takafumi Ikeda	Ikeda	Ikeda	4:06
13.	"Koroshiya Kiki Ippatsu" (performed by Soil & "Pimp" Sessions and Sheena)	Sheena	Sheena; Tabu Zombie	Saito	2:33
14.	"Apple" (performed by Towa Tei and Sheena)	Tei	Tei	Tei	3:54
15.	"Between Today and Tomorrow" (performed by Sheena and the Neko Saito Quartet)		Sheena	Sheena	4:01
16.	"My Foolish Heart (Crazy in Shibuya)" (bonus track; performed by Soil & "Pimp" Sessions and Sheena)	Sheena	Jōsei; Motoharu	Soil & "Pimp" Sessions; Sheena	4:39
Total length:					63:13

== Charts ==
=== Charts ===
Chart (2013)	Peak position
Japan Oricon daily albums	2
Japan Oricon weekly albums	5
Japan Oricon monthly albums	16
Taiwan G-Music East Asian weekly releases	10

=== Sales and certifications ===
Chart	Amount
Oricon physical sales	35,000

=== Year-end charts ===
Chart (2013)	Peak position
Japan Oricon yearly albums	195

== Release history ==
Region	Date	Format	Distributing Label	Catalogue codes
Japan	November 13, 2013	CD	EMI Records Japan	TYCT-69005, TYCT-6000
Japan	November 30, 2013	Rental CD	EMI Records Japan	TYCT-69005, TYCT-6000
Hong Kong	December 12, 2013	CD	Universal	0635445
Taiwan	December 13, 2013	CD	Universal	0635445
