= Jiyū e Michizure =

Single by Ringo Sheena

from the album Hi Izuru Tokoro
- Released: May 16, 2012
- Genre: Pop-rock
- Length: 3:33
- Label: EMI Music Japan
- Songwriter: Ringo Sheena

Ringo Sheena singles chronology
"Carnation" (2011)	"Jiyū e Michizure" (2012)	"Irohanihoheto" (2013)

Music video
- "Jiyū e Michizure" at YouTube

"Jiyū e Michizure" (自由へ道連れ; "Traveling Companion to Freedom") (official English title: Collateral Damage) is Japanese singer-songwriter Ringo Sheena's digital single (the 17th single overall), released on May 16, 2012. The song is featured as the theme song for the Japanese television drama Ataru. "Jiyū e Michizure" reached number one in iTunes Store charts, peaked at 5 on the Japan Hot 100, and at 7 on the RIAJ Digital Track Chart. It was certified gold for 100,000 copies downloaded to computers in 2013.

Sheena wrote the song at the request of the TV program's staff.

== Music video ==
The music video for "Jiyū e Michizure" was directed by Yasuyuki Ozeki. Sheena didn’t appear on the music video, and Nana Komatsu starred in the video instead.

== Track listing ==
No.	Title	Writer(s)	Length
1.	"Jiyū e Michizure"	Ringo Sheena	3:33

== Charts ==
Chart (2012)	Peak position
Japan Billboard Adult Contemporary Airplay	7
Japan Billboard Japan Hot 100	5
Japan RIAJ Digital Track Chart	7

== Certifications ==
Chart	Amount
RIAJ PC download certification	Gold (100,000)

== Personnel ==
Personnel details were sourced from Hi Izuru Tokoro's liner notes booklet.

- Hayashi (from Polysics) – guitars
- Satoshi Ishihara (from Going Under Ground) – bass guitar
- Makoto Sakurai (from Dragon Ash) – drums
- Ringo Sheena – arrangement, songwriting, vocals
