= Ariamaru Tomi =

Single by Shiina Ringo

from the album Hi Izuru Tokoro
- Released: May 27, 2009
- Length: 10:09 minutes
- Label: EMI Music Japan / Virgin Music
- Songwriters: Shiina Ringo, Tomotaka Imamichi, Jazztronik
- Producer: Uni Inoue

Shiina Ringo singles chronology
"Kono Yo no Kagiri" (2007)	"Ariamaru Tomi" (2009)	"Carnation" (2011)

"Ariamaru Tomi" (ありあまる富, The Invaluable) was Japanese singer Shiina Ringo's first single as a solo artist in five years. It was released on May 27, 2009, the same day her debut single was released eleven years earlier. The distributor is EMI Music Japan / Virgin Music.

It is featured in the 2024 video game Like a Dragon: Infinite Wealth as the ending theme.

== Outline ==
The single was her first in two and a half years as Shiina Ringo, and her first single in five years as a solo artist. "Ariamaru Tomi" is the theme song for the TV drama Smile of TBS. Shiina wrote this song at the request of the drama director. It was the first time that she had performed for a TV drama as a solo singer.

"Ariamaru Tomi" is not contained in Shiina's 4th studio album Sanmon Gossip released on June 24, 2009. However, "SG～Superficial Gossip～" is contained in the vinyl record Saturday Night Gossip (released on August 26, 2009) and "Ariamaru Tomi" was eventually released in her album Hi Izuru Tokoro (released November 5, 2014).

The song was performed live by Shiina as a part of her band Tokyo Jihen at their appearance at the Countdown Japan festival in 2009, and during the band's Ultra C tour in 2010.

== Track listing ==
All lyrics are written by Shiina Ringo; all music is composed by Shiina Ringo and additional music by Tomotaka Imamichi. #1 arranged by Tomotaka Imamichi, #2 arranged by Ryota Nozaki/Jazztronik.

No.	Title	Length
1.	"Ariamaru Tomi (ありあまる富, The Invaluable)"	5:41
2.	"SG～Superficial Gossip～"	4:21
Total length:		10:01

== Chart and sales ==
Chart (2009)	Peak position
Japan Billboard Adult Contemporary Airplay	14
Japan Billboard Japan Hot 100	5
Japan Oricon weekly singles	3
Japan RIAJ Digital Track Chart	7
Taiwan G-Music East Asian Releases	13

=== Sales and certifications ===
Chart	Amount
Oricon physical sales	75,000
RIAJ physical certification	Gold (100,000)
RIAJ cellphone download certification	Gold (100,000)
RIAJ PC download certification	Gold (100,000)

== Personnel ==
Personnel details were sourced from "Ariamaru Tomi"'s liner notes booklet.

Performers and musicians

- Kenta Arai – bass guitar (#1)
- Tomotaka Imamichi – guitars (#1)
- Naoto Strings – strings (#2)
- Noriyasu "Kāsuke" Kawamura – drums (#1)
- Ryota Nozaki (Jazztronik) – all other instruments (#2)
- Shiina Ringo – vocals
- Suginami Junior Chorus – chorus (#1)

Technical and production

- Ryota Nozaki (Jazztronik) – string arrangement (#2)
- Shiina Ringo – arrangement, songwriting
