= Midori Takada =

Midori Takada 高田みどり
- Born: Midori Takada (高田みどり); Tokyo, Japan
- Genres: Ambient; minimal
- Occupations: Composer; Percussionist
- Instruments: Percussion; Marimba; Gong; Harmonium; Bells; Ocarina; Vibraphone; Piano
- Years active: 1983–present
- Labels: RCA; CBS/Sony; Epic; WRWTFWW Records; Palto Flats; !K7

Midori Takada (Japanese: 高田みどり) (born December 21, 1951) is a Japanese composer and percussionist. She has been described as a pioneer of ambient and minimalist music.

== Early career and Mkwaju Ensemble ==
Takada graduated from Tokyo University of the Arts and began her musical career as a percussionist with the Berlin RIAS Symphonie-Orchester in the mid-1970s. She became dissatisfied with the Western classical musical tradition and returned to Japan to study African drumming and Indonesian gamelan, as well as the early minimalism of Steve Reich and Terry Riley. She channeled these influences into the group Mkwaju Ensemble which she formed with Joe Hisaishi, Yoji Sadanari, Junko Arase and Hideki Matsutake. Mkwaju Ensemble released two albums in 1981, Mkwaju and Ki-Motion, and she also performed on recordings by Tōru Takemitsu and Satoshi Ashikawa around this time.

== Through The Looking Glass ==
Takada recorded her first solo LP Through The Looking Glass in three days in early 1983. She performs all parts on the album, with diverse instrumentation including percussion, marimba, gong, reed organ, bells, ocarina, vibraphone, piano and glass Coca-Cola bottles. The album was not commercially popular upon release, but became a collector's item in the late 2010s thanks to online sharing through YouTube and other sites. The album was reissued on vinyl and CD in 2017 and has been hailed as "mesmerizing" and an "ambient minimalist masterpiece". Pitchfork awarded the album 'Best new reissue' and it became the second best-selling release of 2017 on Discogs.

== Further collaborations, Tree of Life and recent career ==
Throughout the 1980s and 1990s Takada performed in various ensembles, composed for theater director Tadashi Suzuki and taught at various universities in Tokyo. She also performed with the improvisational group Ton-Klami and collaborated with pianist Masahiko Satoh (Lunar Cruise) and Ghanese percussionist Kakraba Lobi (African Percussion Meeting), but did not record another solo album until Tree of Life in 1999.

There was a resurgence of interest in Takada's work following the reissue of Through The Looking Glass and she has since performed extensively across Europe, the United States, Australia, Israel and Japan. She also recorded two new collaborative releases, Le Renard Bleu with electronic artist Lafawndah and An Eternal Moment with saxophonist Kang Tae Hwan.

In 2020, Takada was approached by filmmaker Otto Bell who wanted to use Through The Looking Glass as the soundtrack for his documentary, The Toxic Pigs of Fukushima. Takada instead decided to compose a new original score which she performs for the film.

== Discography ==
- Through The Looking Glass (1983)
- Nebula (1987), with Mayumi Miyata
- Lunar Cruise (1990), with Masahiko Satoh
- Tree of Life (1999)
- Le Renard Bleu (2018), with Lafawndah
- An Eternal Moment (2019), with Kang Tae Hwan
- あなたに出会うまで / Until I Met You (2025), with Jakob Bro

== Theatrical work ==
- Musical performance in Electra, directed by Tadashi Suzuki and Satoshi Miyagi, first performed in 1996, ACM Theatre, Art Tower Mito, Japan
- Musical performance in King Lear, directed by Tadashi Suzuki.

== Film Score ==
- The Toxic Pigs of Fukushima, 2020
