= EMI Records Japan =

Defunct Japanese record label

- Parent company: Universal Music Japan
- Founded: April 1, 2013; 13 years ago
- Defunct: April 1, 2014; 12 years ago
- Status: Defunct
- Distributor: Universal Music Group
- Genre: Various
- Country of origin: Japan

EMI Records Japan (Japanese: EMIレコーズ・ジャパン) was a Japanese record label which operated as a division of Universal Music Japan. The record label was launched on April 1, 2013, following the absorption of EMI Music Japan and its in-house record labels by Universal Japan. After multiple restructures within Universal Japan, EMI Records Japan was retired exactly one year after its formation. The label was succeeded by the formation of EMI Records and the short-lived EMI R label, eventually rebranding as Virgin Records, which ceased operation in 2017.

== History ==
After the European Commission approved the acquisition of EMI by Universal Music Group on September 21, 2012, restructuring and rebranding of several EMI labels under Universal Music followed on September 28, 2012, as the merger was approved. On January 15, 2013, Universal Music Japan president Kazuhiko Koike took over as CEO of EMI Music Japan, effectively controlling both companies until its integration into Universal Music Japan as a sublabel on April 1, 2013, as EMI Records Japan. Koike, meanwhile, had stated that the merger had a bad effect in terms of its international repertoire and employment. Artists from the former company were able to continue releasing material under Universal Japan but still maintaining the catalog code TOCT. As of October 2013, the TOCT catalogue was no longer in use and was replaced by TYCT (for the original EMI Records artists) and UPCH (for Nayutawave Records artists absorbed by EMI).

In February 2014, Universal Music Japan did a large-scale sub-label reorganization, with more than half of EMI Records Japan artists transferred to Nayutawave Records, renaming the latter as EMI Records. The remainder of the roster previously associated with Eastworld and Virgin Records Japan were moved to another sub-label, called EMI R. By June 2014, the EMI artists that were transferred to Nayutawave to form the EMI Records unit began using the UPCH catalogue code. On April 14, 2014, Universal Music Japan announced that EMI R and sublabels Universal International and Delicious Deli Records will be having their joint partnership by forming Virgin Music, with Universal International's EMI label distribution be merged later on. In July 2014, EMI R was once again renamed to Virgin Records.
