= Ataru (TV series) =

TBS TV series

- Promotional poster
- Genre: Comedy, Action; Mystery
- Created by: Sakurai Takeharu
- Written by: Sakurai Takeharu
- Directed by: Hisashi Kimura; Ken Yoshida; Satoshi Kan
- Starring: Masahiro Nakai; Kazuki Kitamura; Chiaki Kuriyama
- Country of origin: Japan
- Original language: Japanese
- No. of episodes: 11

Production
- Executive producer: Hiroki Ueda,
- Producer: Satoshi Kan
- Production location: Japan
- Production company: TBS

Original release
- Network: TBS
- Release: 15 April 2012 – June 24, 2012

Ataru is a TBS series is about an autistic young man with a mysterious past who helps the police solve criminal cases. It stars Masahiro Nakai in the title role and has received 19.9% TV viewership ratings. It was Nakai’s last role in a drama before his retirement in 2025.

== Cast ==
- Masahiro Nakai as Ataru / Chokozai
- Kazuki Kitamura as Shunichi Sawa
- Chiaki Kuriyama as Maiko Ebina
- Yuta Tamamori as Sho Ebina
- Go Riju as Tatsuo Ebina
- Kaoru Okunuki as Mariko Ebina
- Kyusaku Shimada as Youji Nakatsugawa
- Tetsushi Tanaka as Reiji Atsumi
- Seiji Chihara as Hasuo Nozaki
- Yasuhi Nakamura as Koshiro Inukai
- Ken Shounozaki as Kouki Matsushima
- Kaoru Mitsumune as Yui Ishikawa
- Masaya Nakamura as Nagamasa Kuroki
- Hiromichi Miyoshi as Takashi Tamakura
- Masachika Ichimura as Chokozai’s father
- Hiroaki Murakami as Larry Inoue
- Yuta Hiraoka as Takuro Kimihara
