= Neko Saito =

Neko Saito 斎藤ネコ
- Born: May 29, 1959 (age 67); Tokyo, Japan
- Origin: Japan
- Occupations: Violinist, composer, music arranger, conductor
- Instrument: Violin
- Years active: 1978–present
- Member of: Saito Neko Quartet
- Website: www2s.biglobe.ne.jp/~neko22/

Takeshi Saito (斎藤毅, Saitō Takeshi; born May 29, 1959 in Tokyo), better known by his stage name Neko Saito (斎藤ネコ, Saitō Neko), is a Japanese violinist, conductor, composer and music arranger. Saito is the leader of the Saito Neko Quartet, and is known for his many collaborations with musician Ringo Sheena.

== Biography ==
Saito began playing the violin at the age of three, and in 1966 made his first appearance on the NHK television show Violin no Okeiko at the age of seven. In 1975, he began attending the Tokyo University of the Arts associated music high school, and in 1978 entered the university itself, majoring in composition. He joined the string ensemble Pivot while at university, and began working as the assistant of Hideo Ichikawa in 1979.

From 1984, Saito worked as a violinist for the tours of musicians Akiko Kobayashi and Kosetsu Minami, and in 1987 began work as a commercial jingle producer. In 1988, Saito formed the Saito Neko Quartet. They released the album Friendly Games in 1990. In 1992, Saito released an album of classical music, Hajimete no Classic Series 17: Heishi no Monogatari.

From 1990, Saito began collaborating with Hiroko Taniyama, arranging three songs on her album Tsumetai Mizu no Naka o Kimi to Aruiteiku. He continued to work on arranging songs from her original albums throughout the 1990s.

In 1999, Saito began collaborating with singer Ringo Sheena, performing violins on her debut album Muzai Moratorium. In 2003, Saito arranged Sheena's song "La salle de bain", and in 2007 the pair worked together to create Heisei Fūzoku, a soundtrack album for the film Sakuran. The soundtrack was commercially successful, reaching number one in Japan and becoming certified gold by the RIAJ.

Other than Taniyama and Sheena, Saito has collaborated with musicians Sayuri Ishikawa, Hikaru Utada, X Japan, Maaya Sakamoto, Seikima-II, Tamurapan, Radwimps and Yuki.

== Television programs ==
Saito arranged the soundtrack for the anime Mizuiro Jidai (1996–1997), alongside Harukichi Yamamoto. He arranged the soundtrack for the Kyoko Fukada-starring drama Imagine in 2001, and in 2009 started producing the music for the children's music program Okaasan to Issho for the Monoran Monoran and Poco Potteito segments.

== Discography ==
- Friendly Games (1990) (with Saito Neko Quartet)
- Hajimete no Classic Series 17: Heishi no Monogatari (はじめてのクラシック・シリーズ17／兵士の物語; "First Classics Series number 17: Soldier Story") (1992)
- Disney Baby Gengaku Shijūsō de Kiku Akachan to Okaasan no Tame no Ongaku: Omezame Time-yō (ディズニーベビー弦楽四重奏で聴く赤ちゃんとお母さんのための音楽 おめざめタイム用; "Disney Baby: String Quartet Music for Mother and Baby, for Wake Up Time") (2000) (with Saito Neko Quartet)
- Disney Baby Gengaku Shijūsō de Kiku Akachan to Okaasan no Tame no Ongaku: Oyasumi Time-yō (ディズニーベビー弦楽四重奏で聴く赤ちゃんとお母さんのための音楽 おやすみタイム用; "Disney Baby: String Quartet Music for Mother and Baby, for Sleep Time") (2000) (with Saito Neko Quartet)
- Palette (2000) (with Kōko Komine)
- Saito Neko CM Sakkyokushū (斎藤ネコCM作曲集; "Neko Saito Commercial Song Collection") (2003)
- Heisei Fūzoku (平成風俗; "Heisei Customs") (2007) (with Ringo Sheena)
