= Mitsugetsu-shō =

Compilation album by Ringo Sheena
- Released: November 13, 2013
- Recorded: 2000–2009
- Genre: Alternative rock; Folk music; Orchestra; jazz
- Length: 1:04:28
- Language: Japanese; English
- Label: EMI Records Japan
- Producer: Ringo Sheena

Ringo Sheena chronology
Saturday Night Gossip (2009)	Mitsugetsu-shō (2013)	Gyakuyunyū: Kōwankyoku (2014)

Mitsugetsu-shō (蜜月抄, "Honeymoon Excerpt"), is a live compilation album by Japanese musician Ringo Sheena. It was released on her 15th anniversary on November 13, 2013, alongside a collaborations compilation album called Ukina. The album consists of recordings taken from Sheena's solo concert DVDs released between 2000 and 2008, as well as material from the NHK music television show Songs in 2009.

== Background and development ==
Mitsugetsu-shō was released as a part of Ringo Sheena's 15th anniversary celebrations. Sheena previously celebrated her 5th and 10th anniversaries: for her 5th anniversary in 2003, she held the Sugoroku Ecstasy tour and released her "Ringo no Uta" single. For her 10th in 2008, she released the B-side compilation album Watashi to Hōden, performed the Ringo Expo 08 series of concerts and released the Mora album box set.

In 2012, Sheena's band Tokyo Jihen released a live compilation album Tokyo Collection, compiling live recordings from seven different concerts. This was a part of the band's farewell releases, including the B-side collection album Shin'ya Waku and the box set Hard Disk (2013).

Mitsugetsu-shō was released alongside Ukina, a collaboration album featuring works from other musicians' albums that Sheena contributed to. Also released on that on November 13 were The Sexual Healing Total Care Course 120min. and Live, two box sets compiling all of her visual media. Many of her previous live DVDs were also re-released on Blu-ray on the same day: Gekokujō Xstasy (2000), Hatsuiku Status: Gokiritsu Japon (2000), Baishō Ecstasy (2003), Electric Mole (2003), Zazen Extasy (2008) and Ringo Expo 08 (2009).

== Production ==
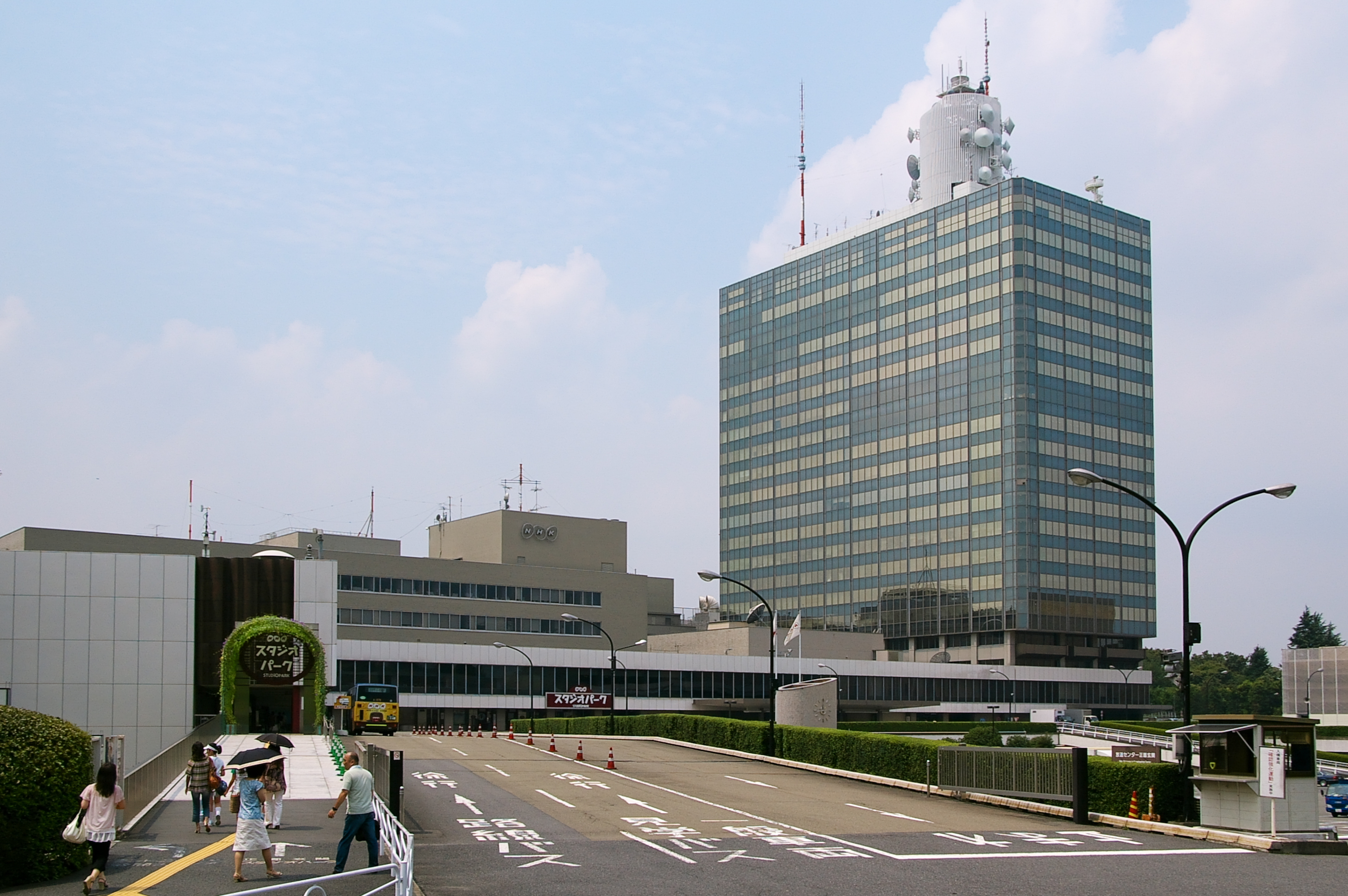
The NHK Broadcasting Center, where the program Songs is recorded. Performances of "Ariamaru Tomi" and "Mittei Monogatari" recorded for this show in 2009 were included on Mitsugetsu-shō.

Songs were taken from ten different concerts between 2000 and 2009, mostly those already released on DVD or Blu-ray. Three songs were taken from Gekokujō Xstasy, recorded at the NHK Hall in Tokyo on April 26, 2000. One song was taken from her Gokiritsu Japon tour as a member of List of bands associated with Ringo Sheena#Hatsuiku Status, held on July 8, 2000 at the Shinjuku Liquid Room in Tokyo. Three songs were recorded at the Kaho Gekijō in Iizuka, Fukuoka on July 30, 2000 as a part of her one night only Zazen Extasy concert, which was released on DVD in 2008. One song was recorded at the Kudan Kaidan in Tokyo at her Baishō Ecstasy concert on May 27, 2003. Two songs were taken from her Sugoroku Ecstasy tour performance at the Nippon Budokan on September 27, 2003, released on her Electric Mole DVD. Two songs were taken from her Dai Ikkai Ringo-han Taikai no Moyō DVD that included two different concerts as a part of her Dai Ikkai Ringo-han Taikai: Adults Only events. From the DVD, "Meisai" was recorded in early December 2005 at the Yebisu Garden Place in Ebisu, Shibuya, Tokyo, and performed with Neko Saito, while "Ringo no Uta" was a collaboration with singer-songwriter Kiyoshi Hasegawa and his granddaughter Maki, and recorded in late December 2005 at Daikanyama Unit, also in Ebisu. Two songs were taken from Ringo Expo 08, performed at the Saitama Super Arena on November 30, 2008. Two songs were taken from the NHK television show Songs, that Sheena had performed four song sets consecutively for two weeks in 2009. "Ariamaru Tomi" was taken from the June 24, 2009 broadcast, and "Mittei Monogatari" from July 1, 2009.

Only six of the songs picked for the album were released as singles by Sheena. Four songs come from her debut album Muzai Moratorium (1999), three from Shōso Strip (2000), three from Kalk Samen Kuri no Hana (2003), one from Heisei Fūzoku (2007) and one from Sanmon Gossip (2009). Additionally, "Aozora" was a B-side for her 1999 single "Honnō" and "Kon'ya Dō" was a Hatsuiku Status song that never had a studio recording released. "Ringo no Uta" (2003) and "Ariamaru Tomi" (2009) were released as singles, however do not currently make appearances on any of Sheena's studio albums (however a self-cover by Sheena's band Tokyo Jihen of "Ringo no Uta" was released on their debut album Kyōiku (2004)).

== Promotion and release ==
Several days after the album's release, Sheena held a series of concerts at the Orchard Hall in Tokyo called Tōtaikai: Heisei Nijūgo-nen Kaneyama-chō Taikai (党大会 平成二十五年神山町大会, "The Party Convention: 2013 Kamiyama Event") on November 18, 19, 20, 25 and 26. Two additional concerts for Sheena's fanclub called Hantaikai: Heisei Nijūgo-nen Hamarikyū Taikai (班大会 平成二十五年浜離宮大会, "The Squad Convention: 2013 Hamarikyū Event") were held on November 28 and 29 at the Hamarikyu Asahi Hall in Tokyo. The November 29 concert was broadcast simultaneously on website Livespire, as well as at 80 movie theaters across Japan.

Unlike Ukina, Mitsugetsu-shō was not released in other territories such as Taiwan, South Korea or Hong Kong. However, it was released as a digital download to iTunes.

== Chart reception ==
The album debuted at number 6 on Oricon's albums chart, selling 15,000 copies. After charting in the top 300 for eight weeks, the album sold a total of 25,000 copies. It sold 10,000 copies less than Ukina, a collaborations album released on the same day, and 37,000 copies less than Tokyo Collection, which was released in 2012.

== Critical reception ==
Critical reception was positive for Mitsugetsu-shō. CDJournal reviewers called her vocals "heartfelt and intense," and believed her voice "transcended time" and felt the same no matter if it was band-backed or orchestra-backed. Sayako Oki from Skream! believed it was satisfying to hear the live arrangements, live singing and natural breathing found on the disc. She felt it was a suitable release for Sheena's 15th anniversary.

== Track listing ==
All tracks are written by Ringo Sheena, except where noted

No.	Title	Taken from	Length
1.	"Honnō"	Gekokujō Xstasy (2000)	4:59
2.	"Kabukichō no Joō"	Zazen Extasy (2000)	2:50
3.	"Ariamaru Tomi"	NHK Songs (2009)	5:58
4.	"Meisai" (迷彩 "Camouflage")	Dai Ikkai Ringohan Taikai no Moyō (2005)	4:05
5.	"Kon'ya Dō" (今夜だふ "How About Tonight?;" writers: Sheena, Hisako Tabuchi)	Gokiritsu Japon (2000)	2:00
6.	"Akane Sasu, Kiro Terasaredo..." (茜さす 帰路照らされど… "The Crimson Sun Still Shines on My Way Back, But...")	Zazen Extasy (2000)	4:03
7.	"Tsumiki Asobi" (積木遊び "Playing with Blocks")	Gekokujō Xstasy (2000)	4:21
8.	"Yokushitsu" (浴室 "Bathroom")	Zazen Extasy (2000)	5:15
9.	"Stem" (lyrics: Robbie Clark)	Ringo Expo (2008)	4:42
10.	"Ringo no Uta" (with Kiyoshi Hasegawa and Maki)	Dai Ikkai Ringohan Taikai no Moyō (2005)	3:35
11.	"Tsumi to Batsu"	Sugoroku Ecstasy (2003)	5:53
12.	"Marunouchi Sadistic"	Sugoroku Ecstasy (2003)	3:47
13.	"Mittei Monogatari" (密偵物語 "Spy Story;" lyrics: Jack Brown)	NHK Songs (2009)	3:13
14.	"Aozora" (あおぞら "Blue Sky")	Gekokujō Xstasy (2000)	2:44
15.	"Poltergeist" (ポルターガイスト Porutāgaisuto)	Baishō Ecstasy (2003)	3:16
16.	"Kono Yo no Kagiri" (with Junpei Shiina)	Ringo Expo (2008)	3:39
Total length:			64:28

== Chart rankings ==
=== Charts ===
Charts (2013)	Peak position
Japan Oricon daily albums	3
Japan Oricon weekly albums	6
Japan Oricon monthly albums	24

=== Sales and certifications ===
Chart	Amount
Oricon physical sales	24,000

== Release history ==
Region	Date	Format	Distributing Label	Catalogue codes
Japan	November 13, 2013	CD, digital download	EMI Records Japan	TYCT-60009, TYCT-69006
Japan	November 30, 2013	Rental CD	EMI Records Japan	TYCT-60009, TYCT-69006
