= Chuixian San Chi =

Chuíxián Sān Chǐ

Compilation album by Ringo Sheena
- Released: June 24, 2015
- Recorded: 1998–2015
- Genre: Rock, jazz, pop
- Length: 55:10
- Language: Japanese
- Label: Universal Taiwan
- Producer: Ringo Sheena

Ringo Sheena chronology
| Hi Izuru Tokoro (2014) | Chuíxián Sān Chǐ (2015) | Gyakuyunyū: Kōkūkyoku (2017) |

Chuíxián Sān Chǐ (Chinese: 垂涎三尺, "Mouth Watering"), is a compilation album by Japanese musician Ringo Sheena. A special release to commemorate her first concert in Taipei, Taiwan. It was released on June 24, 2015, exclusively in Taiwan. The album compiles songs released throughout Sheena's career, focusing on her earliest two albums Muzai Moratorium (1999) and Shōso Strip (2000).

== Background and development ==
After the release of Sheena's fifth studio album Hi Izuru Tokoro in November 2014, Sheena toured the album in November and December 2014, with Ringo Haku '14: Toshionna no Gyakushū, a series of concerts held for her fan-club in Saitama, Osaka and Fukuoka in Japan. Sheena quickly released a follow-up single after the album "Shijō no Jinsei" in January and February 2015, a song that was commissioned for the Nippon TV drama Maru Maru Tsuma. During the same period, Sheena was asked by Japanese boyband SMAP to write a song for them to sing as the theme song for the drama Zeni no Sensō. Called "Karei Naru Gyakushū" (華麗なる逆襲; "Magnificent Counterattack"), the song was released as a physical single on the same day as "Shijō no Jinsei".

In April, Sheena announced that she would be performing her first overseas concert in Taiwan, Línqín bó'15: Chuíxián Sān Chǐ (Chinese: 林檎博'15 -垂涎三尺-, "Ringo Expo '15: Mouth Watering"). The concert was announced to be held on August 16, at the Taipei World Trade Center Nangang Exhibition Hall. On April 17, Universal Music Taiwan asked her Taiwanese fans to select their favorite songs of Sheena's, choosing from Sheena's five original studio albums, the three-CD set Ze-Chyou Syuu (2000), Sheena's soundtrack album for the film Sakuran collaborating with Neko Saito, Heisei Fūzoku (2007), six of the songs from the collaboration compilation album Ukina (2013), her self-cover album Gyakuyunyū: Kōwankyoku (2014) and the A-sides and B-sides of Sheena's singles from "Kōfukuron" (1998) to "Saihate ga Mitai" (2015). Released in May 2015, "Saihate ga Mitai" was a song written by Sheena originally for the singer Sayuri Ishikawa, which was released globally as digital single because of its use as the theme song of the animated film Miss Hokusai.

The album's cover artwork was designed by Yutaka Kimura, who won the Recording Industry Association of Japan's Music Jacket Award 2015 awards for Sheena's 2014 self-cover album Gyakuyunyū: Kōwankyoku. Kimura created the cover artwork for Chuíxián Sān Chǐ based on the cover of Gyakuyunyū: Kōwankyoku.

== Content ==
The album is primarily composed of songs taken from Sheena's first two albums Muzai Moratorium (1999) and Shōso Strip (2000). Additionally, the album features "Stem (Daimyō Asobi-hen)", the preceding single from Sheena's third album Kalk Samen Kuri no Hana (2003), "Ryūkō", one of the promotional tracks from the album Sanmon Gossip (2009) which features rapper Mummy-D from the group Rhymester, "Ariamaru Tomi", a song released as a single in 2009 but later compiled onto Sheena's album Hi Izuru Tokoro (2014) and "Shijō no Jinsei", a song released as a single earlier in 2015. Of the twelve songs on the album, only two were not released as A-sides of physical singles: "Yokushitsu" and "Ryūkō".

While all of the songs were chosen from the songs that appear on Sheena's studio albums (with the exception of the recently released "Shijō no Jinsei"), two of the songs appear as the original versions included on singles: "Kōfukuron" and "Stem (Daimyō Asobi hen)". While not on the original issues of Muzai Moratorium or Kalk Samen Kuri no Hana, both of the original versions of these songs were included in the 2008 box set Mora as bonus tracks.

== Release and reception ==
At the August 16 Taiwanese concert, Sheena performed seven of the twelve songs featured on Chuíxián Sān Chǐ. Of the concert attendees, approximately a third purchased a copy of Chuíxián Sān Chǐ. In its first week of release, the album was the fifth most purchased non-Mandarin East Asian CD release in Taiwan, according to the G-Music charts.

== Track listing ==
| No. | Title | Writer(s) | Length |
|---|---|---|---|
| 1. | "Honnō" (本能, "Instinct". Chinese: Běnnéng) | Sheena | 4:16 |
| 2. | "Kabukichō no Joō" (歌舞伎町の女王, "Queen of Kabukichō". pinyin: Gēwǔjì-tīng nǚwáng) | Sheena | 2:53 |
| 3. | "Tsumi to Batsu" (罪と罰, "Crime and Punishment". Chinese: 罪與罰; pinyin: Zuì yǔ fá) | Sheena | 4:44 |
| 4. | "Gips" (ギブス Gibusu. pinyin: Shígāo) | Sheena | 5:28 |
| 5. | "Marunouchi Sadistic" (丸の内サディスティック Marunouchi Sadisutikku. Chinese: 丸之內虐待狂; pinyin: Wánzhīnèi nüèdài kuáng) | Sheena | 3:56 |
| 6. | "Ariamaru Tomi" (ありあまる富, "Excessive Wealth". Chinese: 滿滿的財富; pinyin: Mǎn mǎn de cáifù) | Sheena, Tomotaka Imamichi | 5:40 |
| 7. | "Koko de Kiss Shite." (ここでキスして。, "Kiss Me Here". Chinese: 在這裡接吻; pinyin: Zài zhèlǐ jiēwěn) | Sheena | 4:18 |
| 8. | "Stem (Daimyō Asobi hen)" (茎(STEM) ～大名遊ビ編～, "Stem (At Play with a Feudal Lord)". Chinese: Jīng (dàmíng yóu biān)) | Sheena | 4:18 |
| 9. | "Yokushitsu" (浴室 "Bathroom". Chinese: Yùshì) | Sheena | 4:28 |
| 10. | "Ryūkō" (流行, "Vogue". Chinese: Liúxíng) | Sheena, Mummy-D | 4:15 |
| 11. | "Shijō no Jinsei" (至上の人生, "A Life Supreme". pinyin: Zhìshàng rénshēng) | Sheena | 4:13 |
| 12. | "Kōfukuron" (幸福論, "A View of Happiness". Chinese: Xìngfú lùn) | Sheena | 3:41 |
| Total length: | | | 55:10 |

== Charts ==
| Chart (2015) | Peak position |
|---|---|
| Taiwan G-Music East Asian releases | 5 |

== Release history ==
| Region | Date | Format | Distributing Label | Catalogue codes |
|---|---|---|---|---|
| Taiwan | June 24, 2015 | CD | Universal | 0661014 |
