= Apple of Universal Gravity =

Compilation album by Ringo Sheena
- Released: November 13, 2019
- Length: 118:00
- Languages: Japanese; English
- Labels: EMI; Universal
- Producer: Ringo Sheena

Ringo Sheena chronology
Sandokushi (2019)	Apple of Universal Gravity (2019)	La Panacée de Tous les Maux (2022)

Apple of Universal Gravity, also referred to by its Japanese title Newton no Ringo ~Hajimete no Best Ban~ (ニュートンの林檎 ～初めてのベスト盤～; Newton's Apple ～First Best Edition～), is a compilation album by Japanese musician Ringo Sheena. It was released through EMI Records on November 13, 2019, and became Sheena's first number-one album in Japan in 10 years, debuting atop the Oricon Albums Chart with 97,200 physical sales. It also topped the Billboard Japan Hot Albums chart.

== Album title ==
The album's English and Japanese title refer to Newton's apple, as well as Isaac Newton's law of universal gravitation. It is also a reference to Sheena's stage name Ringo (林檎), which means "apple" in Japanese.

== Track listing ==
The title is given as that shown on Western music services first, followed by the Japanese title and its transliteration. The Western titles often differ from the literal translation of the Japanese title.

Disc one
No.	Title	Length
1.	"The Sun & Moon" (LDN version) (with Hikaru Utada) (浪漫と算盤; Roman to Soroban)	4:26
2.	"A View of Happiness" (幸福論; Kōfukuron)	3:42
3.	"Slide" (すべりだい; Suberidai)	4:00
4.	"Correct City" (正しい街; Tadashii Machi)	3:52
5.	"Queen of Kabukicho" (歌舞伎町の女王; Kabukichō no Joō)	2:55
6.	"Marunouchi Sadistic" (丸の内サディスティック; Marunouchi Sadisutikku)	3:55
7.	"Kiss Me" (ここでキスして。; Koko de Kisu Shite.)	4:19
8.	"Gips" (ギブス; Gibusu)	5:29
9.	"Crime and Punishment" (罪と罰; Tsumi to Batsu)	4:41
10.	"Instinct" (本能; Honnō)	4:15
11.	"Chastity at Midnight" (真夜中は純潔; Mayonaka wa Junketsu)	4:18
12.	"Camouflage" (迷彩; Meisai)	3:46
13.	"Stem (At Play with a Feudal Lord)" (茎(STEM)〜大名遊ビ編〜; Kuki (STEM) ~Daimyo Asobi hen~)	4:20
14.	"A Song of Apples" (りんごのうた; Ringo no Uta)	3:27
15.	"Marunouchi Sadistic" (Neetskills Remix)	3:10

Disc two
No.	Title	Length
1.	"Open Secret" (公然の秘密; Kōzen no Himitsu)	3:01
2.	"Memory" (with Junpei Shiina) (この世の限り; Kono Yo no Kagiri)	3:28
3.	"Vogue" (流行; Ryūkō)	4:17
4.	"Season" (旬; Shun)	4:47
5.	"Collateral Damage" (自由へ道連れ; Jiyū e Michizure)	3:33
6.	"L'œillet" (カーネーション; Kānēshon)	2:59
7.	"Nippon"	3:53
8.	"The Invaluable" (ありあまる富; Ariamaru Tomi)	5:40
9.	"Le Moment" (青春の瞬き; Seishun no Matataki)	5:18
10.	"Ma Vie, Mes Rêves" (人生は夢だらけ; Jinsei wa Yume Darake)	3:14
11.	"The Creamy Season" (おいしい季節; Oishii Kisetsu)	4:17
12.	"The Narrow Way" (with Hiroji Miyamoto) (獣ゆく細道; Kemono Yuku Hosomichi)	3:42
13.	"In Summer, Night" (with Ukigumo) (長く短い祭; Nagaku Mijikai Matsuri)	4:09
14.	"The Main Street" (with Tortoise Matsumoto) (目抜き通り; Menukidōri)	3:14
15.	"Jiyu-dom" (Hyadain's Riririri Remix) (with Kenichi Maeyamada)	2:27

== Charts ==
=== Weekly charts ===
Chart (2019)	Peak position
Japan Hot Albums (Billboard Japan)	1
Japanese Albums (Oricon)	1

=== Year-end charts ===
Chart (2019)	Position
Japanese Albums (Oricon)	22
