= Kyōiku =

Studio album by Tokyo Jihen
- Released: November 25, 2004
- Recorded: 2004
- Genre: Rock; pop; avant-garde
- Length: 42:11
- Language: Japanese; English
- Label: Toshiba EMI
- Producer: Tokyo Jihen

Tokyo Jihen chronology
Kyōiku (2004)	Adult (2006)

Singles from Kyōiku
- 1. "Gunjō Biyori" Released: September 8, 2004; 2. "Sōnan" Released: October 20, 2004

Kyōiku (教育; "Education") is the debut studio album by Japanese rock band Tokyo Jihen, led by musician Ringo Sheena. It was released on November 25, 2004, more than a year after Sheena's third solo studio album Kalk Samen Kuri no Hana (2003). Kyōiku is the only album to feature the band's original line-up, featuring guitarist Mikio Hirama and pianist Masayuki Hiizumi, known as H Zetto M.

== Background and development ==
While vocalist Ringo Sheena has been a member of several rock bands, she parted with her bandmates when she debuted as a solo musician in 1998. She had always wanted to be a member of a band, however, and used her first three solo albums, Muzai Moratorium (1999), Shōso Strip (2000) and Kalk Samen Kuri no Hana (2003) as a presentation for musicians who wanted to work with her.

After the release of Sheena's third album, Kalk Samen Kuri no Hana in 2003, Sheena embarked on a nationwide tour entitled Sugoroku Ecstasy. Sheena asked the backing members well in advance to perform for the tour, so that her first choices would not be double-booked. These members were dubbed Tokyo Jihen, a name that was publicised during the tour. Tokyo Jihen was officially announced as Sheena's main musical unit on May 31, 2004, and first performed at a series of summer music festivals in July and August 2004.

== Writing and production ==
The album is composed of nine songs composed by Sheena, as well as three songs composed by pianist H Zetto M, "Gunjō Biyori", "Genjitsu ni Oite" and "Service". The album features 10 songs sung in Japanese, plus "Genjitsu ni Oite", an instrumental, and "Genjitsu ni Warau", a song sung in English. For her first three solo albums, Sheena worked as the sole songwriter on all of the songs. Sheena stated that it had been "a dream of sorts" to release music that collaborated with different songwriters, and she wanted Tokyo Jihen to be different from her solo project, in which her opinion was final on all matters. Later Tokyo Jihen albums featured much more song-writing from other members, most notably Variety (2007), however Sheena still had the feeling that it was "taboo" for other people to write songs for her during Kyōiku. All 17 of the songs for the Kyōiku era were recorded over a period of four days.

Sheena wanted to create a fun album, after noting that critics had not reviewed many albums that were "like an overturned toy-box" in recent years. Being a fan of all four members, wrote the songs as "love letters" to each members' techniques, writing songs that would show off techniques she wanted to see each member performing. Sheena's songs were inspired by the image of the Sugoroku Tour that Tokyo Jihen performed with her during her solo era. "Sōnan" was the first song she wrote for the album in 2003, shortly after the tour finished. The theme of each Tokyo Jihen album is based around a television channel, and Kyōiku was themed around NHK Educational TV.

Sheena recorded the demos of her compositions songs with guitarist Ryosuke Nagaoka, who would later join Tokyo Jihen as their second guitarist in 2005. During the pre-production stages of the album, H Zetto M also gave Sheena a collection of demos he had composed for her. "Gunjō Biyori" was the first song present, and after listening Sheena felt as if he had written the song specifically for Sheena, and everything she was experiencing.

The first song on the album, "Ringo no Uta", is a self-cover of a song Sheena released as a single in 2003. Sheena decided to add the song to the album to make it easier for fans of her solo work to accept her transition into becoming a member of Tokyo Jihen.

=== Album symmetry and palindromes ===
Track list symmetry
01. 林檎の唄; A Song of Apples	12. 夢のあと; A Scar of Dreams
02. 群青日和; Ideal Days for Ultramarine	11. 母国情緒; Feelings for My; Motherland
03. 入水願い; The Suicide	10. 御祭騒ぎ; The Carnival
04. 遭難; A Distress	09. 駅前; A Station
05. クロール; Crawl	08. サービス; Service
06. 現実に於て; Back to Earth	07. 現実を嗤う; Laugh at Facts

Kyōiku, much like Sheena's solo albums Shōso Strip (2000) and Kalk Samen Kuri no Hana (2003) features titles with mirroring styles in the two halves of the album. Each Japanese title and its matching pair are same number of characters, and match in terms of where kanji, hiragana or katakana scripts were used. The English titles published at Sheena and Tokyo Jihen's personal production agency website, Kronekodow, also follow a similar style. The titles from each half mirror prepositions, articles and nouns, as well as the number of words used.

Much like Sheena's Kalk Samen Kuri no Hana, all of the track lengths on Kyōiku are palindromic numbers.

== Promotion and release ==
In July and September 2004, Tokyo Jihen performed at four festivals across Japan: 0724 Yamabikari at Kobe Chicken George on July 24, Meet the World Beat on July 25, 2004 in Suita, Osaka, the Fuji Rock Festival in Niigata Prefecture on July 30 and the SunSet Live 2004 festival in Fukuoka Prefecture on September 3. In September 2004 the band announced a national tour entitled Live Tour 2005 "Dynamite!". Held in January and February 2005, the 14-date tour featured dates in Matsuyama, Ehime, Hiroshima, Kanazawa, Ishikawa, Kyoto, Sapporo, Saitama and two performances each in Osaka, Fukuoka, Nagoya and Tokyo.

The album was preceded by two singles, "Gunjō Biyori" in September and "Sōnan" in October. "Gunjō Biyori" was used in a commercial campaign for the Sanyo-manufactured au W21SA range of cellphones. The band first performed on television on October 29, when they performed "Sōnan" at Music Station. They performed two more times on the program, on November 26 where they performed "Ringo no Uta" and the B-side for "Sōnan", "Dynamite", and on the new year's special on December 24, where "Gunjō Biyori" was performed. "Gunjō Biyori" was also performed on the program Count Down TV on November 27, 2004.

On the date of release, a limited edition vinyl record compiling the six songs found on the "Gunjō Biyori" and "Sōnan" singles was released. Two weeks later, the band released Tokyo Incidents Vol. 1, a DVD featuring the music videos associated with the album and its singles.

== Live performances ==
At the band's early festival performances in July and September 2004, Tokyo Jihen performed the singles "Gunjō Biyori", "Sōnan" as well as Sheena's single "Ringo no Uta". The songs "Ekimae", "Omatsuri Sawagi" and "Service" exclusive to the album were debuted at these concerts.

The band toured the album in January 2005, with a tour entitled Dynamite!. The entire album was performed during these concerts (thought the song "Crawl" was performed in a medley with Sheena's song "Σ" from her 2000 single "Gips"). At the Dai Ikkai Ringohan Taikai: Adults Only fan-club concerts in December 2005, the band performed the songs "Jusui Negai", "Crawl" and "Sōnan", however their performances were not featured on the DVD release of the concert.

After guitarist Mikio Hirama and pianist H Zetto M left the band in 2005 and were replaced by Ukigumo and Ichiyo Izawa respectively, the band released their second album Adult (2006). The album was first toured the album with the Domestic! Virgin Line concerts in February 2006, where the songs "Bokoku Jocho", "Service", and "Yume no Ato" were performed. The band's national tour for Adult, Domestic! Just Can't Help It. in April and May 2006, featured the songs "Genjitsu ni Oite" (in a medley with "Kao"), "Genjitsu ni Oite", "Jusui Negai", "Service" and "Gunjō Biyori". At the Tokyo Jihen organised Society of the Citizens event on July 2, the band performed "Service" and "Omatsuri Sawagi", and at their appearance at Countdown Japan in December 2006, they performed "Yume no Ato" and "Ringo no Uta" a final time.

Since 2007, only three songs on the album were performed by the band. "Gunjō Biyori" was performed for three tours, Spa & Treatment (2007), Discovery (2011) and Bon Voyage (2012). "Sōnan" was performed at the band's Ultra C (2010) tour, and "Omatsuri Sawagi" at Bon Voyage.

=== Ringo Sheena self-covers ===
At Sheena's Dai Ikkai Ringohan Taikai: Adults Only events in November 2005, Sheena performed "Omatsuri Sawagi" in collaboration with folk musician Kiyoshi Hasegawa and his granddaughter Maki. For Sheena's soundtrack album Heisei Fūzoku (2007) to the film Sakuran, she included a re-arranged version of the song "Yume no Ato". She performed the song at her 10th anniversary Ringo-haku '08 concerts at Saitama Super Arena in November 2008, along with "Omatsuri Sawagi".

For Sheena's self-cover album Gyakuyunyū: Kōwankyoku (2014), Sheena promoted with the release with a short tour, Chotto Shita Recohatsu in May and June 2014. At the tour, she performed the songs "Bokoku Jōcho" and "Sōnan".

== Critical reception ==
Reviewer Tomoyuki Mori felt Kyōiku was the first time in Sheena's career where she was free to have fun with music, and likened the release to junior high school students having fun by forming a band. Mori felt that Sheena began expressing her humanity in Kyoiku, unlike in her solo works. Vibe reviewer Chikako Hayashi felt "Ringo no Uta" was representative of Sheena's change from solo artist to band member, in that the version found on K was from a completely different perspective to Sheena's original solo version. Hayashi also noted the "fresh feeling" to "newcomer" act Tokyo Jihen that could be felt in the album. CDJournal reviewers noted the "bossa-like melody turning into rock" in "Jusui Negai" as leaving a strong impression on them, and praised Sheena's "provocative and stimulating vocals" in "Crawl", likening the song's guitar riff to The Kinks' "You Really Got Me". They described "Service as "avant-garde", and felt "Yume no Ato" was worthy of being a signature song of the band.

For the single track "Gunjō Biyori", Listenmusic reviewer Kiyohiko Koike felt Hiizumi's melody was unlike something Sheena would create herself, however also noted the "profound lyrics based on old timey vocabulary" was a highlight, and still managed to convey Sheena's worldview. He further noted that Sheena felt at ease in the role of a vocalist. CDJournal reviewers felt the song had a slightly different image to what Sheena had in her solo career, noting that listeners could hear the enjoyment Sheena had at being able to play in a band. What's In? reviewers also noted the sense of freedom in the song present in the sound work not seen in Sheena's solo career. Reviewer Yū Onoda called the single "vivid" and the band's sound "thrilling".

Reviewers also praised the album's second single "Sōnan", with Koike feeling the melody had a "good old sepia Shōwa Kayō taste", likening it to her earlier songs "Kabukichō no Joō" and "Marunouchi Sadistic". He noted that Sheena's lyric style was much like her previous songs, written in an old, literary style. CDJournal reviewers felt the song was as if the solo era image of Sheena had been taken and bulked up by the band in the song. Reviewer Kyosuke Tsuchiya noted the song's "jazz-style approach", and was impressed by the "wild power" of Sheena's vocals and the "suspicious melody" created by the guitar.

== Commercial performance ==
The album debuted at number two on Oricon's weekly albums chart, selling 205,000 copies. This was underneath Ken Hirai's Sentimentalovers, which featured the songs "Hitomi o Tojite" and "Omoi ga Kasanaru Sono Mae ni...", produced by band member Seiji Kameda. After the album spent a total of 35 weeks in the top 300 albums, it sold a total of 391,000 copies. Kyōiku is the most commercially successful of Tokyo Jihen's albums. Similarly, the "Gunjō Biyori" and "Sōnan" singles were commercially successful, both peaking at two on Oricon's single chart, and certified gold by the RIAJ. They band's two most successful singles, in terms of physical copies sold.

== Track listing ==
All lyrics by Ringo Sheena; all music by Sheena, except where noted.

No.	Title	Music	Length
1.	"Ringo no Uta"		2:52
2.	"Gunjō Biyori"	H Zetto M	3:33
3.	"Jusui Negai" (入水願い "Drowning Wish")		3:23
4.	"Sōnan"		3:23
5.	"Crawl" (クロール Kurōru)		4:04
6.	"Genjitsu ni Oite" (現実に於て "In Reality"; instrumental)	H Zetto M	1:11
7.	"Genjitsu o Warau" (現実を嗤う "Laugh at Reality")		4:24
8.	"Service" (サービス Sābisu)	H Zetto M	4:04
9.	"Ekimae" (駅前 "In Front of the Station")		3:53
10.	"Omatsuri Sawagi" (御祭騒ぎ "Festival Bustle")		3:33
11.	"Bokoku Jōcho" (母国情緒 "Homely Atmosphere")		3:03
12.	"Yume no Ato" (夢のあと "A Scar of Dreams")		4:44
Total length:			42:11

== Personnel ==
Personnel details were sourced from Kyōiku's liner notes booklet.

- Toshiki Hata – drums, claps
- Mikio Hirama – guitar, claps
- H Zetto M – piano, claps
- Seiji Kameda – bass, claps
- Ringo Sheena – vocals, claps
- Uni Inoue – recording, editing
- Yuji Kamijō – recording assistant
- Ichiko Furukawa – mastering
- Makoto Tonosu – additional mastering
- Yutaka Kimura – photography, design
- Shinji Konishi – hair, make-up
- Daisuke Iga – styling

== Charts ==
Charts (2004)	Peak position
Japan Oricon weekly albums	2
Japan Oricon monthly albums	4
Japan Oricon yearly albums	33

=== Sales and certifications ===
Chart	Amount
Oricon physical sales	391,000
RIAJ physical certification	Platinum (250,000+)

== Release history ==
Region	Date	Format	Distributing Label	Catalogue codes
Japan	November 25, 2004	CD, digital download	Toshiba EMI	TOCT-25452
South Korea	December 9, 2004	CD	EMI	2298881
South Korea	December 10, 2004	Digital download	EMI	
Taiwan	December 10, 2004	CD	Gold Typhoon	87564824
Japan	December 11, 2004	Rental CD	Toshiba EMI	TOCT-25452
