= Live Tour 2005 "Dynamite!" =

2005 concert tour by Tokyo Jihen

- Tour by Tokyo Jihen
- Promotional image for Tokyo Jihen's 2005 Japan tour
- Associated album: Kyōiku
- Start date: January 17, 2005
- End date: February 16, 2005
- Legs: 1
- No. of shows: 14

Tokyo Jihen concert chronology
- Live Tour 2005 "Dynamite" (2005); Dai Ikkai Ringo-han Taikai: Adults Only (2005)

Live Tour 2005 "Dynamite!" is the first concert tour by Japanese band Tokyo Jihen. The tour supported the band's debut studio album, Kyōiku (2004). It was the only tour to feature the band's original members Mikio Hirama and H Zetto M. The concert was released in the form of two video albums, a documentary, Dynamite In, on July 13, 2005, and a concert video, Dynamite Out, released on August 17, 2005.

== Background ==
After the release of vocalist Ringo Sheena's third album, Kalk Samen Kuri no Hana in 2003, Sheena embarked on a nationwide tour entitled Sugoroku Ecstasy. Sheena asked the backing members well in advance to perform for the tour, so that her first choices would not be double-booked. These members were dubbed Tokyo Jihen, a name that was publicised during the tour. During the tour, the song "Ringo no Uta" was briefly performed, which was released as a single by Sheena on November 25, 2003. Tokyo Jihen was officially announced as Sheena's main musical unit on May 31, 2004, and first performed at a series of summer music festivals: 0724 Yamabikari at Kobe Chicken George on July 24, Meet the World Beat on July 25, 2004 in Suita, Osaka, the Fuji Rock Festival in Niigata Prefecture on July 30 and the SunSet Live 2004 festival in Fukuoka Prefecture on September 3.

The concert tour was first announced in September 2004, before the release of the band's first single, "Gunjō Biyori". The band released a second single in October, "Sōnan", followed by their full-length album Kyōiku in December.

After the concerts, members Mikio Hirama and H Zetto M decided to leave the band; Hirama to focus on his solo work and H Zetto M to focus on performing as a member of Pe'z. These announcements were made together on July 1, 2005, before the release of the Dynamite In and Dynamite Out video albums.

== Concert synopsis ==
The concert began with "Ringo no Uta", a song originally released by Sheena as a solo single. The concert primarily featured songs from the band's Kyōiku album, as well as the four B-sides from the "Gunjō Biyori" and "Sōnan" singles - "Sono Onna Fushidara ni Tsuki", a cover of "The Lady Is a Tramp", "Kao", "Dynamite", a Brenda Lee cover and "Kokoro".

The band performed several additional songs that were originally released by Sheena as a solo musician: "Koko de Kiss Shite.", "Tsuki ni Makeinu", "Onaji Yoru" "Σ", "Marunouchi Sadistic" and "Stem". The song "If You Can Touch It" was originally released by band member Mikio Hirama on his album Yume to Negoto (2001). Two additional covers were "Koi no Urikomi", a cover of The Isley Brothers' "I'm Gonna Knock on Your Door", and Hibari Misora's "Kurumaya-san", which was originally released by the band on their Tokyo Incidents Vol. 1 music video DVD in December 2004.

Three unpublished songs that would be included on their second album, Adult (2006), were performed during the concerts: "Himitsu", "Super Star" and "Tōmei Ningen".

== Recordings ==
The band's performance at the Nagoya Century Hall on February 9, 2005 was recorded. The first release of footage from this concert was on the Dynamite In DVD, a 50-minute documentary released on July 13, 2005. It featured backstage footage, as well as performances of "Dynamite", "Koi no Urikomi (I'm Gonna Knock on Your Door)" "Tōmei Ningen", and the "Sigma~Crawl" medley. The majority of the concert was released a month later, on the Dynamite Out DVD. The DVDs were commercially successful, both peaking at number two on Oricon's overall DVD chart rankings. Dynamite In spent a total of 11 weeks in the top 50, while Dynamite Out a total of 18. Dynamite Out became the band's most commercially successful DVD release, followed by Dynamite In.

"Himitsu" was a song not present on the Dynamite Out video release. However, it was included in the Pour Homme special edition of the band's second album, Adult, in January 2006. The audio from the performances of "Super Star", "Gunjō Biyori" and "Yume no Ato" were included on the band's Tokyo Collection live compilation album, released in February 2012. For the band's video album Chin Play Kō Play released on August 29, 2012, the recordings of "Ringo no Uta", "Kurumaya-san" and "Koi no Urikomi (I'm Gonna Knock On Your Door)" were included for the section detailing the Dynamite! tour.

=== Promotion ===
To promote Dynamite Out, the performance of "Super Star" was shown on MTV Japan from July 25, 2005. A portion of the video was released to purchase on cellphones from July 26, and from August 1, portions of the performances of "Bokoku Jōcho", "Tsuki ni Makeinu" and "Service" were also added.

== Set list ==
1. "Ringo no Uta" (Ringo Sheena self-cover)
2. "Jusui Negai" (入水願い; "Drowning Wish")
3. "Sōnan"
4. "Dynamite" (ダイナマイト, Dainamaito) (Brenda Lee cover)
5. "Koko de Kiss Shite." (Ringo Sheena self-cover)
6. "Himitsu" (秘密; "A Secret") (Not included in Dynamite Out DVD, instead found on the album Adult (2006)'s bonus DVD)
7. "Kao" (顔; "Faces")
8. "If You Can Touch It" (Mikio Hirama self-cover)
9. "Bokoku Jōcho" (母国情緒; "Homely Atmosphere")
10. "Kurumaya-san" (車屋さん; "Mr. Taxi") (Hibari Misora cover)
11. "Tsuki ni Makeinu" (月に負け犬; "Underdog and the Moon") (Ringo Sheena self-cover)
12. "Onaji Yoru" (同じ夜; "Ordinary Night") (Ringo Sheena self-cover)
13. "Genjitsu ni Oite" (現実に於て; "In Reality")
14. "Genjitsu o Warau" (現実を嗤う; "Laugh at Reality")
15. "Koi no Urikomi (I'm Gonna Knock on Your Door)" (恋の売り込み; "Love Sales Pitch") (The Isley Brothers cover)
16. "Super Star" (スーパースター, Sūpāsutā)
17. "Tōmei Ningen" (透明人間; "Invisible Man")
18. "Ekimae" (駅前; "In Front of the Station")
19. "Σ~Crawl" (クロール, Shiguma Kurōru) (Performed as a medley. "Σ" a Ringo Sheena self-cover)
20. "Marunouchi Sadistic" (Ringo Sheena self-cover)
21. "Sono Onna Fushidara ni Tsuki (The Lady Is a Tramp)" (その淑女ふしだらにつき; "That Woman Is Loose") (from the musical Babes in Arms)
22. "Omatsuri Sawagi" (御祭騒ぎ; "Festival Bustle")
23. "Service" (サービス, Sābisu)
24. "Gunjō Biyori"
  Encore 1
25. "Kokoro" (心; "Heart")
26. "Yume no Ato" (夢のあと; "A Scar of Dreams")
  Encore 2
27. "Stem" (Ringo Sheena self-cover, performed at the February 16 date only, not present on Dynamite Out)

== Tour dates ==
Date	City	Country	Venue
January 17, 2005	Matsuyama	Japan	Matsuyama Shimin Kaikan
January 19, 2005	Hiroshima	Japan	Hiroshima Kōsei Nenkin Kaikan
January 21, 2005	Kanazawa	Japan	Ishikawa Kōsei Nenkin Kaikan
January 22, 2005	Kyoto	Japan	Kyoto Kaikan
January 25, 2005	Sapporo	Japan	Sapporo Shimin Kaikan
January 27, 2005	Sendai	Japan	Sendai Sun Plaza Hall
January 31, 2005	Osaka	Japan	Osaka Kōsei Nenkin Kaikan
February 1, 2005	Osaka	Japan	Osaka Kōsei Nenkin Kaikan
February 3, 2005	Fukuoka	Japan	Fukuoka Sunpalace
February 4, 2005	Fukuoka	Japan	Fukuoka Sunpalace
February 8, 2005	Nagoya	Japan	Nagoya Century Hall
February 9, 2005	Nagoya	Japan	Nagoya Century Hall
February 15, 2005	Tokyo	Japan	Shibuya Public Hall
February 16, 2005	Tokyo	Japan	Shibuya Public Hall

== Personnel ==
- Toshiki Hata – drums
- Mikio Hirama – guitar
- H Zetto M – piano
- Seiji Kameda – bass
- Ringo Sheena – vocals
- Hiroshi Usui – DVD editor
