= Gekokujyo Xstasy =

2000 video album by Ringo Sheena

- DVD edition cover

Video by Ringo Sheena
- Released: 7 December 2000
- Recorded: 26 April and 31 May 2000
- Venue: NHK Hall; Fukuoka Sunpalace
- Genre: J-pop
- Length: 90 minutes
- Label: Toshiba EMI
- Producer: Inoue Uni

Ringo Sheena chronology
Seiteki Healing ~Sono-Ni~ (1999)	Gekokujyo Xstasy (2000)	Hatsuiku Status Gokiritsu Japon (2000)

Gekokujyo Xstasy
- Tour by Shiina Ringo
- Start date: April 17, 2000
- End date: June 7, 2000
- No. of shows: 15

Shiina Ringo concert chronology
- Manabiya Ecstasy; Gekokujyo Xstasy; Hatsuiku Status Gokiritsu Japon

Gekokujyo Xstasy (下剋上エクスタシー, Gekokujō Ekusutashii), also known as Revolt Ecstasy, is a video album by Japanese singer and songwriter Ringo Sheena, released on 7 December 2000 by Toshiba EMI. It contains a live recording of Sheena during her first tour of the same name.

Sheena also released the video album Hatsuiku Status Gokiritsu Japon (発育ステータス 御起立ジャポン, Growth Status - Stand Up Japan)" simultaneously.

== Outline ==
Gekokujyo Xstasy was the first nationwide tour for Sheena performed from April 17, 2000 to June 7. The live video takes up two performances at NHK Hall and at Fukuoka Sunpalace mainly from this tour.

The stage design of the tour makes a hospital a motif like her single "Honnou." The stage setting imitated an operating room, and an ECG Monitor or an anatomical model of the human body, etc. were arranged on the stage, and the synthesizer and the drum set were laid on operating tables. Sheena wears a white dress looks like gauze bandages with which she blinds her body. Four members of the tour band also wear the white coat.

The recorded songs are chosen from the second album "Shoso Strip" mainly. Some songs containing singles such as "Koko de Kiss Shite" and "Gibs" were not recorded. New songs "Yattsuke Shigoto" and "Gamble" shown during this tour weren’t recorded, but, they were recorded in Sheena’s live album "Zecchōshū" instead.

== Tracklist ==
All tracks written by Ringo Sheena, except "Love is Blind" by Janis Ian.

No.	Title	Length
1.	"Honnō"
2.	"I Am a Liar" (虚言症 Kyogen-shō)
3.	"Kabukichou no Joou"
4.	"Blue Sky" (あおぞら Aozora)
5.	"A Broken Man and Moonlight" (月に負け犬 Tsuki ni Makeinu)
6.	"Identity" (アイデンティティ Aidentiti)
7.	"Caution" (警告 Keikoku)
8.	"Love is Blind"
9.	"Correct City" (正しい街 Tadashii Machi)
10.	"Playing With Blocks" (積木遊び Tsumiki Asobi)
11.	"Excuse Debussy" (弁解ドビュッシー Benkai Dobyusshii)
12.	"Kōfukuron" (joy version)
13.	"Tsumi to Batsu"
14.	"I Am an Addict" (依存症 Izon-shō)
15.	"Sid & Daydreams" (シドと白昼夢 Sido to Hakuchūmu)
16.	"Sickbed Public" (病床パブリック Byōshō Paburikku)
17.	"Marunouchi Sadistic"
18.	"Special Track (featuring Kachiikusa Kinen Gakudan and Masato Minagawa): "A Driving Rain in Darkness" (闇に降る雨 Yami ni furu ame); "Kōfukuron"; "Remote Control" (リモートコントローラー Rimōtokontorōrā); "Correct City"; "Ordinary Night (同じ夜 Onaji Yoru)"

Documentary
No.	Title	Length
1.	"Part One"
2.	"Part Two"
3.	"Part Three"

== Personnel ==
- Vocals, Electric bass guitar: 椎名林檎 Sheena Ringo
- Electric bass guitar: 亀田誠治 Kameda Seiji
- Electric guitar: 弥吉淳二 Yayoshi Junji
- Synthesizer and Electronic keyboard: 皆川真人 Minagawa Makoto
- Drums: 村石雅行 Muraishi Masayuki
- Strings: Gen Ittetsu's Kachiikusa Kinen Gakudan (勝ち戦記念楽団, victory memorial orchestra)

== Tour Dates ==
Date	Shi (City)	Ken (Prefecture)	Venue
April 17, 2000	Utsunomiya	Tochigi	Tochigi General Cultural Center
April 20, 2000	Kanazawa	Ishikawa	Hondanomori Hall
April 24, 2000	Niigata	Niigata	Niigata Prefectural Civic Center
April 26, 2000	Shibuya	Tokyo	NHK Hall
April 28, 2000	Shibuya	Tokyo	Shibuya Public Hall
May 13, 2000	Hiroshima	Hiroshima	ALSOK Hall
May 15, 2000	Kagoshima	Kagoshima	Kagoshima Citizen's Cultural Hall
May 18, 2000	Nagasaki	Nagasaki	Nagasaki Brick Hall
May 22, 2000	Takasaki	Gunma	Takasaki Civic Hall
May 24, 2000	Osaka	Osaka	Well City Osaka
September 9, 2000	Sendai	Miyagi	Sendai Sunplaza
May 31, 2000	Fukuoka	Fukuoka	Fukuoka Sunpalace
June 2, 2000	Nagoya	Aichi	Nagoya Public Hall
June 5, 2000	Sapporo	Hokkaido	Well City Sapporo
June 7, 2000	Morioka	Iwate	Morioka Civic Cultural Hole
