= Gunjō Biyori =

Single by Tokyo Jihen

from the album Kyōiku
- B-side: "Sono Onna Fushidara ni Tsuki"; "Kao"
- Released: September 8, 2004
- Recorded: 2004
- Genre: Alternative rock, pop-rock
- Length: 3:33
- Label: Toshiba EMI
- Songwriter: Ringo Sheena H Zetto M

Tokyo Jihen singles chronology
"Gunjō Biyori" (2004)	"Sōnan" (2004)

"Gunjō Biyori" (群青日和; "Ultramarine Weather"), also known by its English name "Ideal Days for Ultramarine", is the debut single by Japanese rock band Tokyo Jihen, led by musician Ringo Sheena. It was released on September 8, 2004, ten months after Sheena's solo single "Ringo no Uta".

== Background and development ==
Tokyo Jihen was first formed in 2003, after Ringo Sheena decided on members for her backing band for her Sugoroku Ecstasy tour. It had been Sheena's intention to release music in a band since before she debuted in 1998. The band's name was publicised during the tour, however previous tours had featured backing bands with names, such as Gyakutai Glykogen for Gekokujyo Xstasy and Hatsuiku Status.

The band was officially announced as Sheena's main musical unit on May 31, 2004, and first performed at a series of summer music festivals: Meet the World Beat 2004 on July 25, 2004 at the Expo Commemoration Park in Osaka, July 30, 2004 at the Fuji Rock Festival in Niigata, and September 3, 2004 at the Fukuoka Sunset Live festival.

== Writing and production ==
All 17 of the songs for the Kyōiku era were recorded over a period of four days. The song features lyrics by Sheena set to a melody composed by then band pianist H Zetto M. It was one of three songs from Kyōiku to be written in this style, the other two being "Genjitsu ni Oite" and "Service". The single's B-sides include a cover of the 1937 standard "The Lady Is a Tramp", and "Kao", a duet between Sheena and then guitarist Mikio Hirama, who wrote the song's music. Sheena stated that it had been "a dream of sorts" to release music that collaborated with a variety of songwriters. The single's song lengths are all palindromic, much like Sheena's album Kalk Samen Kuri no Hana (2003). Pianist H Zetto M gave Sheena a collection of demos before recording sessions started, and "Gunjō Biyori" was the first song present. Sheena felt as if he had written the song specifically for Sheena, and everything she was experiencing. "Kao" was a song Hirama initially gave Sheena during the Sugoroku Tour, though she felt she could not sing it. Eventually, the idea of singing the song as a duet was created, meaning the song became feasible.

The single package and track list are created in the same pattern as the band's next single "Sōnan". Both releases feature an English language cover of an American song popular in the 1950s, and a B-side with a single kanji title. All song lengths on both singles are palindromic numbers. Both releases' Japanese catalogue codes are also palindromic: TOCT-4884 and TOCT-4994 respectively. Both singles' covers are from the same photoshoot, both featuring a white gradient.

== Promotion and release ==
The song was used in a commercial campaign for the Sanyo-manufactured au W21SA range of cellphones. Tokyo Jihen performed the song at Count Down TV on November 27, 2004, and at Music Station on the 2004 Christmas special, aired on December 24, 2004.

The song was performed during the band's first four festival appearances in 2004, as well as their Dynamite! (2005), Domestic! Virgin Line (2006), Spa & Treatment (2007), Discovery (2011) and Bon Voyage (2012) tours. The live performance from the Dynamite Out DVD was compiled on the album Tokyo Collection (2012). The live performances at the Dynamite Out and Bon Voyage tours were released as videos to promote their respective DVDs. The B-sides were also performed by the band, "Sono Onna Fushidara ni Tsuki" at their Yamabikari, Meet the World Beat and SunSet Live 2004 festival appearances, as well as at the Domestic! Just Can't Help It (2006) tour, while "Kao" was performed during their Dynamite tour, and in a medley with "Genjitsu ni Oite" during Domestic! Just Can't Help It.

== Music video ==
A music video was filmed for the song, directed by Masaaki Uchino. It links directly into an additional video shot for the B-side "Sono Onna Fushidara ni Tsuki", which were occasionally shown together on music video channels. Both videos were made available on September 8, 2004, on Tokyo Jihen's official website. Tokyo Jihen's next single "Sōnan" also featured a music video for the song's B-side that was a continuation of the leading song's video, also directed by Uchino. It features the members of Tokyo Jihen in on a dark stage, Sheena soaked in water. As they perform the song, spotlights illuminates them. The video for "Sono Onna Fushidara ni Tsuki" is performed on the same set, and features Sheena walking amongst the other band members. The camera angle is reversed, pointing towards the spotlights and the movie cameras.

Director Uchino made the theme of the video a band's first performance, as "Gunjō Biyori" was the debut song for the band. In order to capture a sense of a "real" Sheena, Uchino soaked Sheena in water, to emulate the effect of a musician sweating during a performance.

The video won the Best Group award at the 2005 Space Shower Music Video Awards. It was also nominated for the Best Buzz Asia from Japan award at the 2004 MTV Video Music Awards Japan, however lost to Orange Range's "Locolotion".

== Critical reception ==
Listenmusic reviewer Kiyohiko Koike felt Hiizumi's melody was unlike something Sheena would create herself, however also noted the "profound lyrics based on old timey vocabulary" was a highlight, and still managed to convey Sheena's worldview. He further noted that Sheena felt at ease in the role of a vocalist. CDJournal reviewers felt the song had a slightly different image to what Sheena had in her solo career, noting that listeners could hear the enjoyment Sheena had at being able to play in a band. What's In? reviewers also noted the sense of freedom in the song present in the sound work not seen in Sheena's solo career. Reviewer Yū Onoda called the single "vivid" and the band's sound "thrilling", impressed by the "punkish arrangement" of "The Lady Is a Tramp".

== Track listing ==
No.	Title	Lyrics	Music	Length
1.	"Gunjō Biyori"	Ringo Sheena	H Zetto M	3:33
2.	"Sono Onna Fushidara ni Tsuki" (その淑女ふしだらにつき "The Lady Is a Tramp")	Lorenz Hart	Richard Rodgers	2:22
3.	"Kao" (顔 "Faces")	R. Sheena	Mikio Hirama	4:04
Total length:				10:00

== Chart rankings ==
Charts (2004)	Peak position
Japan Oricon daily singles	1
Japan Oricon weekly singles	2
Japan Oricon monthly singles	5
Japan Oricon yearly singles	42
Charts (2012)	Peak position
Japan Billboard Adult Contemporary Airplay	75
Japan Billboard Japan Hot 100	45
Japan RIAJ Digital Track Chart	46

=== Sales and certifications ===
Chart	Amount
Oricon physical sales	203,000
RIAJ physical shipping certification	Gold (100,000)
RIAJ digital certification	Gold (100,000)
RIAJ streaming certification	Gold (50,000,000)

== Release history ==
Region	Date	Format	Distributing Label	Catalogue codes
Japan	September 8, 2004	CD, digital download, rental CD	Toshiba EMI	TOCT-4884
Taiwan	September 15, 2004	CD	Gold Typhoon	86781420
