= Ringo no Uta (Ringo Sheena song) =

Single by Ringo Sheena
- B-side: "La salle de bain"; "Ringo Catalogue (Kuroko Jidai Saihen-san)"
- Released: November 25, 2003
- Recorded: 2003
- Genre: jazz; kayōkyoku; Latin
- Length: 3:29
- Label: Toshiba EMI; Virgin Music
- Songwriter: Ringo Sheena
- Producer: Ringo Sheena

Ringo Sheena singles chronology
"Stem" (2003)	"Ringo no Uta" (2003)	"Karisome Otome" (2006)

"Ringo no Uta" (りんごのうた; "A Song of Apples") is a single by Japanese musician Ringo Sheena, released on November 25, 2003. Described as a "turning point single" by Sheena, it was her final release as a solo artist before joining the band Tokyo Jihen in 2004, and her final single featuring her signature mole. The song was used in a stop-motion work created for NHK's Minna no Uta series of short animations.

== Background and development ==
In 2003 after a period of inactivity, Sheena released the album Kalk Samen Kuri no Hana led by the single "Stem". She performed a special concert, Baishō Ecstasy on the day of the album's release, February 23, 2003, and performed an 11 date tour in September 2003, Sugoroku Ecstasy. This tour featured a backing band that would become Tokyo Jihen, her main musical unit, until 2012. It had been Sheena's intention to release music in a band since before she debuted in 1998.

== Writing and production ==
The song was first written in May 2003, and was recorded along with "La salle de bain" in July. As the song was created for Minna no Uta, Sheena rendered the song's lyrics entirely in simple hiragana, including her and arranger Takayuki Hattori's names. The release was described as a turning point single (節目シングル, fushime shinguru) during promotions, a title given to her Electric Mole DVD as well. The single's release date, November 25, 2003, was Sheena's 25th birthday. On this day, she recorded a song called "Kokoro" as a present to other people, which was released on her band's single "Sōnan" 11 months later.

The B-side "La salle de bain" is a classically re-arranged version of Sheena's song "Yokushitsu" from her album Shōso Strip (2000), arranged by Neko Saito and featuring English lyrics translated by Robbie Clark. The song was originally released three months prior to the single, on the Seiteki Healing: Sono San DVD, which featured a Shuichi Banba-directed video of the song.

The final B-side "Ringo Catalogue (Kuroko Jidai Saihen-san)" is a new song created by compiling sounds from Sheena's first three albums by recording engineer Uni Inoue. The project was created after Inoue wondered if sound could be woven to create a story, like images are for films. The song's lyrics are based on B-sides from Sheena's previously released singles. The work took three weeks for Inoue to complete.

== Promotion and release ==
The song was used for NHK's Minna no Uta, an interstitial program featuring songs accompanied by usually animated family-friendly videos. The Minna no Uta video was stop-motion, featuring a 3D apple puppet called "Ringo-chan", designed by Hiroko Saito and animated by Enjin Productions.

A series of massive promotional posters were displayed in Tokyo, Osaka and Nagoya, as well as advertisements in GBM, The Television and Spa magazines, and record stores. These featured scenes from Sheena's music video "Ringo no Uta", in which she dressed up as past versions of herself. However, the posters did not feature Sheena herself, but celebrities impersonating her. "Honnō" featured actress Yasuko Tomita, "Gips" featured actress Kumiko Asō and "Stem" featured kabuki actor Nakamura Shichinosuke II.

Sheena performed the song during the final concert of her Sugoroku Ecstasy tour on September 27, 2003 at the Nippon Budokan, as the final song. She performed the song as a solo artist during her Dai Ikkai Ringohan Taikai: Adult Only concerts in December 2005, as well as the B-side "La salle de bain".

The song was covered by Takashi Obara on her piano cover album Pianism in J pop "II Hi Tabidachi" (2004).

== Tokyo Jihen version ==
The song was self-covered by Sheena's band Tokyo Jihen and is featured on their debut album Kyōiku (2004). This version's title was re-written as 林檎の唄, a mix of kanji and hiragana as opposed to the original's solely hiragana title. It was recorded along with the other 16 Kyōiku era songs over a period of four days.

The band performed their new version during the band's first three performances at festivals in July 2004, and on the music program Music Station on November 26. It was a part of the band's set-list for their first national tour, Dynamite, in early 2005. The final performance of the song by the band was at their Countdown Japan performance in December 2006. The band performed the B-side "La salle de bain" during their Fuji Rock Festival and SunSet Live festival performances in July and September 2004. The song was added to Kyōiku to make it easier for fans of Sheena's solo era to accept her transition into becoming a member of Tokyo Jihen.

== Music video ==
A music video was filmed for the song, directed by Shuichi Banba. It features Sheena re-performing scenes from music videos in her earlier career using outfits and cosmetics, while singing "Ringo no Uta". Sheena dressed as the characters from "Kōfukuron" (1998), "Kabukichō no Joō" (1998), "Koko de Kiss Shite." (1999), "Honnō" (1999), "Tsumi to Batsu" (2000), "Gips" (2000) and "Yattsuke Shigoto" (2000). During the song's instrumental, the kimono-wearing character from "Tsumiki Asobi" (1999) appears, and each previous character stands on a black line. The camera flies along the line and through each character's cheek mole. The next scenes feature Sheena as the character from "Mayonaka wa Junketsu" (2001), however this time in live action, unlike the animated original. After Sheena as the geisha from "Stem" (2003) appears, the scene fades to a simple, grey-haired shot of Sheena as her mole disappears.

== Critical reception ==
CDJournal reviewers called the song addictive, praising Sheena's lyricism and the "jazz taste sound". They described the song as "jazz kayō", and noted the melody was distinctly Sheena-like. They described the B-side "La salle de bain" as a "spectacle tune" from a fantastic film, and praised how the sound interacted with Sheena's vocals, noting how over-orchestration did not drown out the song. They noted progressive rock-like qualities in the song. The final B-side "Ringo Catalogue" was described as a "pop-rock tune", and the compilation not being simply stitched together was praised. However, reviewers found the bonus content on the DVD as unnecessary.

== Commercial reception ==
As the song was released on an irregular date, it debuted at number 8 on Oricon's single's chart after charting for a single day, selling 22,000 copies. In its second week, 49,000 copies were sold, making the release the number two single of that week, underneath Mr. Children's "Tenohira/Kurumi". Eventually, the release charted for thirteen weeks in the top 200 singles.

== Track listing ==
No.	Title	Writer(s)	Arranger	Length
1.	"Ringo no Uta"	Ringo Sheena	Takayuki Hattori	3:29
2.	"La salle de bain"	R. Sheena, Robbie Clark	Neko Saito	4:07
3.	"Ringo Catalogue (Kuroko Jidai Saihensan)" (リンゴカタログ～黒子時代再編纂～ "A History of the Mole Era")	R. Sheena	Uni Inoue	4:48
Total length:				12:23

DVD
No.	Title	Director	Length
1.	"Ringo no Uta"	Shuichi Banba, Masaaki Matsumoto
2.	"Omake Eizō: Unplugged Mole" (おまけ映像 "bonus video")	S. Banba, M. Matsumoto

== Personnel ==
Personnel details were sourced from "Ringo no Uta"'s liner notes booklet.

Visuals and imagery

- Daisuke Iga – styling
- Yutaka Kimura – jacket design
- Shinji Konishi – hair, make-up
- Shoji Uchida – photography

Technical and production

- Ichiko Furukawa – post-production
- Bernie Grundman – mastering
- Uni Inoue – re-editing (#3), recording, operating
- Harutomo Kawazura – recording assistant (#1, #3)
- Jiro Nakajima – recording assistant (#1-2)
- Makoto Tonosu – additional post-production

Performers and musicians

- Masato Abe – horn (#2)
- Masahiro Aizawa – flute (#2)
- Sumiharu Arima – horn (#2)
- Tomoyuki Asakawa – harp (#2)
- Ryota Fujii – trombone (#2)
- Osamu Fukui – bassoon (#2)
- Great Sakaeda strings – strings (#2)
- Takayuki Hattori – conductor (#1)
- Yuri Iguchi – trombone (#2)
- Shoko Ikeda – oboe (#2)
- Masato Kawase – Latin percussion (#1)
- Yoichi Murata – trombone (#2)
- Takashi Nakayama – trumpet (#2)
- Yoshimitsu Okuno – trumpet (#2)
- Rush Strings – strings (#1)
- Takato Saijo – horn (#2)
- Neko Saito – conductor (#2)
- Shigeharu Sasago – classical guitar (#1)
- Kensuke Sato – flute (#2)
- Kiyoshi Sato – tuba (#2)
- Yoshiaki Sato – accordion (#1)
- Ringo Sheena – vocals
- Naoki "Taro" Suzuki – synthesizer operator (#1)
- Yuko Taguchi – harp (#1)
- Midori Takada – classical music percussion (#2), timpani (#1)
- Osamu Takahashi – trumpet (#2)
- Masashi Togame – clarinet (#2)
- Hirofumi Wada – horn (#2)
- Naoki Watanabe – bass (#1)

=== Tokyo Jihen edition ===
Personnel details were sourced from Kyōiku's liner notes booklet.

- Ichiko Furukawa – mastering
- Toshiki Hata – drums, claps
- Mikio Hirama – guitar, claps
- H Zetto M – piano, claps
- Daisuke Iga – styling
- Uni Inoue – recording, editing
- Seiji Kameda – bass, claps
- Yuji Kamijō – recording assistant
- Yutaka Kimura – photography, design
- Shinji Konishi – hair, make-up
- Ringo Sheena – vocals, claps
- Makoto Tonosu – additional mastering

== Charts and sales ==
Chart (2003)	Peak position
Japan Oricon weekly singles	2
Japan Oricon yearly singles	85

=== Sales and certifications ===
Chart	Amount
Oricon physical sales	114,000
RIAJ physical shipping certification	Gold (100,000+)

== Release history ==
Region	Date	Format	Distributing Label	Catalogue codes
Japan	November 25, 2003	CCCD/DVD, digital download, rental CD	Toshiba EMI	TOCT-4774
Taiwan	November 25, 2003	CD/DVD	Gold Typhoon	55372703
South Korea	November 25, 2003	digital download	Universal Music Korea	—N/a
Japan	July 2, 2008	CD/DVD	EMI Music Japan	TOCT-40198
