= Honno =

The word Honno can refer to several things, including:

- Honno (publisher), Welsh women's press, established in 1986
- Honnō (Ringo Sheena song), a 1999 single by the Japanese singer Ringo Sheena
- Lost Sex (Honno), a 1966 Japanese film

== See also ==
- Honnō (disambiguation)
