= Honnō =

Honnō, Honnou, or, according to circumstances, Honno is a Japanese word (noun), and is divided into two meanings by the difference in a kanji.

- 本能 means instinct, the inherent inclination of a living organism towards a particular complex behavior
- 本納 is the place name of Honnō, Mobara-shi, Chiba where Honnō Station stands

本能 may also refer to follows:

== Music ==
- "Honnō" (Ringo Sheena song), Japanese singer Ringo Sheena's 4th single and it was released on October 27, 1999 by Toshiba EMI / East World

== See also ==
- Honno (disambiguation)
