= Newton's apple =

"Newton's apple" may refer to:

- Isaac Newton's apple analogy of gravitation
- Newton's Apple, the 1983–1998 educational television program
- Flower of Kent, reputed to be the apple cultivar that inspired Isaac Newton's apple analogy of gravitation
- Apple of Universal Gravity, a 2019 compilation album by Japanese musician Ringo Sheena, which has the Japanese title Newton no Ringo, or "Newton's Apple"
