= Electric Mole =

Concert tour by Shiina Ringo

- Blu-ray edition cover.

Video Live DVD by Ringo Sheena
- Released: December 17, 2003
- Recorded: September 27, 2003
- Genre: J-pop, Live
- Length: 120 minutes
- Label: EMI Music Japan/Virgin Music
- Producer: Inoue Uni

Ringo Sheena chronology
Seiteki Healing ~Sono-San~	Electric Mole	Dai Ikkai Ringohan Taikai no Moyou

Sugoroku Ecstasy
- Tour by Ringo Sheena
- Start date: August 23, 2003
- End date: September 21, 2003; September 27, 2003 (additional concert)
- No. of shows: 10 (+1)

Ringo Sheena concert chronology
- Baishou Ecstasy; Sugoroku Ecstasy; Ringo EXPO 08

"Electric Mole (エレクトリック・モール)" is a concert video recorded on Ringo Sheena's nationwide "Sugoroku Ecstasy (雙六エクスタシー, Sugoroku Ecstasy)" tour in the summer of 2003. The DVD was released on December 17, 2003, by distributor Toshiba EMI/Virgin Music.

The first pressing of the DVD was available as a special limited edition, entitled "Hardcover Karakuri Book Shiyou (ハードカバー・カラクリ・ブック仕様, Hardcover Trick Book Style)" and included a book attached to the DVD case which included a photographic history of Sheena's life and musical activities over the past five years, as well as bonus video content on the DVD.

== Outline ==
"Electric Mole" is a recording of the final concert of Sheena's nationwide 2003 "Sugoroku Ecstasy (雙六エクスタシー, Sugoroku Ecstasy)" tour, held at the Nippon Budokan. The concert showcases a variety of songs from her debut album, Muzai Moratorium, sophomore album Shōso Strip, and cover album Utaite Myōri: Sono Ichi.

Midway through the concert, footage cuts to a different night's performance, skipping the songs "Kōfukuron" and "Ringo no Uta", the debut of the latter, which were played live but did not make it onto the concert DVD. Consequently, some fans expressed disappointment with the way the footage was edited for the DVD.

As background video displayed during the concert shows Sheena's trademark mole disappearing from her left cheek, the DVD's title of "Electric Mole" is assumed to refer to this, and the way she later had the mole surgically removed in the winter of 2003.

== Tracklist ==
No.	Title	Length
1.	"Toshiba-EMI Logo"
2.	"A View of Happiness" (joy version; excerpt)
3.	"Crime and Punishment"
4.	"Chastity at Midnight"
5.	"Talk"
6.	"Doppelganger" (ドツペルゲンガー Dopperugengā)
7.	"Documentary 1"
8.	"As You Wish" (part one; おこのみで（前） Okonomi de (mae))
9.	"Documentary 2"
10.	"As You Wish" (part two; おこのみで（後） Okonomi de (ato))
11.	"Consciously" (意識 Ishiki)
12.	"Documentary 3"
13.	"Slide" (すべりだい Suberidai)
14.	"Manhã de Carnaval" (黒いオルフェ Kuroi Orufe)
15.	"Band Members' Introduction" (video clip; メンバー紹介映像 Menbā shōkai eizō)
16.	"Documentary 4"
17.	"Marunouchi Sadistic"
18.	"Caution" (警告 Keikoku)
19.	"Delayed Brain" (excerpt; Number Girl cover)
20.	"Worrying Unnecessarily" (とりこし苦労 Torikoshigurō)
21.	"Documentary 5"
22.	"Talk"
23.	"Minatomachi 13 ban-chi" (港町十三番地; Misora Hibari cover)
24.	"Poltergeists" (ポルターガイスト Porutāgaisuto)
25.	"Milestone Video Clip 1"
26.	"Gips"
27.	"Documentary 6"
28.	"Camouflage" (迷彩 Meisai)
29.	"Stem"
30.	"Documentary 7"
31.	"Shiroi Hana no Saku Koro" (excerpt; 白い花の咲く頃; Atsuo Okamoto cover)
32.	"Mr. Wonderful"
33.	"Correct City" (正しい街 Tadashii Machi)
34.	"Milestone Video Clip 2"
35.	"Documentary 8"
36.	"Please Take Care" (おだいじに Odaiji ni)
37.	"Milestone Video Clip 3"
38.	"Documentary 9"
39.	"A Song of Apples" (excerpt)

== Sugoroku Ecstasy ==
"Shiina Ringo Jitsuen Tour (椎名林檎 実演ツアー, Shiina Ringo Stage Show Tour) Sugoroku Ecstasy (雙六エクスタシー, Sugoroku Ecstasy)" is the third nationwide concert tour by Ringo Sheena. The tour was in support of her third album, Kalk Samen Kuri no Hana, though she performed material from her first two albums extensively, and spanned eight cities in prefectures across Japan, namely Tokyo, Aichi, Hiroshima, Hyougo, Kyoto, Hokkaido, Fukuoka and Okinawa. Two tour dates each were held in Tokyo and Fukuoka, for a total of ten. The tour initially spanned August 23 to September 21, with the final Budokan concert on September 27 added at the end.

This tour is characterized by a greater inclusion of cover songs than any of her past concerts.

A special limited edition Duesenberg DSR-SR Ringo Sheena model guitar, nicknamed the "Ichimatsu (市松, Check Pattern)" and patterned after Sheena's signature model electric guitar, was produced for sale by "Duesenberg Guitars" to commemorate the fifth anniversary of her debut.

=== Tour Dates ===
Date	City	Prefecture	Venue
August 23, 2003	Shibuya	Tokyo	Shibuya Public Hall
August 24, 2003	Shibuya	Tokyo	Shibuya Public Hall
August 27, 2003	Nagoya	Aichi	Nagoya Civic Hall
August 30, 2003	Hiroshima	Hiroshima	Wel-City Hiroshima
September 1, 2003	Kobe	Hyōgo	Kobe International Hall
September 3, 2003	Kyoto	Kyoto	Kyoto Kaikan First Hall
September 9, 2003	Hakodate	Hokkaido	Hakodate Civic Hall
September 16, 2003	Fukuoka	Fukuoka	Fukuoka Sunpalace
September 17, 2003	Fukuoka	Fukuoka	Fukuoka Sunpalace
September 21, 2003	Ginowan	Okinawa	Okinawa Convention Center
Additional concert
September 27, 2003	Chiyoda	Tokyo	Nippon Budokan

=== Backing Band ===
This tour marks the formation of the band that would later be known as "Tokyo Jihen (東京事変, Tokyo Incidents)", although the members served as Sheena's backing band and were not formally introduced until the conclusion of the tour.

Tour members' names were written out in katakana with the exclusion of the final character. For example, keyboard player H ZHETT M's name was rendered as "ヒイズミ マサユ機" (Hiizumi Masayuki).

- Vocals, Electric bass guitar: シーナ リン湖 Sheena Ringo
- Electric bass guitar: カメダ セー時 Kameda Seiji
- Electric guitar: ヒラマ ミキ緒 Hirama Mikio
- Piano: ヒーズミ マサユ季 Hiizumi Masayuki
- Drums: ハタ トシ樹 Hata Toshiki
