= Hatsuiku Status: Gokiritsu Japon =

Hatsuiku Status Gokiritsu Japon
- DVD edition cover.

Video (Live VHS, Live DVD) by Ringo Sheena
- Released: December 7, 2000
- Recorded: July 8, 2000
- Genre: J-pop, Live
- Length: 50 minutes
- Label: EMI Music Japan
- Producer: Inoue Uni

Ringo Sheena chronology
| Seiteki Healing ~Sono-Ni~ | Hatsuiku Status Gokiritsu Japon | Tanpen Kinema Hyaku-Iro Megane |

Hatsuiku Status Gokiritsu Japon
- Tour by Ringo Sheena
- Start date: June 27, 2000
- End date: July 8, 2000
- No. of shows: 4

Ringo Sheena concert chronology
- Gekokujou Xstasy; Hatsuiku Status Gokiritsu Japon; Zazen Xstasy

"Hatsuiku Status Gokiritsu Japon (発育ステータス 御起立ジャポン, Growth Status - Stand Up Japan)" is the secret rock bar tour which Ringo Sheena performed in a band in 2000, or is the live video with the same title as this tour by Sheena released on December 7, 2000. This video was released with the video of "Gekokujou Xstasy (下剋上エクスタシー, Usurpation Ecstasy)". The distributor is Toshiba EMI.

== Outline ==
Sheena went on this tour in the name of the "Hatsuiku Status" which is the band name instead of in the name of "Ringo Sheena" at the beginning. This band and the songs performed on this tour were named using the word relevant to child-care, botany, or gardening.

This video records the live at the Shinjuku liquid room on July 8 with the image of other performance at four places, and the documentaries about the process of the music production, and so on.

== Track listing ==
Documentary
the process of the music production and the practice scene

Live

1. Hatsuga (発芽, Germination)
2. Warui Nae Yoi Moe (悪い苗 良い萠, Bad Seedling, Good Sprouting)
3. Gaichuu Kujo (害虫駆除, Extermination of Harmful Insects)
4. Takai Takai (たかいたかい, High High)
5. Haenuki (生え抜き, Trueborn)
6. Sakasetemite (咲かせてみて, Let me bloom)
7. Konya Dou (今夜だふ, How about tonight?)
8. Mebana yue Obana (雌花 故 雄花, Male flower because of Female flower)
9. Kougousei (光合成, Photosynthesis)

Secret
After the end roll, the scene on which the band members chat while eating sweets is projected soon.

- All lyrics by Ringo Sheena, and track 2 is with Hatsuiku Status.
- All music by Ringo Sheena, and track 2 is with Torii Yasunobu, 4 is with Murata junko, 7 is with Tabuchi Hisako.
- All arrangements by Hatsuiku Status.

== Hatsuiku Status ==
Hatsuiku Status (発育ステータス, Growth Status) is the unusual band including three bassists which Ringo Sheena formed with her friends. Many of songs which they played were connected with "growth" of their band name, and they were named in relation to the growth of the plant. This band halted activity by going on the nationwide tour only once.

=== Personnel ===
- Vocals, electric bass guitar: 椎名林檎 Ringo Sheena
- Electric bass guitar: 村田純子 Junko Murata (from Hachioji Gulliver which Sheena formed with her in her amateur days)
- Electric guitar: 田渕ひさ子 Hisako Tabuchi (from Number Girl, toddle, Bloodthirsty Butchers)
- Electric bass guitar: 鳥井泰伸 Yasunobu Torii (from Panicsmile, Gaji)
- Drums: 吉村由加 Yuka Yoshimura (Catsuomaticdeath, Metalchicks, ex. DMBQ, ex. Hydro-Guru, ex. OOIOO, ex. Mensu)

== Gokiritsu Japon ==
"Gokiritsu Japon (御起立ジャポン, Stand Up Japan)" is the title of the tour by Hatsuiku Status in 2000.

=== Tour Schedule ===
- June 27, Ringo Sheena Hatsuiku Status @ Fukuoka Drum Logos "Gokiritsu Japon - Hatsuiku Status vs Rolettasecohan"
- June 29, Ringo Sheena Hatsuiku Status @ Hiroshima Namiki Junction "Gokiritsu Japon - Hatsuiku Status vs Dosanko Anal"
- July 4, Ringo Sheena Hatsuiku Status @ Kobe Chicken George "Gokiritsu Japon - Hatsuiku Status vs Elephant Morning Call"
- July 8, Ringo Sheena Hatsuiku Status @ Shinjuku liquid room "Gokiritsu Japon - Hatsuiku Status vs Handsome Brothers"

=== Set list ===
Hatsuiku Status performed 4 times, but the set lists were all the same.

1. Hatsuga (発芽, Germination)
2. Warui Nae Yoi Moe (悪い苗 良い萠, Bad Seedling, Good Sprouting)
3. Gaichuu Kujo (害虫駆除, Extermination of Harmful Insects)
4. Haenuki (生え抜き, Trueborn)
5. Fukurande kichatta (膨らんできちゃった, It has swollen)
6. Hai Hai (はいはい, Crawling)
7. Takai Takai (たかいたかい, High High)
8. Sakasetemite (咲かせてみて, Let me bloom)
9. Konya Dou (今夜だふ, How about tonight?)
10. Mebana yue Obana (雌花 故 雄花, Male flower because of Female flower)
11. Kougousei (光合成, Photosynthesis)
