= Marunouchi Sadistic =

1999 song by Ringo Sheena

Song by Ringo Sheena

from the album Muzai Moratorium
- Released: 1999
- Recorded: 1998
- Genre: Pop rock; alternative rock
- Length: 3:56
- Label: Toshiba EMI, EMI Music Japan, Universal
- Songwriter: Ringo Sheena
- Producer: Ringo Sheena

"Marunouchi Sadistic" (丸の内サディスティック, Marunouchi Sadisutikku) is a song composed and written by Japanese rock singer-songwriter multi-instrumentalist Ringo Sheena. It was recorded for her debut album Muzai Moratorium in 1999.

== Background ==
Ringo Sheena released her debut single "Kōfukuron" in May 1998, followed by "Kabukichō no Joō" in September. Her third in January 1999, "Koko de Kiss Shite.", became a hit, being certified platinum for 200,000 copies shipped to stores by the RIAJ. This was followed by her debut album Muzai Moratorium in February 1999, an album that was wildly successful, selling over 1,000,000 copies since its release.

A small section of the song was first released on the "Kabukichō no Joō" single, on the track "Jitsuroku (Shinjuku nite)" (実録 －新宿にて－; "Actual Recording (In Shinjuku)") , which featured a clip of Sheena busking in Tokyo, performing a medley of "Marunouchi Sadistic" and "Kabukichō no Joō".

== Writing and production ==
"Marunouchi Sadistic"
Ringo Sheena mentions many places on the Marunouchi Line and guitar paraphernalia in the song. This wordplay was praised by critics.

The song was first recorded in an English language demo called "A New Way to Fly", which was recorded while Sheena was home-staying in London.

The lyrics talk somebody who has just moved to Tokyo for work, and the title references the Marunouchi Line, one of the major train lines in central Tokyo, as well as several neighbourhoods reached on the line, such as Ochanomizu and Ginza. The song also mentions many guitar-related words, such as the Rickenbacker 620 model guitar, Marshall amplifiers, a Pro Co RAT pedal amplifier and Gretsch guitars. Blankey Jet City vocalist Kenichi "Benji" Asai is mentioned in the lyric, "And then Benji hit me with the Gretsch" (そしたらベンジー、あたしをグレッチで殴って, Soshitara Benjī, atashi o gurecchi de butte) The 2008 English lyrics similarly keep the references to places in Tokyo and to guitar paraphernalia, but further mentions Kurt Cobain and Nirvana.

A special band called Zekkyō Solfeggio (絶叫ソルフェージュ, Scream Solfeggio) was created to record the song, composed of Sheena, producer Seiji Kameda and drummer Noriyasu Kawamura. The bulk of the other songs recorded for Muzai Moratorium were performed by the bands Momoiro Spanner and Zetsurin Hectopascal, which both featured Sheena, Kameda and Kawamura as members, including other musicians.

For Sheena's 10th anniversary concerts, Ringo Expo 08, a rearranged bilingual version called "Marunouchi Sadistic (Expo Ver.)" was featured as exiting music after the concert. This version was released as a bonus track on her album Sanmon Gossip (2009).

== Live performances ==
"Marunouchi Sadistic" is one of the most consistently performed songs in Sheena's career. It was performed at her early live concerts: at NHK Live Beat (1999), her Senkō Ecstasy tour (1999), her Jisaku Jien Namaensōkai concerts (1999), Kōkotsu Gokuhi Ensōkai (1999) and her Manabiya Ecstasy tour. Performances can be seen on her live DVDs Gekokujyo Xstasy (2000), Electric Mole (2003), and Tōtaikai (2014). The version performed at Tōtaikai was titled with the symbol ㋚ (pronounced "Maru Sa", the first syllables of the two words that make up the title). The symbol is a pun, as it features a katakana "sa" surrounded by a circle (maru in Japanese).

From 2004 to 2012, Ringo Sheena's main musical unit was the band Tokyo Jihen. While the band mostly performed their own music, several songs from Sheena's solo career were performed. "Marunouchi Sadistic" was performed at almost every Tokyo Jihen concert, and became the most performed song by the band. Live performances can be found on the band's DVDs Dynamite Out (2004), Just Can't Help It. (2006), Spa & Treatment (2010), Ultra C (2010) and Bon Voyage (2012). The Just Can't Help It. performance was included on the band's live recording compilation album Tokyo Collection (2012).

== Music video ==
A special music video was produced for Tokyo Jihen's DVD Chin Play Kō Play (2012) called "Makunouchi Sadistic" (幕ノ内サディスティック; "Intermission Sadistic"), directed by Hiroshi Usui. It featured scenes of all of the performances of the song at Tokyo Jihen's concerts edited into a single clip.

== Critical reception ==
In a survey taken conducted by Recochoku in 2011 asking users what they thought Ringo Sheena's signature songs were, "Marunouchi Sadistic" ranked in as the fifth.

The Rolling Thunder Review, a website that almost exclusively reviews Western rock albums, wrote a review of Muzai Moratorium. The reviewers highly praised the word-play in "Marunouchi Sadistic"'s lyrics, stating that "I can only think that God lived in this song." CDJournal reviewers called the song "real", and described the song as "A crazy Marunouchi office lady, using wordplay expressing her heart, decadently singing at the top of her voice."

== Cover versions ==
"Marunouchi Sadistic" has been covered extensively since its release. The first time was in May 2008, when it was covered for the 112th episode of The Idolmaster's radio program for Radio Osaka, by voice actresses Naomi Wakabayashi, Chiaki Takahashi and Asami Imai, The Idolmaster Radio. This was released on CD on March 25, 2009. Jazz flugelhorn player Ryuichiro Tonozuka also covered it on his instrumental album Top Gear (2008). Enka singer Fuyumi Sakamoto and pop/jazz singer Juju performed the song together for the Fuji TV music program Bokura no Ongaku on April 2, 2010.

In 2012, Kyoto rock band Unchain released a cover of the song as a digital download, which was then included on their cover album Love & Groove Delivery (2013). The song was also covered as a punk version, by Hiroshima girls band Rondonrats on their album Punk Eats Girl Pop (2012).

In singer-songwriter Shiori Niiyama's audition for music company Being Inc. in 2012, she covered the song. She continues to perform covers of the song at live events, such as her first live tour Shiorigoto in 2014.

Singer-songwriter Hirotaka Mori sung the song as a duet with Angela Aki at his October 20, 2013 Jam Addict concert at Minami Aoyama Mandala in Tokyo.

== Hikaru Utada and Nariaki Obukuro version ==
"Marunouchi Sadistic"

Single by Hikaru Utada and Nariaki Obukuro

from the album Adam to Eve no Ringo
- Language: Japanese
- Released: May 23, 2018
- Genre: Soul; lounge jazz
- Length: 4:41
- Label: Epic; Sony Music Japan
- Songwriter: Ringo Sheena
- Producers: Utada Hikaru, Nariaki Obukuro

Hikaru Utada and Nariaki Obukuro singles chronology
"Play a Love Song" (2018)	"Marunouchi Sadistic" (2018)	"Hatsukoi" (2018)

In March 2017, singer-songwriter Hikaru Utada covered the EXPO Version with singer and producer Nariaki Obukuro in the J-Wave Radio show MUSIC HUB. Both artists were requested by Ringo to do a new studio version of the song in Sheena Ringo's tribute album, Adam to Eve no Ringo. The cover has a soulful, lounge jazz sound. It was released as a promotional single for the tribute album in Japan.

Recording credits:

- Drums and percussion: Chris Dave
- Bass: Jodi Milliner
- Guitar: Ben Parker
- Piano: Reuben James
- Producers: Hikaru Utada and Nariaki Obukuro
- Recording and mixing: Steve Fitzmaurice at RAK Studios and Pierce Room
- Additional vocals recording: Masahito Komori at Metropolis Studios
- Additional engineering: Darren Heelis

== Personnel ==
Credits are adapted from liner notes of Muzai Moratorium and Sanmon Gossip.

Original version

- Seiji Kameda – bass guitar, backing vocal
- Noriyasu Kawamura – drums, backing vocal, handclap, footsteps
- Ringo Sheena – vocals, acoustic piano, melodica, handclap, footsteps

Expo version

- Uni Inoue – programming
- Jungo Miura (Petrolz) – bass
- Ringo Sheena – vocals
- Ukigumo – chorus

== Charts ==
Chart (2011)	Peak position
Japan RIAJ Digital Track Chart	87
Chart (2019)	Peak position
Japan Billboard Japan Hot 100	34

== Certifications ==
Region	Certification	Certified units/sales
Japan (RIAJ)	Platinum	250,000^{*}
Streaming
Japan (RIAJ)	2× Platinum	200,000,000^{†}
^{*} Sales figures based on certification alone.^{†} Streaming-only figures based on certification alone.
