= Gips (song) =

2000 single by Ringo Sheena

Single by Ringo Sheena

from the album Shōso Strip
- Released: January 26, 2000
- Genre: Rock, pop, kayōkyoku
- Length: 11:34
- Label: Toshiba EMI / Virgin Music
- Songwriters: Ringo Sheena, Michio Yamagami, Kenji Sawada
- Producer: Uni Inoue

Ringo Sheena singles chronology
"Honnō" (1999)	"Gips" (2000)	"Mayonaka wa Junketsu" (2001)

"Gips" (ギブス, Gibusu; "Orthopedic cast") is Japanese singer Ringo Sheena's 5th single and it was released on January 26, 2000, by Toshiba EMI / Virgin Music. The single was certified double platinum by the RIAJ for 800,000 copies shipped to stores and later gold for 100,000 downloads to cellphones in 2010.

== Background ==
Gips is taken from Sheena's second album Shōso Strip. Sheena was compelled to release two songs at the same time after all, she was going to release this song and Tsumi to Batsu separately first, though. Hisako Tabuchi, the guitarist of Number Girl, plays the guitar on Σ.

The song was covered as a part of a medley by Rie Tomosaka on the television show The Yoru mo Hippare on September 9, 2000. It was also performed by Mino Kabasawa on her piano cover album Piano Pure: Memory of 2000 and by Kazumasa Oda on the TBS music program Christmas no Yakusoku 2002 on December 25, 2001. In 2009, it was covered by Marié Digby on her album Second Home and by Juju on her cover album Request. In 2012, it was released as a single by Ms. Ooja, and appeared on her album Woman: Love Song Covers.

== Track listing ==
CD
No.	Title	Lyrics	Music	Arranger(s)	Length
1.	"Gips" (from Shōso Strip)	Ringo Sheena	Ringo Sheena	Seiji Kameda & Ringo Sheena	5:38
2.	"Tokyo no Hito (東京の女, Tokyo Lady)" (The Peanuts cover)	Michio Yamagami	Kenji Sawada	Seiji Kameda & Ringo Sheena	2:49
3.	"Σ (Sigma)"	Ringo Sheena	Ringo Sheena	Seiji Kameda & Ringo Sheena	3:14
Total length:					11:34

== Chart rankings ==
Chart (2000)	Peak position
Japan Oricon weekly singles	3
Chart (2011)	Peak position
Japan RIAJ Digital Track Chart	46

=== Sales and certifications ===
Chart	Amount
Oricon physical sales	714,000
RIAJ physical certification	2× Platinum (800,000)
RIAJ cellphone download certification	Gold (100,000)

== Credits and personnel ==
Gips

- Vocals: Ringo Sheena
- Guitars: Susumu Nishikawa
- Bass guitars: Seiji Kameda
- Piano: Yuta Saito
- Drums and Tambourines: Noriyasu "Kāsuke" Kawamura
- Synthesizer programming: Nobuhiko Nakayama, Hiroshi Kitashiro

Tokyo no Hito

- Vocals, Electric guitars: Ringo Sheena
- Electric guitars: Susumu Nishikawa
- Bass guitars: Seiji Kameda
- Drums: Masayuki Muraishi
- Organ: Yuta Saito

Σ

- Vocals, Electric guitars: Ringo Sheena
- Electric guitars: Hisako Tabuchi
- Bass guitars: Seiji Kameda
- Synthesizer programming: Nobuhiko Nakayama
- Turntables: moOog yamamOTO (from Buffalo Daughter)

== Music video cast ==
Gips

- Vocal & Electric guitar: Ringo Sheena
- Electric guitar: Makoto Totani (from Milk Crown, Thinners)
- Electric bass guitar: Eikichi Iwai (from Chirinuruwowaka)
- Synthesizer, Keyboard instrument: Makoto Minagawa (from Thinners, Sparky)
- Drums: Hisashi Nishikawa (he is Sheena 's friend and is an amateur)

Σ

- Takeshi Hara
- Yuka Yoshimura
- Hisako Tabuchi
- Seiji Kameda
