= Muzai Moratorium =

Muzai Moratorium 無罪モラトリアム

Studio album by Ringo Sheena
- Released: February 24, 1999
- Recorded: Studio Terra; Kame-chan Studio B main
- Genre: Pop rock; alternative rock
- Length: 41:00
- Label: Toshiba EMI; Eastworld
- Producer: Hiroshi Kitashiro

Ringo Sheena chronology
Muzai Moratorium 無罪モラトリアム (1999)	Shōso Strip (2000)

Singles from Muzai Moratorium
- 1. "Kōfukuron" Released: May 27, 1998; 2. "Kabukichō no Joō" Released: September 9, 1998; 3. "Koko de Kiss Shite." Released: January 20, 1999

Muzai Moratorium (無罪モラトリアム), also known as Innocence Moratorium, is the debut studio album by Japanese singer-songwriter Ringo Sheena, released on February 24, 1999, through Toshiba EMI and Eastworld. Sheena composed nearly all the songs on this album in her teenage years, prior to her major-label debut. The album was produced by Hiroshi Kitashiro and Sheena herself, with arrangements that defy genre boundaries.

The album features an eclectic mix of pop music from the past to the time of its release, including pop songs, punk, grunge, and jazz. Both the album and song titles combine kanji and English, and the lyrics are written using English and historical kana usage. Music critics were impressed by the album’s eclectic fusion of styles. Viewing the arrangements as daring and sophisticated, with unexpected shifts in tempo and instrumentation that challenged conventional pop formulas.

Commercially, the album was a major success, debuting at number two on the Oricon Albums Chart, selling over 1.4 million copies and eventually being certified triple platinum by the Recording Industry Association of Japan (RIAJ). It spawned the three hit singles "Kōfukuron," "Kabukichō no Joō," and "Koko de Kiss Shite.," each of which contributed to Sheena's rising stardom and cemented her reputation as a boundary-pushing artist. Sheena supported the album through a series of live performances and public appearances throughout Japan in 1999.

== Background ==
In 1996, while working part-time, Ringo Sheena entered the Fukuoka regional round of the 5th MUSIC QUEST JAPAN competition with her band. However, officials from the event encouraged her to pursue a solo career. She then participated in the national finals—MUSIC QUEST JAPAN FINAL—as “Ringo Sheena,” performing “Koko de Kiss Shite.” and winning an Excellence Award.

During the regional qualifiers, several record labels expressed interest in her, and she ultimately chose to sign with Toshiba EMI (now Universal Music Japan). She also developed personal and professional relationships with fellow finalists, including Aiko, who also won an Excellence Award, and Takashi Taniguchi, who won the Grand Prix.

From January to March of 1997, Sheena spent three months in the United Kingdom on a homestay, relying on personal connections. During that time, she had a conflict with staff at EMI’s headquarters. This experience led her to reflect deeply, and ultimately she decided to make her debut in Japan, returning home with renewed determination.

== Development and production ==
When preparations for the album began, Masahiro Shinogi—then the production director at Toshiba EMI, who had taken on more of a producer-like role—chose to bring in an experienced external director to oversee the work in his place. However, the external director, insisting that the material required extensive revisions, clashed fiercely with Sheena, who rejected the idea outright. Shinogi himself felt an unprecedented unease with Sheena’s lyrics and compositions, and at first sided with the external director. Yet he began to wonder if perhaps this discomfort was simply the result of his own aging—that he could no longer accept the music of the younger generation. He came to think that this very unease might actually signal the arrival of something radically transformative. Concluding that Ringo Sheena’s individuality could only be realized by abandoning conventional methods of direction, he decided to give her complete freedom. He entrusted the entire process to Sheena and arranger/bassist Seiji Kameda, leaving the two of them to carry the project forward.

At the time, Sheena was still a teenager, and she understood that as a brand-new debut artist she wouldn’t be given a generous budget. So she chose to record with a straightforward band sound, with the members assembled by Seiji Kameda according to her wishes. Trusting in both the performers and the songs, they avoided locking the arrangements too tightly and instead let the music take shape through free-form sessions. The method they adopted was “one-take band recording,” capturing and packaging the atmosphere of the studio exactly as it was.

In the recording sessions, they mainly adopted the method of organizing two different bands and switching between them depending on the song. Sheena wanted to highlight the differences in sound that would naturally emerge from the distinct personalities of each guitarist. Having always worked within bands up to that point, the band sound was what felt most familiar to her. Yet both musically and lyrically, she didn’t want to confine herself to that alone—her aim was to create an “anything goes” atmosphere. So whenever she felt it was necessary, she didn’t insist on sticking to the band format and freely incorporated strings and other elements as well.

== Composition and content ==
Muzai Moratorium consists of 11 full-length songs. The album incorporates elements of pop rock, alternative rock, grunge, jazz, and classical, going far beyond the boundaries of J-pop at the time. Because the budget was limited, many tracks were recorded in simple band arrangements using “one-take” recording, capturing the atmosphere of the studio as it was.

The opening track "Tadashii Machi" mention place names in Fukuoka (Momochihama and the Muromi River), and the song conveys feelings toward her hometown along with distorted memories. "Kabukichō no Joō," with lyrics set in Shinjuku’s Kabukichō district, became one of her representative songs, solidifying her then catchphrase “Shinjuku-style self-produced performer.” "Marunouchi Sadistic" is a pop number depicting the decadent image of office ladies in Tokyo’s Marunouchi district. It is characterized by playful rhymes and includes a reference to Kenichi Asai of Blankey Jet City. "Kōfukuron (Etsuraku-hen)" is a different version from the single, in which sincere and pure lyrics are sung with a bluesy atmosphere. "Akane Sasu, Kiro Terasaredo..." is a mid-tempo number, which was produced while she was living in her hometown of Fukuoka.

"Sid To Hakuchuumu" is a track with fantastical lyrics and an alternative sound. "Tsumiki Asobi" is a song that uses building blocks as a metaphor for the instability of human relationships. "Koko de Kiss Shite." is a maddeningly sad love song that fully showcases her unique lyrics, the way she stretches out words, and vibrato. "Onaji Yoru" is a calm ballad with a distinctive violin intro. "Keikoku" is a track with an aggressive sound. The last song on the album "Morphine" has a slightly languid bassline and self-deprecating and abstract lyrics.

== Album concept ==
The album title contains Ringo Sheena’s message: “As long as one tries to live earnestly as a human being, there will surely be moratorium moments when one cannot fit into society. For my own sake as well, I want to say, ‘That is not guilty.’” The abbreviated form of the title is “MM,” taken from the first characters of Muzai (“Not Guilty”) and Moratorium.

As for her creative intent, Sheena did not aim primarily to express the worldview of the lyrics. Instead, she conceived the album as a kind of musical calling card—something that, if heard by fellow musicians, would immediately convey, “This is the kind of artist she is.” Because it was the first time she was presenting her own style, she deliberately emphasized certain aspects to make them easier to grasp. And whenever discrepancies arose between the demos she had created alone and the finished versions, she paid close attention to correcting them, ensuring that the music would not be misunderstood.

=== Artwork ===
The album jacket design was handled by art director Yutaka Kimura. Wanting the jacket photo to be taken in a place where she would appear completely out of place, Sheena suggested the idea: “Wouldn’t it be interesting if I were standing alone among a group of people at a courthouse, where lawyers are holding up banners with words like ‘Not Guilty’ or ‘Victory’ written on them?” Kimura approved the idea, and extras such as newspaper reporters, press photographers, and security guards were gathered for the shoot. The calligraphy on the banner was done by Sheena herself.

== Promotion ==
=== Singles and other songs ===
"Kōfukuron" was released as the album's lead single on May 27, 1998, as a 8cm mini CD single. It was later rereleased as a 12cm standard CD on October 27, 1999. In terms of single sales, the 8cm disc did not make it onto the Oricon sales chart in Japan at the time. The 1999 rerelease peaked at number ten on the Oricon Singles Chart and also peaked at number ten on Japan's TBS Count Down TV Chart. The single was certified gold by the Recording Industry Association of Japan (RIAJ) for 200,000 copies shipped to stores.

"Kabukichō no Joō" was released as the album's second single on September 9, 1998. The song was used as the theme song for the NHK music show Pop Jam in 1998 and in a Suntory commercial for The Cocktail Bar Mimosa. This single reached number 50 on the Oricon Singles Chart and sold 50,540 units in Japan. The single also only peaked at a modest number 61 on the Count Down TV Chart. It was certified gold for 100,000 downloads to cellphones by the RIAJ in 2011.

"Koko de Kiss Shite." was released as the album's third and final single on January 20, 1999. It was the theme song for Koko de Kiss Shite, a drama produced for NTV's Shin-D series of dramas from March 2 to April 27, 1999. The song was also used as a theme song for the variety show Downtown DX. The single debuted and peaked at number 10 on both the Oricon Singles Chart and on the Count Down TV Chart. It was certified gold twice by the RIAJ: Once in 1999 for 200,000 physical copies shipped, and once in 2011 for 100,000 paid downloads to cellphones.

=== Live appearances and tours ===
After releasing her debut album Muzai Moratorium in February 1999, she toured the album on her six-date Senkō Ecstasy tour in April 1999, with her band Gyakutai Glykogen. Later that year she embarked on the Manabiya Ecstasy tour in November 1999. The tour traversed university campuses: Tokai University's Shonan Capus in Hiratsuka, Kanagawa, Showa Women's University in Tokyo, Seinan Gakuin University in Fukuoka and Ritsumeikan University in Kyoto.

== Reception ==
Professional ratings
Review scores
Source	Rating
Sputnikmusic	4/5 stars
CDJournal	(positive)

Muzai Moratorium was lauded by music critics. The album received a positive review from MS2k for the American online publication Sputnikmusic. The reviewer described the album as “excellent,” noting that even skeptics of J-pop would find Sheena’s debut compelling due to its musical depth and emotional resonance.

A staff member from CDJournal gave the album a glowing review, commenting: “An absolutely astonishing debut. Her stoic yet emotionally dampened voice leaves a fierce mark on the listener’s emotional core. Every track has the popularity and polish to be released as a single, yet the anarchic chill evoked by her lyrics intertwines perfectly with that accessibility. A true masterpiece.” Yuichi Hirayama lauded Sheena’s debut album as a bold and unbalanced masterpiece, stating: “This artist doesn’t care about balance at all. Delicacy and vulgarity are tangled together chaotically.” He described how Sheena’s inner reality intrudes upon the external world, and in trying to see more clearly, paradoxically makes reality itself more vivid.

The album was named number 3 on Bounce's 2009 list of 54 Standard Japanese Rock Albums.

Commercially, Muzai Moratorium was quite successful. The album debuted at number two on the Oricon Albums Chart, selling 227,120 copies in its first week. It stayed at the number two position on its second week, logging sales of 113,700 copies. The album charted for a total of 86 weeks in the top 300. At the end of 1999, Muzai Moratorium was ranked as the 25th best-selling album of the year with 918,950 copies sold. It also ranked as the 42nd best-selling album of 2000 with 513,190 copies sold in that year. The album was certified triple platinum by the Recording Industry Association of Japan (RIAJ) for 1,200,000 copies shipped. The album has sold a total of 1,433,052 units in Japan overall and is her second best-selling album behind Shōso Strip (2000).

== Track listing ==
All tracks are written by Ringo Sheena and arranged by Seiji Kameda

No.	Title	Length
1.	"Correct City" (正しい街 Tadashii Machi)	3:53
2.	"Queen of Kabuki-cho" (歌舞伎町の女王 Kabukichō no Joō)	2:53
3.	"Marunouchi Sadistic" (丸の内サディスティック Marunouchi Sadisutikku)	3:56
4.	"A View of Happiness (Joy Ver.)" (幸福論 (悦楽編) Kōfukuron (Etsuraku-hen))	2:58
5.	"When It Begins to Get Dark..." (茜さす 帰路照らされど・・・ Akane Sasu, Kiro Terasaredo...)	4:07
6.	"Sid & Daydreams" (シドと白昼夢 Sido to Hakuchūmu)	4:03
7.	"Playing with Blocks" (積木遊び Tsumiki Asobi)	3:24
8.	"Kiss Me" (ここでキスして。 Koko de Kisu Shite.)	4:20
9.	"Ordinary Night" (同じ夜 Onaji Yoru)	3:38
10.	"Caution" (警告 Keikoku)	4:05
11.	"Morphine" (モルヒネ Moruhine)	3:42

== Credits and personnel ==
Sheena used different bands throughout the album. She was also joined by guests Neko Saito (who continues working with her) and Chieko Kinbara (who works with Björk).

Zetsurin Hectopascal (絶倫ヘクトパスカル, Matchless Hectopascal) (#1,2,4,6,8,10)

- Ringo Sheena - vocals, drums (#2), handclap, whistle
- Susumu Nishikawa - electric guitar, acoustic guitar
- Seiji Kameda - bass guitar, handclap
- Noriyasu Kawamura - drums, backing vocal, handclap

Zekkyō Solfeggio (絶叫ソルフェージュ, Scream Solfeggio) (#3)

- Ringo Sheena - vocals, acoustic piano, melodica, handclap, footsteps
- Seiji Kameda - bass guitar, backing vocal
- Noriyasu Kawamura - drums, backing vocal, handclap, footsteps

Momoiro Spanner (桃色スパナ, Pink Spanner) (#5,7,9,11)

- Ringo Sheena - vocal, fake koto (synthesizer), whistle
- Akihito Suzuki - electric guitar, acoustic guitar, backing vocal guidance
- Seiji Kameda - bass guitar
- Noriyasu Kawamura - drums, conga

Guest players

- Toshiyuki Mori - electronic organ (#1,10), acoustic piano (#5)
- Neko Saito - acoustic violin (#9)
- Chieko Kinbara Strings - string section (#1,5)
- Tsunehiko Yashiro - electric organ (#8)

== Charts ==
=== Weekly charts ===
Chart (1999–2000)	Peak position
Japanese Albums (Oricon)	2

=== Year-end charts ===
1999 year-end charts for Muzai Moratorium
Chart (1999)	Position
Japanese Albums (Oricon)	25

2000 year-end charts for Muzai Moratorium
Chart (2000)	Position
Japanese Albums (Oricon)	42

=== Decade-end charts ===
Chart (1990–1999)	Position
Japanese Albums (Oricon)	98

=== All-time chart ===
Chart	Position
Japanese Albums (Oricon)	143

== Certifications and sales ==
Region	Certification	Certified units/sales
Japan (RIAJ)	3× Platinum	1,433,052
