= Kōfukuron =

- 8cm 1998 edition cover.

Single by Ringo Sheena

from the album Muzai Moratorium
- Released: May 27, 1998 (8cm Single); October 27, 1999 (12cm Single)
- Recorded: Studio Terra
- Genre: pop
- Length: 7:38 (8cm); 12:52 (12cm)
- Label: Toshiba EMI, East World
- Songwriter: Ringo Sheena
- Producers: Hiroshi Kitashiro (M1, 2); Uni Inoue (M3)

Ringo Sheena singles chronology
"Kōfukuron" (1998)	"Kabukichō no Joō" (1998)

Alternative cover
- 12cm 1999 edition cover.

"Kōfukuron" (幸福論, lit.The theory of happiness) is the debut single by Japanese singer Ringo Sheena and it was released on May 27, 1998 by Toshiba EMI, East World. Since Sheena suddenly gained popularity, it was decided that this single was resold as a 12 cm single. New edition, including the new song, was re-released with the fourth single "Honnō" on October 27, 1999. The 1999 edition was certified gold by the RIAJ for 200,000 copies shipped to stores.

== Background ==
"Kōfukuron" and "Suberidai" were produced by Hiroshi Kitashiro, who is an audio engineer and synthesizer programmer, and "Toki ga Bōsō Suru" was produced by Uni Inoue, who is an audio engineer and multi-instrumentalist. Seiji Kameda arranged all songs. Sheena wanted to release not "Kōfukuron" but B-side song "Suberidai" as a title tune. However, she gave up on the idea because of opposition from EMI staff.

Since Sheena was not pleased with the arrangement of "Kōfukuron," the single version was not included in the album. The song was used as the theme song to the TBS variety show Ai no Hinadan, and the "Etsuraku-hen" version featured on Muzai Moratorium, in a 1999 commercial for Suntory's The Cocktail Bar Cassis & Orange.

The song was covered as a part of a medley by Rie Tomosaka on the television show The Yoru mo Hippare on September 9, 2000. It was later covered by Arashi members Jun Matsumoto and Masaki Aiba on their 2002 concert Arashi Storm Concert Tour 2003 "Atarashi Arashi".

== Track listing ==
All tracks are written by Ringo Sheena, arranged by Seiji Kameda.

First Press Edition (8cm Single)
No.	Title	Length
1.	"Kōfukuron (幸福論, A View of Happiness)"	3:45
2.	"Suberidai (すべりだい, Slide)"	4:00

All tracks are written by Ringo Sheena.

Resale edition (12cm Single)
No.	Title	Arranger(s)	Length
1.	"Kōfukuron (幸福論, A View of Happiness)"	Seiji Kameda	3:37
2.	"Suberidai (すべりだい, Slide)"	Seiji Kameda	4:01
3.	"Toki ga Bōsō Suru (時が暴走する, Time Drives Recklessly)"	Seiji Kameda, Ringo Sheena	5:11

== Charts and sales ==
Chart (1999)	Peak position
Japan Oricon weekly singles	5
Chart (2011)	Peak position
Japan RIAJ Digital Track Chart	92

=== Sales and certifications ===
Chart	Amount
Oricon physical sales	261,000
RIAJ physical certification	Gold (200,000)

== Credits and personnel ==
Kōfukuron

- Synthesizer Programming: Hiroshi Kitashiro
- Zetsurin Hectopascal (絶倫ヘクトパスカル, Matchless Hectopascal)
  - Vocals: Ringo Sheena
  - Electric guitar: Susumu Nishikawa
  - Electric Bass: Seiji Kameda
  - Drums: Noriyasu "Kāsuke" Kawamura

Suberidai

- Vocals: Ringo Sheena
- Electric guitar, Acoustic Guitar: Susumu Nishikawa
- Contrabass: Hitoshi Watanabe
- Synthesizer Programming: Hiroshi Kitashiro

Toki ga Bōsō Suru

- Vocals, piano: Ringo Sheena
- Drums: Masayuki Muraishi
- Synthesizer Programming: Nobuhiko Nakayama
