= Koko de Kiss Shite =

"Koko de Kiss Shite."

Single by Ringo Sheena

from the album Muzai Moratorium
- Released: February 20, 1999
- Length: 12:12
- Label: Toshiba EMI, East World
- Songwriter: Ringo Sheena
- Producer: Hiroshi Kitashiro

Ringo Sheena singles chronology
| "Kabukichō no Joō" (1998) | "Koko de Kiss Shite." (1999) | "Honnō" (1999) |

"Koko de Kiss Shite." (ここでキスして。, lit.Kiss Me Here.) is Japanese singer Ringo Sheena's 3rd single and it was released on January 20, 1999, by Toshiba EMI, East World. It was certified gold twice by the RIAJ: Once in 1999 for 200,000 physical copies shipped, and once in 2011 for 100,000 paid downloads to cellphones.

== Background ==
There are two music videos of Koko de Kiss Shite., and the video which she and her band members performed in the rose garden was adopted officially. The literal translation of song titles is slightly different from the official English title.

It was the theme song for Koko de Kiss Shite, a drama produced for NTV's Shin-D series of dramas from March 2 to April 27, 1999. The song was also used as a theme song for the variety show Downtown DX. The song was covered as a part of a medley by Rie Tomosaka on the television show The Yoru mo Hippare on September 9, 2000. It was covered again by Tsuyoshi Domoto of KinKi Kids on their Fuji TV variety show Shin-Domoto Kyodai on July 3, 2005, and by D.H.Y (Dogs Holiday of Yawn) on their cover album Loves (2006).

== Track listing ==
All tracks are written by Ringo Sheena, arranged by Seiji Kameda.

CD
| No. | Title | Length |
|---|---|---|
| 1. | "Koko de Kiss Shite. (ここでキスして。, Kiss Me.)" (from Muzai Moratorium) | 4:19 |
| 2. | "Memai (眩暈, Vertigo)" | 4:41 |
| 3. | "Remote Controller (リモートコントローラー, Remote Control)" | 3:15 |
| Total length: | | 12:15 |

== Charts and sales ==
| Chart (1999) | Peak position |
|---|---|
| Japan Oricon weekly singles | 10 |
| Chart (2009) | Peak position |
| Japan Billboard Japan Hot 100 | 5 |
| Chart (2011) | Peak position |
| Japan RIAJ Digital Track Chart | 28 |
| Japan RIAJ Digital Track Chart: Expo 08 Live Version | 80 |

=== Sales and certifications ===
| Chart | Amount |
|---|---|
| Oricon physical sales | 309,000 |
| RIAJ physical certification | Gold (200,000) |
| RIAJ cellphone download certification | Gold (100,000) |
| RIAJ streaming certification | Gold (50,000,000) |

== Credits and personnel ==
Koko de Kiss Shite.

- Zetsurin Hectopascal (絶倫ヘクトパスカル, Matchless Hectopascal)
  - Vocals: Ringo Sheena
  - Guitars: Susumu Nishikawa
  - Bass guitars: Seiji Kameda
  - Drums: Noriyasu "Kāsuke" Kawamura
- Synthesizer Operator: Hiroshi Kitashiro
- Guest Player
  - Electronic Organ: Tsunehiko Yashiro

Memai

- Vocals, Piano: Ringo Sheena
- Guitars: Susumu Nishikawa
- Bass guitars: Seiji Kameda
- Synthesizer Operator: Hiroshi Kitashiro

Remote Controller

- Vocals, Harpsichord: Ringo Sheena
- Guitars: Susumu Nishikawa
- Bass guitars: Seiji Kameda
- Drums: Noriyasu "Kāsuke" Kawamura
- Synthesizer Operator: Hiroshi Kitashiro

== Music video cast ==
Koko de Kiss Shite.

- Vocal & Rhythm guitar: Ringo Sheena
- Lead guitar: Akihito Suzuki (from Heart Bazaar)
- Bass guitar: Masatoshi Asauchi (from Farmstay, Kera & The Synthesizers)
- Drums: Hisashi Nishikawa (A friend of Sheena)
