= Tsumi to Batsu =

Single by Ringo Sheena

from the album Shōso Strip
- Released: January 26, 2000
- Genre: Alternative rock, pop, pop rock
- Length: 13:49
- Label: Toshiba EMI / Virgin Music
- Songwriter: Ringo Sheena
- Producer: Uni Inoue

Ringo Sheena singles chronology
"Honnō" (1999)	"Tsumi to Batsu" (2000)	"Mayonaka wa Junketsu" (2001)

"Tsumi to Batsu" (罪と罰, Crime and Punishment) is Japanese singer Ringo Sheena's 6th single and it was released on January 26, 2000, by Toshiba EMI / Virgin Music. It was certified double platinum by the RIAJ for 545,730 copies shipped to stores.

== Background ==
"Tsumi to Batsu" is taken from Sheena's second album Shōso Strip. When she sang this song on her first national tour Senkō Ecstasy, she joked with her fans, "If you want to buy this song as a single, please send a letter to Toshiba-EMI". Then, the letters actually poured in to Toshiba EMI, and it was decided to release this song. Ken-ichi Asai, ex-Blankey Jet City, plays the guitar on "Tsumi to Batsu."

== Track listing ==
CD
No.	Title	Writer(s)	Arranger(s)	Length
1.	"Tsumi to Batsu" (罪と罰, "Crime and Punishment")	Ringo Sheena	Seiji Kameda & Ringo Sheena	4:43
2.	"Kimi no Hitomi ni Koishiteru" (君ノ瞳ニ恋シテル "Your Eyes Make Me Fall in Love", "Can't Take My Eyes off of You" cover)	Bob Crewe, Bob Gaudio	Seiji Kameda & Ringo Sheena	4:31
3.	"17 (Seventeen)"	Ringo Sheena	Seiji Kameda & Ringo Sheena	4:33
Total length:				13:49

== Cover versions ==
- Takashi Obara on his piano cover album Try Try Try "Piano yo Utae" Special (2004)
- General Head Mountain on their third album Tsuki Kanashi Blue (2008).
- It was covered again by Blistar on Blistar Rockin' Covers: Rock & Sexy (2011).
- In 2018 Japanese-American singer Ai covered "Tsumi to Batsu". The song, titled as "Crime and Punishment", was included on the album Fruit Défendu, a tribute album featuring a variety of Ringo Sheena's songs covered by multiple artists.
- In 2022, Japanese singer Ado released a cover of "Tsumi to Batsu" on YouTube. Her cover of the song, titled as "Crime and Punishment", was included on her 2023 cover album, Ado's Utattemita Album.

== Credits and personnel ==
Tsumi to Batsu

- Vocals: Shiina Ringo
- Electric guitars and Tooth Flute: Ken-ichi Asai "Benzie" (from Blankey Jet City)
- Bass guitars: Seiji Kameda
- Drums: Masayuki Muraishi
- Organ: Yuta Saito

Kimi no Hitomi ni Koishiteru

- Gyakutai Glycogen (虐待グリコゲン, Abuse Glycogen)
  - Vocals: Shiina Ringo
  - Electric guitars: Susumu Nishikawa
  - Electric Bass, Handclap: Seiji Kameda
  - Drums: Masayuki Muraishi
  - Synthesizer: Makoto Minagawa

17

- Vocals: Shiina Ringo
- Electric guitars: Susumu Nishikawa
- Bass guitars: Seiji Kameda
- Drums and Tambourines: Noriyasu "Kāsuke" Kawamura
- Piano: Yuta Saito
- Synthesizer programming: Nobuhiko Nakayama
- The Strings: Chieko Kinbara Group
