= Shōso Strip =

Shōso Strip 勝訴ストリップ

Studio album by Ringo Sheena
- Released: March 31, 2000
- Studios: Studio Terra; Kame-chan Studio
- Genres: Alternative rock; noise pop; art pop; pop rock
- Length: 55:55
- Label: Toshiba EMI
- Producer: Uni Inoue

Ringo Sheena chronology
Muzai Moratorium (1999)	Shōso Strip 勝訴ストリップ (2000)	Ze-Chyou Syuu (2000)

Singles from Shōso Strip
- 1. "Honnō" Released: October 27, 1999; 2. "Gips" Released: January 26, 2000; 3. "Tsumi to Batsu" Released: January 26, 2000

Shōso Strip (勝訴ストリップ), also known as Winning Strip, is the second studio album by Japanese singer and songwriter Ringo Sheena, released on March 31, 2000, by Toshiba EMI and Virgin Music. The limited-edition version includes a special booklet and case. The album debuted at #1 and has sold over 2,332,000 copies.

== Background and production ==
On February 24, 1999, Sheena released her debut studio album, Muzai Moratorium. It was a commercial success in Japan, selling more than 1.4 million units. Production on Shōso Strip began in the summer of 1999, and all recording was completed by the end of that season. Initially, the plan was to focus on older songs, effectively making the album an extension of—or even a continuation of—Muzai Moratorium. However, the original tracklist was scrapped after Sheena decided to include new songs that she had previously been unable to record due to her busy schedule. Thanks to a supportive atmosphere where the staff prioritized her vision, Sheena was able to make key decisions herself—such as determining exactly which musicians were essential for specific tracks or deciding to play instruments herself—allowing her to create an album that was more honest and true to her own artistic ego than her previous work. While her previous album resembled a singles collection—featuring tracks with distinct identities that could stand alone—Shōso Strip was crafted with the intention of being experienced as a cohesive whole.

When Sheena was interviewed by the Japanese magazine Switch, she said that she would "end her solo singing career after releasing three more albums," which shocked the Japanese music scene. However, it was later proven, that she was going to meet everyone as the band Tokyo Jihen. Interestingly, in 2000, when Sheena was interviewed by the Japanese magazine Rockin' on Japan, she mentioned the boast she had made when she debuted: "Defeat the Komuro family!" This was because when she released Shōso Strip, she was very dissatisfied with the repetitive style of the Japanese music industry. At that time, in order to prove a point, she did the entire production process herself, from the album to the pressing of the disc. Now, recalling it, she said shyly: "When I was being interviewed, I even told those incompetent producers to eat shit. I feel really embarrassed now."

== Symmetry ==
Shōso Strip showcases Sheena's symmetrical style for the first time. She herself said, "When Asai played the guitar for me, I decided to put 'Tsumi to Batsu' in the middle of the album and that there would be 13 songs in the whole album. As for the order of the tracks, if there were no "Identity," "Stoicism" would also disappear. There is this kind of unnecessary rigidity, and some songs even become pitiful as a result. In addition, Sheena also said that the total recording time is '55 minutes and 55 seconds,' which was decided before the recording started. Sheena also said that this is longer than the first album (41 minutes and 1 second). In addition, Sheena also explained that when Seiji Kameda first participated in the recording, he thought she was joking, but she still insisted on it. In order to maintain '55 minutes and 55 seconds,' she even cut off the ending of the last song "Izon-shō," which made it a bit unnatural. But in order to maintain order on one side, she did not hesitate to disrupt the order on the other side. And in her later works (including those from the Tokyo Jihen period), a sense of symmetry appears.

The song titles are centered around the seventh song, "Tsumi to Batsu," and are symmetrical in terms of the number of characters, hiragana, and katakana, with the duration being exactly "fifty-five minutes and fifty-five seconds."

勝訴ストリップ
01.虚言症	13.依存症
02.浴室	12.本能
03.弁解ドビュッシー	11.病床パブリック
04.ギブス	10.サカナ
05.闇に降る雨	09.月に負け犬
06.アイデンティティ	08.ストイシズム
07.罪と罰
Total running time: 55 minutes 55 seconds

== Composition and content ==
The first track “Kyogen-sho” is a powerful hard-rock opener with soaring vocals, distorted bass, and chilling jazz-fusion-influenced guitar chords. "Yokushitsu" is a dark art-pop/dance track built on a repeating bassline and mechanical drum programming. "Benkai Debussy" is a fast avant-pop song characterized by distorted vocals, sharp tempo shifts, and playful piano stabs. "Gips" is a grand melodic rock ballad transitioning from tender acoustic guitar to a soaring chorus. "Yami ni Furu Ame" is a menacing alternative rock featuring an aggressive violin intro clashing with heavy guitar riffs. "Identity" is a fast-paced grunge-pop employing energetic 90s-style distorted guitar chords. "Tsumi to Batsu" Psychedelic hard rock driven by warbling organs, heavy bass, and dramatic vocals.

"Stoicism" is an experimental, punchy instrumental interlude focused on rhythmic percussion. "Tsuki Ni Makeinu" is a mid-tempo alternative rock track utilizing a standard band setup and clean guitar work. "Sakana" is a eccentric pop-rock featuring quirky time signatures and an unnatural fade-out matching the album's runtime design. "Byoushou Public" is an upbeat punk-infused pop song with raw guitar chords and direct percussion. "Honnō" is a sleek alternative pop-rock driven by a pulsing rhythm, rhythmic piano, and theatrical vocals. "Izon-shō" is an epic closing power ballad featuring lush instrumentation and intense vocal crescendos.

== Reception ==
Professional ratings
Review scores
Source	Rating
Sputnikmusic	5/5 stars

Upon its release, Shōso Strip received highly favorable reviews from music critics. Sputnikmusic gave Shōso Strip a perfect 5/5, describing it as an almost “transcendental” listening experience. The reviewer praised Sheena’s eclectic blend of rock, jazz, classical, punk, hip-hop, and orchestral elements, but especially highlights how dynamically and atmospherically those styles are combined. In his review for SRCZ Magazine, Seba Gahan praised Shōso Strip as a loud, daring, and inventive album, highlighting its energetic rock sound, dramatic vocals, and memorable tracks such as “Yami ni Furu Ame” and “Youkushitsu.” He considered it a “production tour de force,” while noting that its overwhelming volume and intensity may not suit every occasion.

In September 2007, Rolling Stone Japan rated the album at number 89 on its list of the "100 Greatest Japanese Rock Albums of All Time". Shōso Strip won the Rock Album of the Year award at the 15th Japan Gold Disc Awards in 2001 as well as the Best Album award at the 42nd Japan Record Awards.

It was certified two million copies by the RIAJ.

== Track listing ==
All tracks are written by Ringo Sheena; all tracks arranged by Seiji Kameda and Ringo Sheena.

No.	Title	Length
1.	"I Am a Liar" (虚言症 Kyogen-shō)	5:26
2.	"Bathroom" (浴室 Yokushitsu)	4:15
3.	"Excuse Debussy" (弁解ドビュッシー Benkai Dobyusshii)	3:16
4.	"Gips" (ギブス Gibusu)	5:38
5.	"A Driving Rain in Darkness" (闇に降る雨 Yami ni Furu Ame)	5:03
6.	"Identity" (アイデンティティ Aidentiti)	3:05
7.	"Crime and Punishment" (罪と罰 Tsumi to Batsu)	5:32
8.	"Stoicism" (ストイシズム Sutoishizumu)	1:46
9.	"A Broken Man and Moonlight" (月に負け犬 Tsuki ni Makeinu)	4:14
10.	"Tidbits" (サカナ Sakana)	3:43
11.	"Sickbed Public" (病床パブリック Byōshō Public)	3:16
12.	"Instinct" (本能 Honnō)	4:14
13.	"I Am an Addict" (依存症 Izon-shō)	6:23
Total length:		55:55

== Personnel ==
"Kyogen-shō"

- Ringo Sheena – vocals
- Yukio Nagoshi – electric guitars, acoustic guitars
- Seiji Kameda – bass guitars
- Noriyasu Kawamura – drums
- Koichi Asakura, Asa-Chang (from Asa-Chang & Junray, ex-Tokyo Ska Paradise Orchestra) – drums, percussion
- Nobuhiko Nakayama – programming
- Toshiyuki Mori – electric piano
- Chieko Kinbara Strings – string section

"Yokushitsu"

- Ringo Sheena – vocals, piano
- Susumu Nishikawa – electric guitars
- Seiji Kameda – bass guitars
- Nobuhiko Nakayama – programming
- Yuta Saito – synthesizer, harps

"Benkai Debussy"

- Ringo Sheena – vocals
- Seiji Kameda – bass guitars
- Masayuki Muraishi – drums
- Nobuhiko Nakayama – programming
- Makoto Totani (from Thinners) – guitars (uwamono)
- Makoto Minagawa (from Thinners) – synthesizer, chorus (uwamono)

"Gibs"

- Ringo Sheena – vocals
- Susumu Nishikawa – electric guitars
- Seiji Kameda – bass guitars
- Noriyasu Kawamura – drums, tambourines
- Nobuhiko Nakayama & Hiroshi Kitashiro – programming

"Yami ni furu ame"

- Ringo Sheena – vocals
- Susumu Nishikawa – electric guitars
- Seiji Kameda – bass guitars
- Noriyasu Kawamura – drums, tambourines
- Nobuhiko Nakayama – programming
- Ittetsu Gen Strings – string section

"Identity"

- Ringo Sheena – vocals, electric guitars
- Susumu Nishikawa – electric guitars
- Seiji Kameda – bass guitars
- Masayuki Muraishi – drums
- Makoto Minagawa – tambourines
- moOog yamamOTO (from Buffalo Daughter) – turntables

"Tsumi to Batsu"

- Ringo Sheena – vocals
- Kenichi Asai, Benzie (from Blankey Jet City) – electric guitars, tooth flute
- Seiji Kameda – bass guitars
- Masayuki Muraishi – drums
- Yuta Saito – organ

"Stoicism"

- Ringo Sheena – vocals, electric guitars
- Rino Tokitsu – the sample of voice
- Nobuhiko Nakayama – programming
- Susumu Nishikawa – electric guitars

"Tsuki ni Makeinu"

- Ringo Sheena – vocals
- Yukio Nagoshi – electric guitars, acoustic guitars
- Seiji Kameda – bass guitars
- Koichi Asakura, Asa-Chang (from Asa-Chang & Junray) – drums

"Sakana"

- Ringo Sheena – vocals
- Susumu Nishikawa – electric guitars
- Seiji Kameda – bass guitars
- Noriyasu Kawamura – drums, tambourines
- Nobuhiko Nakayama – programming
- Yuta Saito – electric piano
- Yokan Mizue – trumpet

"Byoushou Public"

- Ringo Sheena – vocals, electric guitars
- Susumu Nishikawa – electric guitars
- Seiji Kameda – bass guitars
- Masayuki Muraishi – drums
- Toshiyuki Mori – organ

"Honnou"

- Ringo Sheena – vocals
- Yukio Nagoshi – electric guitars, acoustic guitars
- Seiji Kameda – bass guitars
- Yuta Saito – piano
- Masayuki Muraishi – drums
- Nobuhiko Nakayama – programming

"Izon-shō"

- Ringo Sheena – vocals
- Susumu Nishikawa – electric guitars
- Seiji Kameda – bass guitars
- Noriyasu Kawamura – drums, tambourines
- Toshiyuki Mori – piano
- moOog yamamOTO (from Buffalo Daughter) – turntables
- Nobuhiko Nakayama – programming
