= Kabukichō no Joō =

Single by Ringo Sheena

from the album Muzai Moratorium
- Released: September 9, 1998
- Length: 8:57
- Label: Toshiba EMI / EAST WORLD
- Songwriter(s): Ringo Sheena, Cyndi Lauper, Tom Kelly, Billy Steinberg
- Producer(s): Hiroshi Kitashiro

Ringo Sheena singles chronology
"Kōfukuron" (1998)	"Kabukichō no Joō" (1998)	"Koko de Kiss Shite." (1999)

"Kabukichō no Joō" (歌舞伎町の女王, Queen of Kabukicho) is Japanese singer Ringo Sheena's 2nd single and it was released on September 9, 1998 by Toshiba EMI, East World. It was certified gold for 100,000 downloads to cellphones by the RIAJ in 2011.

== Background ==
M1 is the song which Ringo Sheena wrote imagining Kabuki-cho before she actually visited there. M2 is a cover of Cyndi Lauper's song. However, she referred to Susanna Hoffs version. The Japanese translation appeared in the liner notes is the lyrics which Sheena translated freely. M3 is the songs in which she recorded "Kabukichō no Joō" and "Marunouchi Sadistic" in the style of singing to her own guitar accompaniment. She actually sang in outdoor at first. Since it didn’t sound like reality, she re-recorded it in studio and added sound effects, such as footsteps and noises of bustle.

The song was used as the theme song for the NHK music show Pop Jam in 1998 and in a Suntory commercial for The Cocktail Bar Mimosa. The song was covered as a part of a medley by Rie Tomosaka on the television show The Yoru mo Hippare on September 9, 2000. It was covered again by Yoshihiro Kai on his album 10 Stories (2007), in English by Allister member Scott Murphy from his album Guilty Pleasures 3 (2008), on Fragrance's album Colorful (2009) and by the Gypsy Vagabonz on G-Jazz Swing Cover (2011).

== Track listing ==
All tracks are written by Ringo Sheena, unless otherwise noted

CD
No.	Title	Writer(s)	Arranger(s)	Length
1.	"Kabukichō no Joō"		Seiji Kameda	2:51
2.	"Unconditional Love" (Cyndi Lauper cover, partial Susanna Hoffs cover.)	Cyndi Lauper, Tom Kelly, Billy Steinberg	Seiji Kameda	3:46
3.	"Jitsuroku -Shinjuku nite- Marunouchi Sadistic~Kabukichō no Joō (実録 －新宿にて－ 丸の内サディスティック～歌舞伎町の女王, An Actual Shinjuku Recording of Marunouchi Sadistic & Queen of Kabuki-cho)"			2:16

== Charts and sales ==
Chart (1998)	Peak position
Japan Oricon weekly singles	50
Chart (2011)	Peak position
Japan RIAJ Digital Track Chart	61

=== Sales and certifications ===
Chart	Amount
Oricon physical sales	51,000
RIAJ cellphone download certification	Gold (100,000)

== Credits and personnel ==
Kabukichō no Joō

- Zetsurin Hectopascal (絶倫ヘクトパスカル, Matchless Hectopascal)
  - Vocals, drums, whistle: Ringo Sheena
  - Electric guitar, acoustic Guitar: Susumu Nishikawa
  - Electric Bass, handclap: Seiji Kameda

Unconditional Love

- Vocals: Ringo Sheena
- The strings: Chieko Kinbara Group
- Bell & loops: Seiji Kameda
- Synthesizer programming: Hiroshi Kitashiro
