= Honnō (song) =

Single by Ringo Sheena

from the album Shōso Strip
- Released: October 27, 1999
- Genre: alternative rock, pop, jazz
- Length: 12:12
- Label: Toshiba EMI / East World
- Songwriter: Ringo Sheena
- Producer: Uni Inoue

Ringo Sheena singles chronology
"Koko de Kiss Shite." (1998)	"Honnō" (1999)	"Gips" (2000)

"Honnō" (本能; "Instinct") is Japanese singer Ringo Sheena's 4th single and it was released on October 27, 1999, by Toshiba EMI / East World. The single was certified double platinum by the RIAJ for 800,000 copies shipped to stores, and later gold for 100,000 downloads to cellphones in 2011.

== Background ==
"Honnō" is taken from Sheena's second album Shōso Strip and is presently her best selling single. The music video and album art, which featured Sheena in a traditional nurse's dress and cap shattering a screen of glass, became a hot topic at its release. Sheena had originally planned to release "Gips" at this point. However, she reversed this decision, believing that the "freshness" of "Gips" had already faded as she had promoted the song on her previous Japanese tour. She substituted it with the earlier recorded "Honnō", to much success.

The song was used as a theme song for the music TV show Fun (Fun's Recommend #007). The song was covered as a part of a medley by Rie Tomosaka on the television show The Yoru mo Hippare on September 9, 2000. Satoko Nishikawa of Shang Shang Typhoon covered it on her solo album Hibiki in 2006, and by Dorlis on her greatest hits album Dorlis (2012).

The B-sides "Aozora" and "Rinne Highlight" were used in TV commercials for Suntory's The Cocktail Bar Love Story, "Rinne Headlight" in 1999 and "Aozora" in 2000.

== Track listing ==
All tracks are written by Ringo Sheena, arranged by Seiji Kameda & Ringo Sheena.

CD
No.	Title	Length
1.	"Honnō (本能, Instinct)"	4:16
2.	"Aozora (あおぞら, Blue Sky)"	4:19
3.	"Rin-ne Highlight (輪廻ハイライト, Transmigration Highlights)"	3:28
Total length:		12:12

== Chart rankings ==
Chart (1999)	Peak position
Japan Oricon weekly singles	2
Chart (2011)	Peak position
Japan RIAJ Digital Track Chart	35

=== Sales and certifications ===
Chart	Amount
Oricon physical sales	998,000
RIAJ physical certification	2× Platinum (800,000)
RIAJ cellphone download certification	Gold (100,000)
RIAJ streaming certification	Gold (50,000,000)

== Credits and personnel ==
Honnō

- Vocals: Ringo Sheena
- Guitars: Yukio Nagoshi
- Bass guitars: Seiji Kameda
- Piano: Yuta Saito
- Drums: Masayuki Muraishi
- Synthesizer Programming: Nobuhiko Nakayama

Aozora

- Vocals, Whistle: Ringo Sheena
- Guitars: Susumu Nishikawa
- Bass guitars: Seiji Kameda
- Organ: Yuta Saito
- Synthesizer: Makoto Minagawa
- Fluegelhorn: Yokan Mizue
- Drums, percussion, Toys: Koichi Asakura "Asa-Chang" (from Asa-Chang & Junray, ex-Tokyo Ska Paradise Orchestra)
- Synthesizer Operator: Nobuhiko Nakayama

Rin-ne Highlight

- Piano: Ken Shima
- Contrabass: Kenji Takamizu
- Drums: Yuichi Tokashiki

== Music video cast ==
Honnō

- Vocal & Nurse: Ringo Sheena
- Electric bass guitar & Doctor: Yasunobu Torii (from Panicsmile, Gaji)
- Others: Kunihiro Suda (He is an actor. Sheena and he were in the same class in high school.)
