= Ryūkō (song) =

Song by Ringo Sheena

from the album Sanmon Gossip
- Released: June 24, 2009
- Recorded: 2009
- Genre: Pop, rock, hip hop
- Length: 4:16
- Label: EMI Music Japan
- Songwriter: Ringo Sheena Daisuke "Mummy-D" Sakama

"Ryūkō" (流行; "Vogue") is a song by Japanese musician Ringo Sheena, which acted as one of the promotional songs from her fourth album Sanmon Gossip in 2009. The song was produced by Sheena's former Tokyo Jihen bandmate Masayuki Hiizumi, and was a collaboration with Hiizumi's jazz ensemble Pe'z, as well as hip-hop group Maboroshi members Daisuke "Mummy-D" Sakama and Tomoyasu Takeuchi.

== Background and development ==
In 2007, Sheena resumed releasing music under her solo name, after working as a member of Tokyo Jihen since 2004. She released the soundtrack album Heisei Fūzoku in February, a project where she collaborated with composer Neko Saito to create music for the Mika Ninagawa-directed film Sakuran. In September of the same year, Tokyo Jihen released their third album, Variety, a project album featuring members other than vocalist Sheena composing the album's music. After their 2007 Spa & Treatment tour, this began a two-year period of inactivity for the band. In November 2008 to celebrate her 10th as a solo musician, Sheena held a series of three concerts at the Saitama Super Arena, Sheena Ringo (Nama) Ringo-han '80: Jūshūnen kin'en-sai.

Sheena began developing her fourth solo studio album in 2009. Sanmon Gossip was a collection of songs she did not think would work for her releases with Tokyo Jihen for stylistic reasons.

On May 27, Sheena released a single called "Ariamaru Tomi", which was used as the drama Smile's theme song. This song was commercially successful, being certified gold by the RIAJ in three different media.

Three months before the release of Sanmon Gossip, Sheena collaborated with Maboroshi on the song "Amai Yamai" from their third album Maboroshi no Shi.

== Writing and production ==
The song featured an arrangement produced by Masayuki Hiizumi a member of jazz ensemble Pe'z, and the former pianist for Tokyo Jihen from 2004 until 2005. Fellow Pe'z members Kou and Masahiro Nirehara also perform in the song. The two members of hip-hop group Maboroshi feature in the song: rapper Daisuke "Mummy-D" Sakama, and guitarist Tomoyasu Takeuchi.

Sheena wrote the song in order to explore the notion that industry leaders were typically male, noting that fashion industry leaders tended to be male while consumers female. Rapper Daisuke "Mummy-D" Sakama added his rap after Sheena had finished writing her sections. She requested that he write about fashion and sexuality.

== Promotion and release ==
On July 1, 2009, Sheena performed the song with Mummy-D during her second special on NHK's music program Songs.

== Music video ==
A music video for the song was first unveiled on July 6, 2009, directed by Yuichi Kodama. The video features Mummy-D and Sheena walking on a catwalk, surrounded by monitors that display their faces. The video was compiled on her music video collection Seiteki Healing: Sono Yon, which was released on DVD on August 26, 2009.

== Critical reception ==
CDJournal praised the song's "jazzy rock sound", and noted the sensuality in Sheena's voice.

== Personnel ==
Personnel details were sourced from Sanmon Gossip's liner notes booklet.

- H Zetto M – arrangement, wutlitzer, claps
- Kou – drums, claps
- Masahiro Nirehara – bass, claps
- Daisuke "Mummy-D" Sakama – rap, songwriting, claps
- Ringo Sheena – vocals, songwriting, claps
- Tomoyasu Takeuchi – guitar, claps

== Charts ==
Chart (2009)	Peak position
Japan Billboard Japan Hot 100	74

== Release history ==
Region	Date	Format	Distributing Label
Japan	June 24, 2009	Digital download	EMI Music Japan
