= Killer-tune =

Single by Tokyo Jihen

from the album Variety
- B-side: "BB.Queen"; "Karada"
- Released: August 1, 2007
- Recorded: 2007
- Genre: Pop-rock, swing music
- Length: 3:43
- Label: EMI Music Japan
- Songwriter: Ichiyo Izawa Ringo Sheena
- Producer: Tokyo Jihen

Tokyo Jihen singles chronology
"OSCA" (2007)	"Killer-tune" (2007)	"Senkō Shōjo" (2008)

"Killer-tune" (キラーチューン, Kirāchūn) is a song by Japanese rock band Tokyo Jihen, led by musician Ringo Sheena. It was released as the band's fifth single on August 22, 2007, as one of the two singles before the band's third album Variety (2007). The song was written by the band's pianist Ichiyo Izawa, with lyrics by Sheena.

== Background and development ==
Vocalist Ringo Sheena originally debuted as a solo musician in 1998, however decided to become a member of a band instead for her main musical activities, and debuted Tokyo Jihen in 2004. After their debut album Kyōiku, two of the original members of the band made decisions to leave, and were replaced by pianist Ichiyo Izawa and guitarist Ukigumo. The new line-up released the single "Shuraba", a song used as the theme song for the drama Ōoku: Hana no Ran., and the band's second album, Adult (2006). Adult, while featuring lyrics entirely written by Sheena and the band collaborating to arrange the songs, also featured "Himitsu", which was arranged solely by Izawa, and "Tegami", which was composed by Izawa and arranged by Sheena.

In late 2006 and 2007, Sheena briefly resumed solo activities in collaboration with Neko Saito, on Heisei Fūzoku (2007), a soundtrack album for the Mika Ninagawa film Sakuran. The "Killer-tune" single was first announced on June 7, 2007, a month before the physical release of "OSCA".

The Variety project for the band involved the band members other than Sheena amassing demo tapes, and the band making careful selections. For the project, Sheena worked as a vocalist and a lyricist. After the band's tour for Adult, Domestic! Just Can't Help It, finished on May 30, 2006, Sheena requested band members Ukigumo and Ichiyo Izawa write songs for the band's next studio album. While Sheena is the primary songwriter for her solo career and for Tokyo Jihen's first two albums, she occasionally goes through periods of not being able to write music.

== Writing and production ==
The song was originally given the demo title "Swing" (スウィング, Suingu) by Izawa, and while writing it intended to make the song sound like swing music. Much like "OSCA", Izawa did not consider the song in terms of becoming a single while writing it, however it later became one after the band voted on which two songs would become singles. Sheena wrote the song's lyrics after being inspired by the song's sound, also feeling inspired by the faces of fans at their live concerts.

The B-side "BB.Queen" was written sometime in 2003 or 2004, when Ukigumo first began recording music on his computer. The original song's tempo was much slower, and not as chaotic as the studio version. "Karada" was created with an image of "sweet soul music" in mind by Ukigumo, who was impressed by Sheena's abilities when recording soul and rhythm and blues music.

The single is stylistically similar to their next single "Killer-tune", released a month later. "OSCA" features an A-side written by Ukigumo and two Izawa compositions, while "Killer-tune" was written by Izawa and featured two Ukigumo compisitons as B-sides. In both cases, the final track is a song where Sheena collaborated with Robbie Clark to create a song with English lyrics. Neither release featured a cover song, unlike Tokyo Jihen's first three singles. The B-side "Karada" was given an entirely new title in English, "Physical".

== Promotion and release ==
The band appeared in magazines What's In, Dazed & Confused, Barfout!, Rockin' On Japan, Oricon Style and Smart to promote the release, as well as having special features on websites such as Biglobe, What's In? Web, Excite and Amazon.co.jp. On August 20, Tokyo Jihen appeared on the Tokyo FM radio program Yamada Hisashi no Radian Limited DX, and later performed the song on television programs Music Station on August 24 and Count Down TV on August 25. The song was performed during the band's Spa & Treatment (2007), Ultra C (2010) and Bon Voyage (2012) tours, with the band also performing the song during their festival/event performances at the Rising Sun Rock Festival (2008), Society of the Citizens Vol. 2 (2008), Countdown Japan (2009), EMI Rocks (2010) and the Terebi Asahi Dream Music Festival (2011). The B-side "BB.Queen" was only performed once by the band at Society of the Citizens Vol. 2, while "Karada" was performed as a part of the Spa & Treatment tour.

Soon after the release of the single, the band began promotions for the Variety album, which was released a month later on September 26, 2007.

== Music video ==
A music video was first unveiled on July 30, 2007, and was directed by Yuichi Kodama, who had previously collaborated with the band on the music video for "OSCA". It features Sheena walking forward in the rain, in the park area outside Saitama Super Arena. The other members of Tokyo Jihen perform the song around her. During the final instrumental section of the song, the rain stops, and six dancers in business attire dance the charleston.

At the 2008 Space Shower Music Video Awards, the video won the award for Best Technical Works Video, while director Yuichi Kodama won the best director award.

== Critical reception ==
Critical reception to the release was positive. Kiyohiko Koike for Listenmusic felt the song was an easy to listen to pop-rock song, with an oldies swing rhythm. He praised Sheena's vocals, in how they shift from comfortable to abruptly powerful. Reviewer Reiko Tsuzura called the song a "charming pop melody", and praised the lyrics as "sparkling". Reviewers from CDJournal described the song as having a "light swinging band sound" and being "jazzy and dynamic". They praised Sheena's "sensual dynamism", along with Tokyo Jihen's addictive pop sense.

For the B-sides, CDJournal described "BB.Queen" as "heavy psychedelic rock " that was "the height of hysteria while still being fine quality pop." They noted Sheena's vocal sense was surprising. In reviewing "Karada", they noted the song's "gentle sweet melody and jazz essence", believing it was illustrative of a "Tokyo Jihen-style album-oriented rock style" the band was developing.

== Track listing ==
No.	Title	Writer(s)	Length
1.	"Killer-tune"	Ichiyo Izawa, Ringo Sheena	3:43
2.	"BB.Queen"	Ukigumo	3:20
3.	"Karada" (体, "Body")	Ukigumo, R. Sheena, Robbie Clark	3:58
Total length:			11:01

== Personnel ==
Personnel details were sourced from "Killer-tune"'s liner notes booklet.

- Toshiki Hata – drums
- Daisuke Iga – styling
- Uni Inoue – recording, mixing
- Ichiyo Izawa – keyboards
- Seiji Kameda – bass
- Yutaka Kimura – advertisements, design
- Ringo Sheena – vocals
- Miyamoto Shigeo – mastering
- Takashi Saito – assistant engineer
- Shoji Uchida – photography
- Ukigumo – guitar

== Chart rankings ==
Charts (2007)	Peak position
Japan Oricon weekly singles	5
Japan Oricon monthly singles	15
Japan RIAJ monthly ringtones	77
Japan RIAJ yearly PC downloads	84

=== Sales ===
Chart	Amount
Oricon physical sales	51,000

== Release history ==
Region	Date	Format	Distributing Label	Catalogue codes
Japan	August 1, 2007	Ringtone, cellphone download	EMI Music Japan	
Japan	August 22, 2007	CD, PC download, rental CD	EMI Music Japan	TOCT-40125
South Korea	August 22, 2007	Digital download	EMI	
Taiwan	August 24, 2007	Gold Typhoon	CD	5099950569120
