= Saturday Night Gossip =

EP by Ringo Sheena
- Released: August 26, 2009
- Recorded: 2009
- Genre: Pop, rock, jazz, hip hop, orchestra
- Length: 23:56
- Language: Japanese, English
- Label: EMI Music Japan
- Producer: Ringo Sheena

Ringo Sheena chronology
| Sanmon Gossip (2009) | Saturday Night Gossip (2009) | Ukina (2013) |

Saturday Night Gossip (サタデーナイト・ゴシップ, Satadēnaito Goshippu) is a vinyl exclusive extended play by Japanese musician Ringo Sheena. It was released two months after her fourth studio album Sanmon Gossip, and features a collection of songs relating to that album.

== Background and development ==
Sheena's first three studio albums were released to vinyl. The first was Kalk Samen Kuri no Hana in 2003, three months after its initial studio release. Muzai Moratorium and Shōso Strip were released on vinyl in 2008, as a part of her 10-year anniversary celebrations. Instead of a full-length vinyl edition of Sanmon Gossip being released, Saturday Night Gossip was created. Similar extended plays were released for her band Tokyo Incidents' albums Adult (2006), called "ADULT VIDEO" Original Sound Track, and Variety (2007), called Variety Zōkangō.

== Writing and production ==
The album features four songs taken directly from Sanmon Gossip, including its bonus track "Marunouchi Sadistic (Expo Ver.)." One song is taken from the single "Ariamaru Tomi", "SG (Superficial Gossip)," and one song is a rearranged track from Sanmon Gossip, "clandestine (Saturday Night Gossip Ver.)." This version features an excerpt from the song "sharp practice" as its introduction before beginning.

The cover artwork is taken from the same photoshoot as Sheena's "Ariamaru Tomi" single and Sanmon Gossip album. It features a naked Sheena, covered with a Gibson SG guitar.

== Track listing ==
All music is composed by Ringo Sheena

Side A
| No. | Title | Lyrics | Arranger | Length |
|---|---|---|---|---|
| 1. | "Marunouchi Sadistic (Expo Ver.)" (丸の内サディスティック) | Ringo Sheena | Ukigumo | 2:52 |
| 2. | "SG ~Superficial Gossip~" | R. Sheena | Jazztronik | 4:16 |
| 3. | "clandestine (Saturday Night Gossip Ver.)" (密偵物語) | Jack Brown, Mummy D | Nobuhiko Nakayama, Mr. Drunk, Bakeneko Killer, Takayuki Hattori | 3:33 |

Side B
| No. | Title | Lyrics | Arranger | Length |
|---|---|---|---|---|
| 1. | "fake fellow" (マヤカシ優男) | R. Sheena | Soil & "Pimp" Sessions | 3:56 |
| 2. | "excitement" (色恋沙汰) | R. Sheena | Takayuki Hattori | 2:58 |
| 3. | "vogue" (流行) | R. Sheena, Mummy D | Masayuki Hiizumi & Ringo Sheena | 4:11 |
| Total length: | | | | 23:56 |

== Charts and sales ==
=== Charts ===
| Chart (2009) | Peak position |
|---|---|
| Japan Oricon weekly albums | 100 |

=== Sales and certifications ===
| Chart | Amount |
|---|---|
| Oricon physical sales | 1,400 |

== Release history ==
| Region | Date | Format | Distributing Label | Catalogue codes |
|---|---|---|---|---|
| Japan | August 26, 2009 | Vinyl record | EMI Music Japan | TOJT-26840 |
