= Shun (song) =

Song by Ringo Sheena

from the album Sanmon Gossip
- Released: June 1, 2009
- Recorded: 2009
- Genre: Pop, jazz
- Length: 4:47
- Label: EMI Music Japan
- Songwriter: Ringo Sheena

"Shun" (旬; "Season") (Japanese pronunciation: [shu͍n]) is a song by Japanese musician Ringo Sheena. It was the leading promotional song for her fourth album Sanmon Gossip. It was digitally released on June 1, 2009, a month before the release of the album and at the same time as Sheena's song "Futari Bocchi Jikan".

== Background and development ==
In 2007, Sheena resumed releasing music under her solo name, after working as a member of Tokyo Jihen since 2004. She released the soundtrack album Heisei Fūzoku in February, a project where she collaborated with composer Neko Saito to create music for the Mika Ninagawa-directed film Sakuran. In September of the same year, Tokyo Jihen released their third album, Variety, a project album featuring members other than vocalist Sheena composing the album's music. After their 2007 Spa & Treatment tour, this began a two-year period of inactivity for the band. In November 2008 to celebrate her 10th as a solo musician, Sheena held a series of three concerts at the Saitama Super Arena, Sheena Ringo (Nama) Ringo-han '80: Jūshūnen kin'en-sai.

Sheena began developing her fourth solo studio album in 2009. Sanmon Gossip was a collection of songs she did not think would work for her releases with Tokyo Jihen for stylistic reasons.

On May 27, Sheena released a single called "Ariamaru Tomi", which was used as the drama Smile's theme song. This song was commercially successful, being certified gold by the RIAJ in three different mediums.

== Writing and production ==
The song was produced by J.A.M: a musical sub-unit Soil & "Pimp" Sessions, composed of Jōsei on piano, Goldman Akita on wood bass and Midorin on drums. Sheena had worked with Soil & "Pimp" Sessions in several projects in the past, most notably the "Karisome Otome" single in 2006, as well as on "Mayakashi Yasaotoko", a song also featured on Sanmon Gossip.

== Promotion and release ==
On July 1, 2009, Sheena performed the song during her second special on NHK's music program Songs. Four years later, the song was performed during Sheena's Tōtaikai concerts in November 2013. Two recordings from these concerts were released of the song: the November 25 performance was featured on the Holiday Jazz on 25th November, 2013 live CD attached to the Tōtaikai video album, and the performance on November 26 was released on the DVD proper.

"Shun" was covered by R&B musician Daichi Miura on his tour Daichi Miura Live Tour 2010: Gravity on November 20, 2009.

== Music video ==
A music video was created for the song, and was first released on June 8, 2009. It was directed by Yutaka Kimura and cameraman Shoji Uchida, who were the creative team who worked on "nude visual" concept for the "Ariamaru Tomi" and Sanmon Gossip artworks. It features Sheena dressed in only a tan-coloured sheet, as images are projected into her skin.

The video was compiled on her music video collection Seiteki Healing: Sono Yon, which was released on DVD on August 26, 2009.

== Critical reception ==
CDJournal reviewers were positive about the song, calling it a "first rate love song". They noted the song as being a "soft ballad with a simple arrangement", and praised J.A.M's "jazzy arrangement" as being "pleasant".

== Personnel ==
Personnel details were sourced from Sanmon Gossip's liner notes booklet.

- Michiko Abe – violin
- Goldman Akita – wood bass
- Toshiki Akiyama – viola
- Kazuki Chiba – contrabass
- Great Eida – concert master
- Midori Eida – violin
- Motoko Fujiie – violin
- Toshiki Fujisawa – cello
- Akane Irie – violin
- Jōsei – piano
- Eriko Kawano – viola
- Chieko Kinbara – violin
- Nagisa Kiriyama – violin
- Ayumu Koshikawa – violin
- Yutaka Kozawa – cello
- Jō Kuwata – violin
- Yoshihiko Maeda – cello
- Haruki Matsuba – cello
- Midorin – drums
- Kioko Miki – violin
- Tatsuo Ogura – violin
- Naoko Okisawa – cello
- Takayuki Oshikane – violin
- Jun Saitō – contrabass
- Neko Saito – conductor
- Teruhiko Saitō – contrabass
- Ringo Sheena – vocals, songwriting
- Masaaki Shigematsu – cello
- Tomoko Shimaoka – viola
- Kon Shirasu – violin
- Ruka Suzuki – viola
- Mayu Takashima – viola
- Kōjirō Takizawa – violin
- Takashi Taninaka – contrabass
- Manami Tokutaka – viola
- Chizuko Tsunoda – violin
- Haruko Yano – violin

== Chart rankings ==
Chart (2009)	Peak position
Japan Billboard Adult Contemporary Airplay	26
Japan Billboard Japan Hot 100	36

== Release history ==
Region	Date	Format	Distributing Label
Japan	June 1, 2009	Ringtone, cellphone download	EMI Music Japan
Japan	June 24, 2009	PC download	EMI Music Japan
