= Sanmon Gossip =

Sanmon Gossip 三文ゴシップ

Studio album by Ringo Sheena
- Released: June 24, 2009
- Genres: Jazz pop, acid jazz
- Length: 50:05
- Labels: EMI Music Japan (Distributor); Virgin Music (Label)
- Producers: Bakeneko Killer (Ringo Sheena & Uni Inoue)

Ringo Sheena chronology
Watashi to Hōden (2008)	Sanmon Gossip 三文ゴシップ (2009)	Saturday Night Gossip (2009)

Sanmon Gossip (三文ゴシップ; "The Threepenny Gossip"), also known as Superficial Gossip, is the fourth studio album by Japanese singer-songwriter Ringo Sheena, released on June 24, 2009, in Japan and Korea through EMI Music Japan and Virgin Music and released in Taiwan on June 26. The album debuted at number 1 with 120,446 units sold and is certified Gold by the Recording Industry Association of Japan.

== Background ==
It was 2 years and 4 months since she had last released an album under the name Ringo Sheena and was also the first time in about six years since she released an album on her own because her previous album, Heisei Fūzoku was released as a joint project with Neko Saito.

Ringo Sheena composed all 14 songs, and she collaborated with various musicians and producers such as Neko Saito, Takayuki Hattori, Masayuki Hiizumi, Ukigumo, and Soil & "Pimp" Sessions. Each song was given the various elements, such as pop, rock, jazz, hip-hop, and orchestra.

All songs, except 2 songs, "Karisome Otome" and "Marunouchi Sadistic," are new compositions. Karisome Otome (Death Jazz ver.)," released before by digital distribution, is featured on the album, and "Marunouchi Sadistic (Expo Ver.)," used as background music at the ending of her concert "Ringo Expo 08," is featured as a bonus track.

The track list is symmetric about the middle song (excluding the bonus track "Marunouchi Sadistic (Expo Ver.)"), as has been the case with all her albums except Muzai Moratorium.

This album title comes from the Gibson SG, an idea which she hit upon before Heisei Fūzoku was completed. Although she was charmed by the shape of the SG, she had not used it. At that time she thought that she would make the album of the jacket using an SG and that started the naming of this album. She associated the word "Sanmon" with "S" and the word "Gossip" with "G", which are her favorite words.

The song "Shun" was covered by R&B musician Daichi Miura on his tour, Daichi Miura Live Tour 2010: Gravity, on November 20, 2009.

== Track listing ==
All lyrics are written by Ringo Sheena unless otherwise noted; all music is composed by Ringo Sheena.

CD
No.	Title	Lyrics	Arranger(s)	Length
1.	"Ryūkō" (流行, "Vogue")	Ringo Sheena; Rap: Mummy D	Masayuki Hiizumi & Ringo Sheena	4:16
2.	"Rōdōsha" (労働者, "Laborer")		Takafumi Ikeda	5:01
3.	"Mittei Monogatari" (密偵物語, "The secret agent story")	Jack Brown	Takayuki Hattori	3:10
4.	"Zero Chiten Kara" (〇地点から, "From ground zero")		Nobuhiko Nakayama & Bakeneko Killer	3:18
5.	"Karisome Otome" (カリソメ乙女, "Temporary virgin")		Soil & "Pimp" Sessions	2:29
6.	"Tsugō no Ii Karada" (都合のいい身体, "The convenient body")		Neko Saitō	3:14
7.	"Shun" (旬, "Season")		J.A.M (from Soil & "Pimp" Sessions); Strings arrangement: Neko Saitō	4:47
8.	"Futari-bocchi Jikan" (二人ぼっち時間, Time of just the two of us)		Neko Saitō	3:05
9.	"Mayakashi Yasaotoko" (マヤカシ優男, "Fake gentleman")		Soil & "Pimp" Sessions	3:57
10.	"Togatta Teguchi" (尖った手口, Sharp Method)	Ringo Sheena; Rap: Mummy D	Nobuhiko Nakayama & Mr. Drunk & Bakeneko Killer	3:02
11.	"Irokoizata" (色恋沙汰, "Love affair")		Takayuki Hattori	3:00
12.	"Bonsai Hada" (凡才肌, "Ordinary ability")		coba & Ringo Sheena	3:48
13.	"Yokyō" (余興, "Sideshow")		Yukio Nagoshi	3:53
14.	"Marunouchi Sadistic (EXPO Ver.)"		Ukigumo	2:59
Total length:				50:05

Note

- All the official English titles are given at Ringo Sheena's website.

== Personnel ==
Ryūkō

- vocals: Ringo Sheena
- wurlitzer electric piano: Masayuki Hiizumi (Pe'z)
- drums: Kō (Pe'z)
- bass guitars: Masahiro Nirehara (Pe'z)
- electric guitars: Tomoyasu Takeuchi (Maboroshi)
- rap: Daisuke Sakama / Mummy-D (Maboroshi)
- clap: All the members

Rōdōsha

- vocals: Ringo Sheena
- keyboards & backup vocals: Takafumi Ikeda (100s)
- drums & percussions: Tom Tamada (100s)
- bass guitars: Hiroo Yamaguchi (100s)

Mittei Monogatari

- vocals: Ringo Sheena
- organ: Nobuo Kurata
- electric guitars: Masayoshi Furukawa
- upright bass: Hitoshi Watanabe
- drums: Tomoo Tsuruya
- Latin percussions: Masato Kawase
- flute: Hideyo Takakuwa
- trumpet: Koji Nishimura, Hitoshi Yokoyama
- trombone: Yoichi Murata
- alto saxophone: Bob Zung
- tenor saxophone: Osamu Koike
- baritone saxophone: Masakuni Takeno
- vibraphone: Yoshihiko Katori
- conductor: Takayuki Hattori

Zero Chiten Kara

- vocals, piano & lead synthesizer: Ringo Sheena
- Music sequencer (programming & manipulate): Nobuhiko Nakayama
- electric sitar & guitars: Yukio Nagoshi
- flute, ocarina & bass ocarina: Hideyo Takakuwa

Karisome Otome (DEATH JAZZ ver.)

- vocals: Ringo Sheena
- performance: Soil & "Pimp" Sessions

Tsugō no Ii Karada

- vocals: Ringo Sheena
- piano: Hideo Ichikawa
- guitars: Sadanori Nakamure
- bass guitars: Kenji Takamizu
- drums: Shuichi "Ponta" Murakami
- Latin percussions: Mataro Misawa
- classic percussions: Midori Takada
- trumpet: Koji Nishimura, Hitoshi Yokoyama, Masahiko Sugasaka, Mitsukuni Kohata
- trombone: Yoichi Murata, Akira Okumura, Hiroki Hakoyama, Tsutomu Ikeshiro
- alto saxophone: Masakuni Takeno, Kei Suzuki
- tenor saxophone: Koji Shiraishi, Ryoji Ihara
- baritone saxophone: Takuo Yamamoto
- horn: Otohiko Fujita, Kenshow Hagiwara, Yasushi Katumata, Shunsuke Kimura
- tuba: Kiyoshi Sato
- flute: Hideyo Takakuwa, Maiko Seino
- oboe: Satoshi Shoji
- clarinet: Masashi Togame
- bassoon: Osamu Fukui
- harp: Tomoyuki Asakawa
- concert master: Great Eida
- violin: Kojiro Takizawa, Chieko Kinbara, Hitoshi Konno, Takayuki Oshikane, Haruko Yano, Genichiro Nakajima, Tomoko Abe, Tatsuo Ogura, Nagisa Kiriyama, Kioko Miki, Kanako Sakata, Midori Eida, Kon Shirasu, Ayumu Koshikawa, Chizuko Tsunoda
- viola: Yuji Yamada, Toshiki Akiyama, Amiko Watabe, Mayu Takashima, Sachie Onuma, Aiko Hosokawa
- cello: Yoshihiko Maeda, Ayano Kasahara, Masashi Abe, Seigen Tokuzawa, Wataru Mukai, Erika Yokooka
- upright bass: Jun Saito, Teruhiko Saito, Shigeki Ippon, Akio Ando
- conductor: Neko Saito

Shun

- vocals: Ringo Sheena
- piano: Josei (Soil & "Pimp" Sessions)
- upright bass: Akita Goldman (Soil & "Pimp" Sessions)
- drums: Midorin (Soil & "Pimp" Sessions)
- concert master: Great Eida
- violin: Kojiro Takizawa, Chieko Kinbara, Haruko Yano, Takayuki Oshikane, Akane Irie, Jou Kuwata, Tomoko Abe, Tatsuo Ogura, Nagisa Kiriyama, Motoko Fujiie, Midori Sakaeda, Kioko Miki, Kon Shirasu, Ayumu Koshikawa, Chizuko Tsunoda
- viola: Toshiki Akiyama, Eriko Kono, Tomoko Shimaoka, Manami Tokudaka, Ruca Suzuki, Mayu Takashima
- cello: Yoshihiko Maeda, Haruki Matsuba, Masaaki Shigematsu, Yutaka Ozawa, Toshiki Fujisawa, Naoko Okisawa
- upright bass: Jun Saito, Teruhiko Saito, Takashi Taninaka, Kazuki Chiba
- conductor: Neko Saito

Futari-bocchi Jikan

- vocals: Ringo Sheena
- guitar: Sadanori Nakamure, Fumio Yanagisawa
- upright bass: Kenji Takamizu
- drums: Hideo Yamaki
- Latin percussions: Tamao Fujii, Yuko Takashima
- glockenspiel: Midori Takada
- vibraphone: Marie Oishi
- trumpet: Koji Nishimura, Hitoshi Yokoyama, Masahiro Kobayashi, Mitsuru Tanaka
- trombone: Yoichi Murata, Akira Okumura, Hiroki Sato, Junko Yamashiro
- alto saxophone: Masato Honda, Kei Suzuki
- tenor saxophone: Masakuni Takeno, Osamu Yoshida
- baritone saxophone: Takuo Yamamoto
- conductor: Neko Saito
- tap dance: Kazunori Kumagai

Mayakashi Yasaotoko

- vocals: Ringo Sheena
- performance: Soil & "Pimp" Sessions

Togatta Teguchi

- vocals: Ringo Sheena
- programming & manipulate: Nobuhiko Nakayama
- electric sitar & guitars: Yukio Nagoshi
- rap: Mummy-D

Irokoizata

- vocals: Ringo Sheena
- Rhodes piano: Nobuo Kurata
- upright bass: Hitoshi Watanabe
- drums: Tomoo Tsuruya
- guitars: Masayoshi Furukawa
- Latin percussions: Masato Kawase
- trombone: Yoichi Murata
- vibraphone: Yoshihiko Katori
- concert master: Chieko Kinbara
- violin: Haruko Yano, Noriyo Obayashi, Jou Kuwata, Osamu Iyoku, Yukiko Iwato, Great Eida, Nagisa Kiriyama, Yu Manabe, Yuko Okubo, Takayuki Oshikane, Motoko Fujiie
- viola: Yuji Yamada, Takahiro Enokido, Sachie Onuma, Amiko Watabe
- cello: Akio Ueki, Ayano Kasahara
- conductor: Takayuki Hattori

Bonsai Hada

- vocals: Ringo Sheena
- accordion: coba

Yokyō

- vocals: Ringo Sheena
- guitars: Yukio Nagoshi
- bass guitars: Maki Kitada (Syrup16g)
- drums: Ken-ichi Shirane (Great3)
- chorus & clap: Mayumi Sugiyama, Yuko Sugiyama, Nanae Mizushima, Yumi Ota & Mari Kawashima & Setsuko Kawataki & Rie Byoudo (Kuronekodow)

Marunouchi Sadistic(EXPO Ver.)

- vocals: Ringo Sheena
- chorus: Ukigumo (Tokyo Jihen)
- bass: Jungo Miura（Petrolz）
- programming: Uni Inoue

== Charts and certifications ==
=== Charts ===
Chart (2009)	Peak Position
Japan Oricon Daily Albums Chart	1
Japan Oricon Weekly Albums Chart	1
Japan Oricon Monthly albums chart	6
Japan Oricon yearly albums chart	39

=== Sales and certifications ===
Country	Provider	Sales	Certification
Japan	RIAJ	202,000	Gold
