= Keitarō =

Keitarō is a Japanese given name. The spelling varies.

== People ==
=== 啓太郎 ===
- Keitarō Arima (born 1969), manga artist, author of Tsukuyomi -Moon Phase- among others
- Izawa Keitaro, member of Appa and the band Tokyo Incidents

=== 慶太郎 ===
- Motonaga Keitaro, director of the anime To Heart: Remember My Memories, Amaenaideyo!!, Lovely Idol, Iczer Girl Iczelion, Kikaider 01: The Animation, Yumeria, GetBackers, Magic Knight Rayearth OVA and School Days

=== 敬太郎 ===
- Keitarō Takanami, founder and former member of pop group Pizzicato Five

=== To be sorted ===
- Kondo Keitaro, author, recipient of the Akutagawa Prize
- Keitaro Konnai (born 1978), swimmer
- Keitaro Hara, chief equipping officer on the Japanese cruiser Haguro and later captain of Japanese battleship Ise and then Japanese battleship Nagato
- Keitaro Hoshino (born 1969), boxer
- Inoue Keitaro, martial artist, see Tenjin Shin'yō-ryū
- Keitaro Miho, one of the composers for the film Les plus belles escroqueries du monde

== Characters ==
=== 景太郎 ===
- Keitarō Urashima, main protagonist of the manga Love Hina

=== 敬太郎 ===
- Keitarō Shido, character in the tokusatsu television series Kamen Rider (Skyrider)
- Keitarō Jin, character in the tokusatsu television series Kamen Rider X
- Takeda Keitarou, character in the manga Majin Tantei Nōgami Neuro

=== 啓太郎 ===
- Keitarō Kikuchi, character in the tokusatsu television series Kamen Rider 555

=== To be sorted ===
- Keitarō Kiyomasa, character in the manga The Kindaichi Case Files.
- Keitarō Mizuno, character in the anime Texhnolyze.
- Keitaro Sasakawa, character in the drama series Tokyo Friends.
- Keitarō Toukichi, character in the manga Princess Comet.
