= News (EP) =

EP by Tokyo Jihen
- Released: April 8, 2020
- Genre: Avant-pop
- Length: 20:00
- Label: EMI
- Producer: Uni Inoue, Tokyo Jihen

Tokyo Jihen chronology
Hard Disk (2013)	News (2020)	Ongaku (2021)

News (ニュース) is the fifth extended play by Japanese rock band Tokyo Jihen. It was released on April 8, 2020 through EMI Records. The album was produced by the band and Japanese recording engineer Uni Inoue. On January 1, 2020, the single "Erabarezaru Kokumin" was released along with the tour "Live Tour 2020 News Flash", which began February 29 and ended April 9. The tour started on the same day they dissolved on February 29, 2012, a leap day.

== Track listing ==
All lyrics written by Ringo Sheena and all tracks arranged by Tokyo Jihen.

No.	Title	Music	Length
1.	"The Lower Classes" (選ばれざる国民 Erabarezaru Kokumin)	Ukigumo	4:12
2.	"Leap & Peal" (うるうるうるう Uru Uru Uruu)	Ichiyō Izawa	4:09
3.	"Active Players" (現役プレイヤー Geneki Player)	Seiji Kameda	3:00
4.	"The Cat From Outer Space" (猫の手は借りて Neko no Te wa Karite)	Toshiki Hata	4:15
5.	"The Scarlet Alibi" (永遠の不在証明 Eien no Fuzai Shoumei)	Ringo Sheena	4:23
Total length:			20:00

All official international English titles from Tidal.

== Personnel ==
Credits adapted from Tidal.

Tokyo Jihen

- Ringo Sheena – lead vocals
- Ichiyō Izawa – keyboards, vocals
- Ukigumo – guitar, vocals
- Seiji Kameda – bass
- Toshiki Hata – drums, vocals

Additional personnel

- Uni Inoue – record engineering, mix engineering

== Charts and sales ==
=== Charts ===
Chart (2020)	Peak Position
Japan Oricon Weekly Albums Chart	2
Taiwan G-music East Asia Albums	3

=== Sales ===
Chart	Amount
Oricon sales	30,407
