= Ongaku =

Music

Studio album by Tokyo Jihen
- Released: June 9, 2021
- Genre: Rock; pop; jazz
- Length: 45:10
- Label: EMI
- Producer: Uni Inoue, Tokyo Jihen

Tokyo Jihen chronology
News (2020)	Music (2021)

Singles from News
- 1. "Aka no dōmei" Released: August 12, 2020; 2. "Ao no ID" Released: November 6, 2020; 3. "Inochi no tobari" Released: November 13, 2020; 4. "Yaminaru shiro" Released: January 23, 2021; 5. "Ryokushu" Released: March 30, 2021

Music (音楽 (ミュージック)) is the sixth studio album by Japanese rock band Tokyo Jihen, released on June 9, 2021, through EMI Records. The album was produced by the band and recording engineer Uni Inoue.

== Background ==
Tokyo Jihen had dissolved in 2012 and had only briefly unofficially reunited on December 31, 2016, as Shiina Ringo's backing band in the 67th NHK Kōhaku Uta Gassen. On January 1, 2020, Tokyo Jihen released a surprise digital single, "Erabarezaru Kokumin", and announced a tour of Japan titled "Live Tour 2020 News Flash", beginning February 29. In February, the band announced their 5-song EP News would be released on April 8, 2020.

On April 23, 2021, it was announced that the band would release their first full album after resuming activities on June 9, which is "Rock Day". At the same time, the album art and new artist photos of the band members were released, and a special site for the album was opened. On May 13, the music video of "Ryokushu", which was pre-distributed at the end of March, was released on YouTube. On June 3, as the album's release was approaching, a teaser video of the album was released.

== Recording ==
The recording of the album itself started in 2018, before the announcement of the band's reunion, and "Ryokushu" and "Aka no dōmei" were completed first. Recording continued intermittently after that until the band announced their reunion on January 1, 2020. Shiina wrote the lyrics for the new songs from January to March 2021, and recorded the songs to finish the whole thing.

This album includes various genres such as hip-hop, funk, soul, and rock. Additionally, Shiina said the album's chord work as "may be more jazz than funk", citing Miles Davis and Roy Hargrove as similarities. As with previous releases by the band and Shiina Ringo, the track listing has certain symmetries. Tracks 6 ("青のID", "Blue Period") and 8 ("赤の同盟", "Red Alliance") are both named after colors, while odd-number songs all feature male vocalists. The single "Blue Period" (青のID) served as the theme song of the 2020 film Sakura.

== Chart performance ==
In the first week of its release, the album reached the second place in CD sales (43,599 copies) and the 1st place in digital downloads (4,363) at Billboard Japan and its comprehensive "Hot Albums" chart. In addition, according to the Oricon "Weekly Album Ranking", Ongaku sold 42,904 copies in the first week, and made its debut in 2nd place. It also made its debut in 2nd place on "Oricon Combined Albums" with 49,886 points.

== Track listing ==
All lyrics are written by Shiina Ringo. All tracks arranged by Tokyo Jihen except for "Ippuku", arranged by Shiina Ringo.

No.	Title	Music	Length
1.	"Kujaku" (孔雀, "Peacock")	Ukigumo; Shiina Ringo	1:59
2.	"Dokumi" (毒味, "Foretaste")	Seiji Kameda	4:03
3.	"Shiden" (紫電, "Lightning")	Ichiyo Izawa	3:38
4.	"Inochi no tobari" (命の帳, "Veil Of Life")	Ichiyo Izawa	3:38
5.	"Ōgonhi" (黄金比, "The Golden Ratio")	Ukigumo	4:17
6.	"Ao no ID" (青のID, "Blue Period")	Shiina Ringo	3:44
7.	"Yaminaru shiro" (闇なる白, "Whiteout")	Ichiyo Izawa	3:03
8.	"Aka no dōmei" (赤の同盟, "Red Alliance")	Ichiyo Izawa	4:09
9.	"Ginga-min" (銀河民, "The Galactic Man")	Ukigumo; Ichiyo Izawa	4:08
10.	"Kemono no kotowari" (獣の理, "View Of Life")	Seiji Kameda	2:56
11.	"Ryokushu" (緑酒, "Awakening")	Ichiyo Izawa	4:06
12.	"Kusurizuke" (薬漬, "Overdose")	Ichiyo Izawa	3:08
13.	"Ippuku" (一服, "Breather")	Shiina Ringo	2:14
Total length:			45:10

Disc 2: Aka no dōmei (赤の同盟, Red Alliance) (first press limited edition)
No.	Title	Music	Length
1.	"Aka no dōmei" (赤の同盟 "Red Alliance")	Ichiyo Izawa	4:09
2.	"Meijitsu tomoni" (名実共に "Sweetie Reasons")	Ichiyo Izawa	3:20
3.	"Gyokuza no wana" (玉座の罠 "The Lost Throne")	Ukigumo	3:09
Total length:			10:32
