= Appa (band) =

Japanese rock band

- Origin: Tokyo, Japan
- Genres: J-pop, rock
- Years active: 2004–Present
- Label: [Independent record label]
- Members: Keitaro Izawa; Kazuto Satō; Hideaki Hotta
- Website: http://appa.web.infoseek.co.jp/

Appa (あっぱ) is a Japanese rock band formed in 2004 by Keitaro Izawa, Kazuto Satō, and Hideaki Hotta. Since Izawa is well grounded in jazz and classical music, Appa's music is influenced by them. The biggest feature of the playing style of Appa is Izawa's piano playing. Izawa, who is the leader of Appa, is one of the members of Tokyo Jihen (from 2005).

In 2004, Izawa, who had quit his band NAM, formed a band named "Appa" with Satō and Hotta. They often held live performances, but not so many people came to like them. After Izawa joined Tokyo Jihen, however, Appa got a lot of fans, most of whom were fans of Tokyo Jihen. They have released two CDs up to now.

== Members ==
- Keitaro Izawa (伊澤啓太郎) - Piano, Vocal

Born in 1976, 7/4. From Kurashiki

- Hideaki Hotta (堀田秀顕) - Electric Bass
- Kazuto Satō (佐藤一人) - Drums

== Discography ==
- Appa (released in 2005.4/30)
1. Kimochi Yo (Feels Good) (きもちよ)
2. Hachiroku Ouenka (Hachiroku Cheering Song) (ハチロク応援歌)
3. Uso (Lie) (嘘)
4. Ikasama (A Hoax) (イカサマ)
5. Yopparatta SONG (Drunken Song) (酔っ払ったSONG)
- GIGS
1. Gypsy (ジプシー)
2. Kimochi Yo (Feels Good) (きもちよ)
3. Hachiroku Ouenka (Hachiroku Cheering Song) (ハチロク応援歌)
4. Uso (Lie) (嘘)
5. Zakkubaran (Frankness) (ざっくばらん)
6. Tenjou Afro (An Afro In Heaven) (天上アフロ)
7. Utsute Ari (I Have Another Strategy) (うつてあり)
8. Haha no Hikari (Mother's Light) (母の光)

Bonus Track.Sullen(むっつり)

- Umareku: The origin of the Tokyo Jihen song, A Letter (手紙).
