= Ukigumo =

Ukigumo (Japanese, 'drifting or floating cloud(s)') may refer to:

- Ukigumo (novel), by Futabatei Shimei, 1887
- Ukigumo, a 1951 novel by Fumiko Hayashi
- Floating Clouds, a 1955 film based on Hayashi's novel
- Ukigumo, stage name of Ryosuke Nagaoka (born 1978), Japanese guitarist and songwriter

== See also ==
- Drifting Clouds (film), 1996 Finnish film
