= Watashi to Hōden =

"Watashi to Houden" "私と放電"

Compilation album by Shiina Ringo
- Released: July 2, 2008
- Genre: J-pop
- Label: Toshiba EMI; Virgin Music

Shiina Ringo chronology
Heisei Fūzoku (2007)	"Watashi to Houden" "私と放電" (2008)	Sanmon Gossip (2009)

Watashi to Houden (私と放電, Me and Electric Discharge), also known as Electric Discharge & Me, is a compilation album by Japanese singer and songwriter Ringo Sheena. It features most of her B-sides and rarer songs from her solo era, and was released to celebrate her 10th anniversary in the industry. The music video collection DVD "Watashi no Hatsuden (私の発電, My Generator)" was released on the same day.

== Outline ==
The songs were either not featured in previous full albums, or were at least non-album versions. However, not all non-album songs were released in this compilation.

The music video of "Mellow" was produced for this release. The clip was recorded the DVD "Watashi no Hatsuden".

== Track listing ==
All tracks written by Ringo Sheena, except where noted.

Disc 1
No.	Title	Writer(s)	Taken from	Length
1.	"Slide" (すべりだい Suberidai)		Kōfukuron
2.	"Unconditional Love" (アンコンディショナル・ラブ Ankondishonaru rabu)	Cyndi Lauper; Tom Kelly; Billy Steinberg	Kabukichō no Joō
3.	"Remote Control" (リモートコントローラー Rimōtokontorōrā)		Koko de Kiss Shite.
4.	"Vertigo" (眩暈 Memai)		Koko de Kiss Shite.
5.	"Transmigration Highlights" (輪廻ハイライト Rinne Hairaito)		Honnō
6.	"Blue Sky" (あおぞら Aozora)		Honnō
7.	"Time Drives Recklessly" (時が暴走する Toki ga Bousou Suru)		Kōfukuron
8.	"Σ" (Sigma)		Gips
9.	"Tokyo Lady" (東京の女 Tōkyō no Hito)	Michio Yamagami; Kenji Sawada	Gips
10.	"17"		Tsumi to Batsu
11.	"Can't Take My Eyes Off You" (君ノ瞳ニ恋シテル Kimi no Hitomi ni Koi Shiteru)	Bob Crewe; Bob Gaudio	Tsumi to Batsu

Disc 2
No.	Title	Writer(s)	Taken from	Length
1.	"Mellow" (メロウ Merō)	Makoto Totani; Sheena	Zecchōshū
2.	"Unhappy Pride" (不幸自慢 Fukou Jiman)		Zecchōshū
3.	"So Cold" (喪＠CｴNｺ瑠ｦｭWｧ#)		Zecchōshū
4.	"Your Breakfast" (愛妻家の朝食 Aisaika no Chōshoku)		Mayonaka wa Junketsu
5.	"Sid & Daydreams" (シドと白昼夢 Shido to hakuchūmu)		Mayonaka wa Junketsu
6.	"Consciously (A Song From One of the Greatest Rainstorms of the Post-war Era)" (意識~戦後最大級ノ暴風雨圏内歌唱 Ishiki ~Sengo Saidaikyū no Bōfūu Kennai Kashō~)		Kuki (Stem) ~Daimyou Asobi hen~
7.	"Camouflage (A Song From One of the Greatest Rainstorms of the Post-war Era)" (迷彩~戦後最大級ノ暴風雨圏内歌唱~ Meisai ~Sengo Saidaikyū no Bōfūu Kennai Kashō~)		Kuki (Stem) ~Daimyou Asobi hen~
8.	"La Salle de Bain"	Sheena; Robbie Clark	Ringo no Uta
9.	""Temporary" Virgin (Hitokuchizaka Ver.)" (カリソメ乙女 Karisome Otome)		Kono Yo no Kagiri
10.	"Confusion (Onkio Ver.)" (錯乱 Sakuran)		Kono Yo no Kagiri
11.	"Fig Flower" (映日紅の花 Ichijiku no Hana)		Kalk Samen Kuri no Hana
12.	"It Expanded" (膨らんできちゃった Fukurande kichatta) (bonus track)		Zecchōshū
13.	"Crawling" (はいはい Hai Hai) (bonus track)	Sheena; Hisako Tabuchi	Zecchōshū
14.	"Photosynthesis" (光合成 Kougousei) (bonus track)		Zecchōshū
