= Junpei Shiina =

- Born: August 6, 1974 (age 52); Japan
- Origin: Saitama, Saitama, Japan
- Genres: Rhythm and blues, soul
- Occupation: Singer-songwriter
- Instruments: Vocals, piano
- Years active: 1999–present
- Labels: Sony Music Japan, R and C, King Records

Junpei Shiina (椎名 純平, Shiina Junpei; born August 6, 1974), is a Japanese rhythm and blues singer and songwriter, and older brother to the musician Ringo Sheena. Debuting as a soloist in 1999, Shiina released four albums with major label Sony Music Japan between 2001 and 2004, later signing a contract with R and C to release his fourth album Cruisin' (2006). In 2008 Shiina formed the band Junpei Shiina & The Soul Force, who renamed themselves Dezille Brothers in 2010, releasing their debut album Dashi no Torikata through King Records in the same year. In 2014, Shiina formed the four member band Hitosarai with Tomotaka Imamichi.

Shiina has often collaborated with his sister Ringo Sheena by singing duets together, most notably the theme song of the Mika Ninagawa directed film Sakuran (2007), "Kono Yo no Kagiri".

== Biography ==
Junpei Shiina was born in Urawa, Saitama on August 6, 1974. He first began learning the piano at five years of age, and in high school became a part of his school's brass band, learning how to play the drums. In 1998 he began songwriting, and in 1999 won the grand prize at the Sony Music SDN 'The Another Goal '99' auditions. Shiina released his first album, Live, in December 1999 through the Sony Music Japan imprint Knockers Records, later debuting properly under Sony in November 2000 with the Shinichi Osawa-produced single "Sekai". His second single "Mujō" was used as an insert song for the Miho Kanno-starring drama Nisenichi-nen no Otoko Un.

Though Shiina often worked with producers, many of his songs were performed and arranged by himself, with his back-up band the Evil Vibrations: guitarist Ryosuke Nagaoka, drummers Takeshi Hatae and Toshiki Hata, bassist Tomohiko Ohkanda and Soil & "Pimp" Sessions member Tabu Zombie on trumpet. The Evil Vibrations recorded much of his debut album Shiina Junpei, which was released in July 2001. In 2002, Shiina collaborated with his sister Ringo Sheena on three cover duets, beginning with Toto's "Georgy Porgy", which they recorded together as a part of a special unit called Yokoshima, featuring Jumpei Shiina on keyboards and Ringo Sheena on chorus. The siblings both released cover albums in May 2002: Junpei Shiina's, Discover, featured a cover of Roberta Flack and Donny Hathaway's 1972 duet "Where Is the Love" sung with his sister, while Ringo Sheena's, Utaite Myōri: Sono Ichi, featured the pair dueting Marvin Gaye and Tammi Terrell's "The Onion Song" (1969). In addition to his sister, Shiina's album Discover featured collaborations with rapper Twigy, members of Tokyo Ska Paradise Orchestra and singer-songwriter Daisuke Kawaguchi.

In June 2003, Shiina released his second original album Amai Yoru no Kaori, led by the single "Time of Gold", a duet with Ryoko Shinohara used in a Japanese commercial campaign for Canada Dry ginger ale. In 2004, Shiina parted with Sony, after releasing the compilation album Rhodes to Freedom. Two years later, Shiina began to be managed by Kronekodow, his sister's personal management agency, and switched labels to R and C with the single "Zanzō" / "Zero-One". He released his third original album Cruisin' in November 2006. In January 2007, Shiina collaborated with his sister and composer Neko Saito on the song "Kono Yo no Kagiri", which was used as the theme song for the film Sakuran (2007) for which his sister was acting as the musical director for.

In 2008, Junpei Shiina formed the soul and funk band Junpei Shiina & the Soul Force, who later renamed themselves the Dezille Brothers in 2010. After performing at the Rising Sun Rock Festival in 2010, the group released their debut album Dashi no Torikata. In November 2014, Shiina began collaborating with guitarist Tomotaka Imamichi, when they formed the band Hitosarai (ヒトサライ).

== Artistry ==
Shiina is inspired by soul and R&B singers, including Marvin Gaye, Teddy Riley, D'Angelo and Donny Hathaway.

== Discography ==
=== Studio albums ===
List of albums, with selected chart positions
Title	Album details	Peak positions
Title	Album details	JPN
Shiina Junpei (椎名純平)	Released: July 18, 2001 (JPN); Label: Sony Music Japan; Formats: CD, LP Record	45
Discover	Cover album; Released: May 23, 2002 (JPN); Label: Sony; Formats: CD	84
Amai Yoru no Kaori (甘い夜の薫り; "The Scent of Sweet Nights")	Released: June 25, 2003 (JPN); Label: Sony; Formats: CD	209
Cruisin'	Released: November 22, 2006 (JPN); Label: R and C; Formats: CD	—
...and the Soul Remains	Released: July 3, 2016 (JPN); Label: Self-produced; Formats: CD	—
"—" denotes items that did not chart.

=== Compilation album ===
Title	Album details
Rhodes to Freedom	Released: October 27, 2004 (JPN); Label: Sony; Formats: CD

=== Live album ===
Title	Album details
Live	Released: December 18, 1999 (JPN); Label: Knockers Records; Formats: CD

=== Singles ===
==== As a lead artist ====
List of singles, with selected chart positions
Title	Year	Peak chart positions	Album
Title	Year	JPN Oricon	Album
"Sekai" (世界; "World")	2000	38	Shiina Junpei
"Mujō" (無情; "Cruelty")	2001	45	Shiina Junpei
"Mirai" (未来; "Future")	2001	—	Shiina Junpei
"Hakuchūmu" (白昼夢; "Daydreaming")	2001	—	Shiina Junpei
"Where Is the Love" (Junpei Shiina featuring Ringo Sheena)	2002	—	Discover
"Showtime" (ショウタイム, Shōtaimu)	2003	189	Amai Yoru no Kaori
"Time of Gold" (Junpei Shiina featuring Ryoko Shinohara)	2003	185	Amai Yoru no Kaori
"Zanzō" (残像; "After Image")	2006	—	Cruisin'
"Zero-One"	2006	—	Cruisin'
"Hikari no Umi" (ヒカリの海; "Sea of Light")	2006	—	Cruisin'
"Hotel Casablanca"	2006	—	Cruisin'
"—" denotes items that did not chart.

=== As a collaborating artist ===
List of singles, with selected chart positions
Title	Year	Peak chart positions	Certifications	Album
Title	Year	JPN Oricon	Certifications	Album
"Konomama" (このまま; "As It Is") (Twigy featuring Junpei Shiina)	2001	81		The Legendary Mr. Clifton
"Music Maker" (Dev Large featuring Junpei Shiina)	2001	59		Shiina Junpei
"Night Music" (Sugiurumn featuring Junpei Shiina)	2001	—		Life Ground Music
"Yūjō no Yell" (友情のエール; "Yell of Friendship") (among Yell from Nippon)	2006	38		Non-album singles
"Bartender" (バーテンダー, Bātendā) (Natural High featuring Junpei Shiina)	2006	161		Non-album singles
"Kono Yo no Kagiri" (この世の限り; "Limits of this World") (Ringo Sheena & Neko Saito + Junpei Shiina)	2007	8	RIAJ (physical): Gold	Heisei Fūzoku
"—" denotes items that did not chart.
