= Variety (Tokyo Jihen album) =

Studio album by Tokyo Jihen
- Released: September 26, 2007 (Japan)
- Recorded: 2007 at EMI 3st, Studio Terra
- Genre: Rock; jazz; funk
- Length: 49:45
- Label: EMI Music Japan (Distributor); Virgin Music (Label)
- Producer: Uni Inoue, Tokyo Jihen

Tokyo Jihen chronology
Adult (2006)	Variety (2007)	Sports (2010)

Singles from Variety
- 1. "OSCA" Released: July 11, 2007; 2. "Killer-tune" Released: August 22, 2007

Variety (娯楽 (バラエティ)) is the third studio album by Japanese band Tokyo Jihen, released on September 26, 2007, in Japan through EMI Music Japan and Virgin Music. The album was produced by the band and recording engineer Uni Inoue. The album contains thirteen tracks and spawned two singles. The lead single, "O.S.C.A.", was released on July 11, 2007. "Killer-tune" followed as the second single on August 22, 2007.

== Background ==
It's thirteen tracks were carefully selected from a vast number of demos created by the band, all of which featured music written by members other than lead vocalist Ringo Sheena. This was a different direction for the band, most of whose previous material had been composed by Ringo Sheena. The record includes seven tracks from guitarist Ukigumo, five tracks from keyboard player Ichiyo Izawa, and one composed by bassist Seiji Kameda. Drummer Toshiki Hata was also asked to contribute, but he declined.

After the album's release, the song "Kingyo no Hako" was picked to be the film Mōryō no Hako's theme song.

== Track listing ==
Credits adapted from Ringo Sheena's website.

All lyrics are written by Sheena except where noted, all tracks arranged by Tokyo Jihen.

No.	Title	Lyrics	Music	Length
1.	"Ramp" (ランプ Ranpu)		Ukigumo	3:04
2.	"Disco Ball" (ミラーボール Mirābōru)	Ukigumo	Ukigumo	4:26
3.	"Box of Goldfish" (金魚の箱 Kingyo no Hako)	Ichiyō Izawa	Izawa	3:25
4.	"Backstage" (私生活 Shiseikatsu)		Seiji Kameda	3:49
5.	"O.S.C.A." (OSCA)	Ukigumo	Ukigumo	4:25
6.	"My Way" (黒猫道 Kuroneko-dō)		Izawa	2:52
7.	"Vengeance" (復讐 Fukushū)		Ukigumo	4:11
8.	"The Citizens" (某都民 Bō Tomin)		Ukigumo	3:46
9.	"ss/aw" (SSAW)		Izawa	3:55
10.	"Princesse mensuelle" (月極姫 Tsukigime Hime)		Ukigumo	3:50
11.	"Sake & Nondrinker" (酒と下戸 Sake to Geko)		Izawa	4:14
12.	"Killer-tune" (キラーチューン Kirāchūn)		Izawa	3:43
13.	"Metro" (メトロ Metoro)	Ukigumo	Ukigumo	3:59

== Charts and certifications ==
=== Charts ===
Chart (2007)	Peak Position
Japan Oricon Daily Albums Chart	2
Japan Oricon Weekly Albums Chart	2
Japan Oricon Monthly albums chart	5
Japan Oricon yearly albums chart	75
Japan Soundscan Weekly Albums Chart	2

=== Sales and certifications ===
Country	Provider	Sales	Certification
Japan	RIAJ	175,000	Gold
