= Heisei Fūzoku =

Album by Ringo Sheena

Studio album by Ringo Sheena & Neko Saitō
- Released: February 21, 2007
- Recorded: Toshiba EMI 3rd Studio; Studio Terra; Hitokuchizaka Studio; Onkio Haus; AVACO Creative Studios; Sound City
- Genre: Jazz, música latinoamericana, electronica
- Length: 51:58
- Label: Toshiba EMI; Virgin Music
- Producer: Uni Inoue

Ringo Sheena & Neko Saitō chronology
Kalk Samen Kuri no Hana (2003)	Heisei Fūzoku (2007)	Watashi to Hōden (2008)

Singles from Heisei Fūzoku
- 1. "Kono Yo no Kagiri" Released: January 17, 2007

Heisei Fūzoku (平成風俗; "Heisei Customs"), also known as Japanese Manners, is a studio album by Japanese singer-songwriter Ringo Sheena and conductor and violinist Neko Saitō, released on February 21, 2007. The vinyl record version and the DVD "Daiginjou" were released on April 25, 2007. This album serves as the soundtrack for the movie Sakuran (さくらん).

== Background ==
Ringo Sheena initially intended to create a highly produced, computer-based sound for the soundtrack and went as far as to record some instrumental demos. However, director Mika Ninagawa demanded songs with lyrics, so she decided to record orchestrated versions using Neko Saitō's arrangements, which he had previously written for her concerts. Though she originally intended to make this album with Tokyo Jihen, drummer Toshiki Hata broke his leg and thus only the other band members were able to participate. Ukigumo played guitar on "Gamble" and wrote "Oiran", while Ichiyō Izawa played piano on "Gamble" and Seiji Kameda arranged "Yokushitsu". The song "Karisome Otome (Tameikesannoh Ver.)" was recorded in September 2006.

The term fūzoku (風俗), as used in the title, is also used to refer to prostitution and the Japanese sex industry. The film Sakuran is about an oiran, a high-ranking prostitute. The title of the album thus has a double meaning.

== Track listing ==
All tracks written by Ringo Sheena and arranged by Neko Saitō, except where noted.

=== Standard edition ===
No.	Title	Writer(s)	Arranger(s)	Length
1.	"Gamble" (ギャンブル Gyanburu)			5:53
2.	"Stem" (茎 Kuki)			4:27
3.	"Confusion (Terra Ver.)" (錯乱 Sakuran)			3:49
4.	"'Firstlove' Singer" (ハツコイ娼女 Hatsukoi Shōjo (Note: The literal translation is "first love prostitute."))			4:02
5.	"Papaya Mango" (パパイヤマンゴー Papaiya Mangō)	Sid Wayne; Dee Libbey		3:08
6.	"Consciously" (意識 Ishiki)			2:41
7.	"Bathroom" (浴室 Yokushitsu)		Saitō; Seiji Kameda; Sheena; Nobuhiko Nakayama; Uni Inoue	4:24
8.	"Camouflage" (迷彩 Meisai)			3:57
9.	"Poltergeist" (ポルターガイスト Porutāgaisuto)			3:00
10.	"Temporary Virgin (Tameikesannoh Ver.)" (カリソメ乙女 Karisome Otome)			2:49
11.	"Courtesan" (花魁 Oiran)	Ukigumo; Sheena	Saitō; Sheena	5:13
12.	"Scar" (夢のあと Yume no Ato)			5:03
13.	"Memory" (この世の限り Kono Yo no Kagiri (Note: The literal translation is "the limits of the world" or "the last chance in one's life."))			3:31
Total length:				51:57

=== Vinyl edition ===
Side A
No.	Title	Length
1.	"Gamble" (ギャンブル Gyanburu)	5:53
2.	"Stem" (茎 Kuki)	4:27
3.	"Confusion (Terra Ver.)" (錯乱 Sakuran)	3:49
4.	""Firstlove" Singer" (ハツコイ娼女 Hatsukoi Shōjo)	4:02

Side B
No.	Title	Writer(s)	Arranger(s)	Length
1.	"Papaya Mango" (パパイヤマンゴー Papaiya Mangō)	Sid Wayne; Dee Libbey		3:08
2.	"Consciously" (意識 Ishiki)			2:41
3.	"Bathroom" (浴室 Yokushitsu)		Saitō; Seiji Kameda; Sheena; Nobuhiko Nakayama; Uni Inoue	4:24
4.	"Camouflage" (迷彩 Meisai)			3:57
5.	"Poltergeist" (ポルターガイスト Porutāgaisuto)			3:00

Side C
No.	Title	Writer(s)	Arranger(s)	Length
1.	""Temporary" Virgin (Tameikesannoh Ver.)" (カリソメ乙女 Karisome Otome)			2:49
2.	"Courtesan" (花魁 Oiran)	Ukigumo; Sheena	Saitō; Sheena	5:13
3.	"Scar" (夢のあと Yume no Ato)			5:03
4.	"Memory" (この世の限り Kono Yo no Kagiri)			3:31

Side D
No.	Title	Arranger(s)	Length
1.	""Temporary" Virgin (Death Jazz Ver.)" (カリソメ乙女 Karisome Otome) (with Soil & "Pimp" Sessions)	Soil & "Pimp" Sessions	2:36
Total length:			53:35

Notes:

- "Papaya Mango" is a cover of Rosemary Clooney's 1957 single "Mangos."
- "Scars" is a cover of Tokyo Jihen's "A Scar of Dreams" (夢のあと, Yume no Ato).

== Credits and personnel ==
Song

- Ringo Sheena (#1-14)
- Shiina Junpei (#13)

Conductor

- Neko Saitō

Orchestras

- Komaeno Orchestra (コマエノオーケストラ, The orchestra in Komae) (#1)
- Noraneko Orchestra (ノラネコオーケストラ, The alley cat orchestra) (#2, 6, 9)
- Anoyono Orchestra (アノヨノオーケストラ, The orchestra of the other world) (#3)
- Nadataru Orchestra (ナダタルオーケストラ, The well-known Orchestra) (#4, 11)
- Matatabi Orchestra (マタタビオーケストラ, The silvervine orchestra) (#5, 7, 8, 12)
- Karisome Orchestra (カリソメオーケストラ, The temporary orchestra) (#10)
- Konoyono Orchestra (コノヨノオーケストラ, The orchestra of this world) (#13)
- Ringo Sheena×SOIL&"PIMP"SESSIONS (#14)

Violin

- Neko Saitō (#8)

Electric guitar

- Ukigumo (#1)

Piano

- Izawa Ichiyou (#1)

Drum machine

- Ringo Sheena (#4, 11)
- Nobuhiko Nakayama (#7)

== Heisei Fūzoku Daiginjō ==
Heisei Fūzoku Daiginjō (平成風俗 大吟醸, Heisei Customs, Very Special brew), (English title: Japanese Manners Premium) is a video DVD album by Ringo Sheena and Neko Saitō released on April 25, 2007 by Toshiba EMI / Virgin Music.

Every song from the album Heisei Fūzoku has animated graphics by spirited designers that were inspired by the album's songs.

Heisei Fūzoku Daiginjō 平成風俗 大吟醸

Video by Ringo Sheena, Neko Saitō
- Released: = April 25, 2007
- Genre: Jazz, Latin American music, Electronica
- Length: 1:13:00
- Label: Toshiba EMI, Virgin Music

Ringo Sheena, Neko Saitō chronology
Daiikkai Ringo-han Taikai no Moyō (2007)	Heisei Fūzoku Daiginjō 平成風俗 大吟醸 (2007)	Watashi no Hatsuden (2008)

=== Track listing ===
Audio tracks: 96kHz/24-bit sound quality
No.	Title	Length
1.	"Gamble" (Motion graphics)
2.	"Kuki" (Motion graphics)
3.	"Sakuran TERRA ver." (Motion graphics)
4.	"Hatukoi Shōjo" (Motion graphics)
5.	"Papaya Mango" (Motion graphics)
6.	"Ishiki" (Motion graphics)
7.	"Yokushitu" (Motion graphics)
8.	"Meisai" (Motion graphics)
9.	"Poltergeist" (Motion graphics)
10.	"Karisome Otome TAMEIKESANNOH ver." (Motion graphics)
11.	"Oiran" (Motion graphics)
12.	"Yume no Ato" (Motion graphics)
13.	"Konoyo no Kagiri" (Music video)
14.	"Karisome Otome DEATH JAZZ ver." (bonus track) (Motion graphics)

Special audio tracks: recorded in DTS 5.1-channel surround sound
No.	Title	Length
1.	"Sakuran TERRA ver." (Motion graphics)
2.	"Oiran" (Motion graphics)
3.	"La salle de bain" (Motion graphics)
