= Adult (album) =

Studio album by Tokyo Jihen
- Released: January 25, 2006
- Recorded: 2005–2006
- Studios: Toshiba EMI 3 st, Studio Terra, Kroneko Studio, Crescent Studio
- Genres: Rock; pop; jazz; soul; funk; bossa nova; kayōkyoku
- Length: 44:19
- Labels: Toshiba EMI (Distributor); Virgin Music (Label)
- Producers: Uni Inoue, Tokyo Jihen

Tokyo Jihen chronology
| Kyōiku (2004) | Adult (2006) | Variety (2007) |

Singles from Adult
- 1. "Shuraba" Released: November 2, 2005

Adult (大人（アダルト）) is the second studio album by Japanese alternative rock band Tokyo Jihen, released on January 25, 2006 in Japan through Toshiba EMI/ Virgin Music. The album was produced by the band and Japanese recording engineer Uni Inoue. The album reached number one on the Oricon Weekly Album Chart on February 6, 2006.

== Background ==
Adult marked the debut for guitarist Ukigumo and keyboardist Ichiyō Izawa, who joined Tokyo Jihen after the departure of previous members Mikio Hirama and H Zett M (Masayuki Hiizumi). Ringo Sheena, Ichiyō Izawa and Ukigumo played a key role in this album and arranged songs while arguing. About Shuraba, Sheena arranged the single version mainly, but, obeying Sheena’s wishes of not wanting to record the single version on the album as it is, Sheena, Izawa and Ukigumo re-arranged it based on the latter's proposal.

In 2008, "Keshō Naoshi" was covered in Portuguese by Kaori Hayato on her first album Pluma, and in concert by Kiyoshi Hasegawa, the recording of which was featured on his 40th anniversary album 40nen. Mada Kore ga Best de wa Nai..

== Track listing ==
Credits adapted from Ringo Sheena's website.

All lyrics are written by Sheena; all music is composed by Sheena and arranged by Tokyo Jihen, except where noted.

Standard Pour femme edition
| No. | Title | Music | Arranger(s) | Length |
|---|---|---|---|---|
| 1. | "A Secret" (秘密 Himitsu) | | Ichiyō Izawa | 3:52 |
| 2. | "Active Fighting" (喧嘩上等 Kenka Jōtō) | | | 2:22 |
| 3. | "Powder Up My Mind" (化粧直し Keshō Naoshi) | | | 5:03 |
| 4. | "Super Star" (スーパースター Sūpāsutā) | Seiji Kameda | | 4:29 |
| 5. | "The Rat's-nest" (adult version; 修羅場 Shuraba) | | | 4:42 |
| 6. | "Niigata" (雪国 Yukiguni) | | | 4:19 |
| 7. | "The Kabuki" (歌舞伎 Kabuki) | | | 1:59 |
| 8. | "Black Out" (ブラックアウト Burakkuauto) | | | 4:06 |
| 9. | "Don't Cry My Child" (黄昏泣き Tasogare Naki) | | | 3:28 |
| 10. | "Invisible Man" (透明人間 Tōmei Ningen) | Kameda | | 4:30 |
| 11. | "A Mail" (手紙 Tegami) | Izawa | Sheena | 5:24 |

Limited Pour homme edition bonus DVD
| No. | Title | Length |
|---|---|---|
| 1. | "A Secret" (秘密 Himitsu; live from the Dynamite! tour) |

== Personnel ==
Tokyo Jihen

- Ringo Sheena – lead vocals
- Ichiyō Izawa – keyboards
- Ukigumo – guitars
- Seiji Kameda – bass
- Toshiki Hata – drums

Additional personnel

- Uni Inoue - recording engineer, mixing, programming

Guest musicians

- Tabu Zombie from Soil & "Pimp" Sessions – trumpet on "Keshō Naoshi" & "Tasogare Naki"
- Yuichiro Goto Strings - string section on "Tegami"
- SabishimiGumi - nigiyakashi on "Himitsu" & "Kabuki"

== Charts and certifications ==
=== Charts ===
| Chart (2006) | Peak Position |
|---|---|
| Japan Oricon Daily Albums Chart | 1 |
| Japan Oricon Weekly Albums Chart | 1 |
| Japan Oricon Monthly albums chart | |
| Japan Oricon yearly albums chart | 44 |

=== Sales and certifications ===
| Country | Provider | Sales | Certification |
|---|---|---|---|
| Japan | RIAJ | 294,000 | Platinum |

== Release history ==
| Country | Release date |
|---|---|
| Japan | January 25, 2006 |
| Taiwan | February 14, 2006 |
