= Masayuki Hiizumi =

Masayuki Hiizumi 樋泉昌之
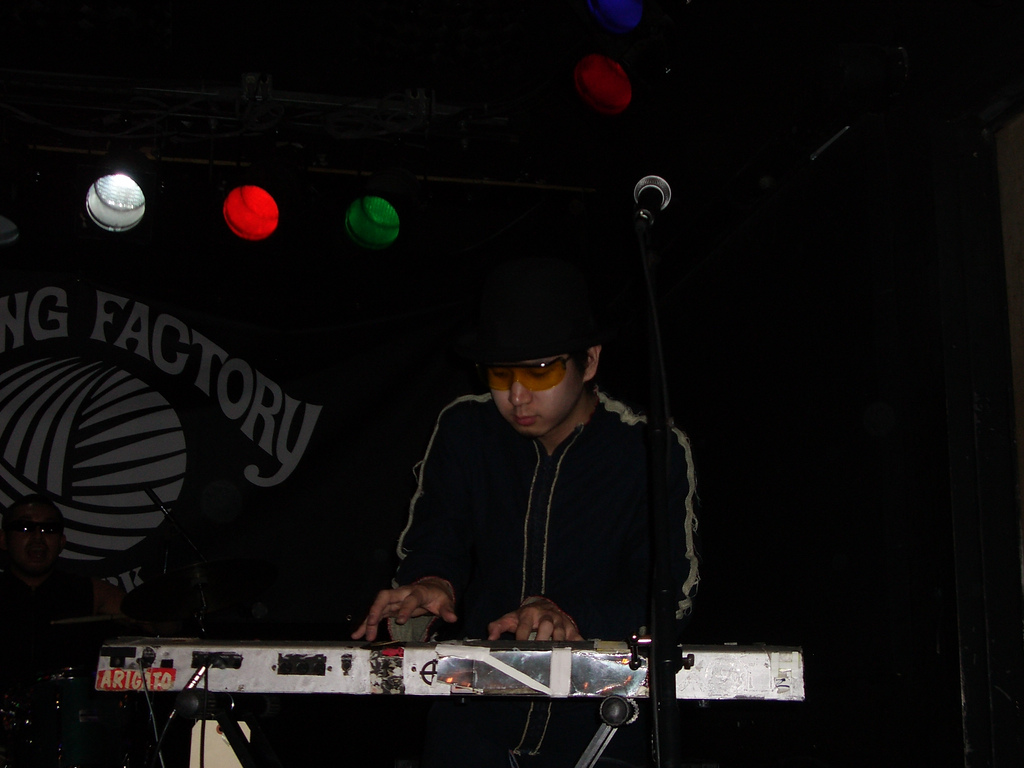
- Masayuki Hiizumi performing with Pe'z in 2006.

Background information
- Also known as: H Zett M, H Zetto M, HZM, HζM
- Born: February 12, 1978 (age 48); Kobe, Japan
- Origin: Japan
- Occupations: Record producer; keyboardist
- Instruments: Keyboards; vocals
- Years active: 1999–present
- Labels: BMG Japan; Apart
- Website: www.worldapart.co.jp/hzettm/

Masayuki Hiizumi (ヒイズミマサユ機, Hiizumi Masayuki; born February 12, 1978), also known by the name H Zett M (stylised as H ZETT M) is a Japanese keyboardist and producer. He became a member of jazz instrumental band Pe'z in 1999, and was a member of Ringo Sheena's band Tokyo Jihen between 2004 and 2005. In 2007, Hiizumi debuted as a solo musician with the name H Zett M.

== Biography ==
In 2001, Pe'z debuted with their self-titled extended play Pe'z, followed by Hayato and Okokoroire also in 2001. Their major debut release with Toshiba EMI, Akatsuki, was released in 2002.

In 2003, Hiizumi joined musician Ringo Sheena as a tour musician for her 10 date Sugoroku Tour. This tour band, Tokyo Jihen, debuted as a fully fledged musical act in 2004 with the single "Gunjō Biyori", which Hiizumi composed. The band's debut album Kyōiku was released in November 2004, also featuring his songs "Genjitsu ni Oite" and "Service", followed by the Dynamite tour in early 2005. Hiizumi decided to leave the band after the tour to focus on his work with Pe'z, and announced this on July 1, 2005.

In 2007, Hiizumi made his solo debut with the album 5+2=11. He also worked in the musical collaboration between Pe'z and folk singer Suzumoku, Pe'zmoku, and performed the Bleach ending theme song "Gallop".

Hiizumi collaborated with Pe'z members Masahiro Nirehara and Kou to create the jazz trio H Zettrio in 2013, and released the album Mitsuboshi on December 4, 2013. H Zettrio further collaborated with jazz singer-songwriter Roco to create the unit Chazz. The unit recorded the album Chazz: Smile Music Life, a collection of songs famous in children's music, performed in a jazz style with new lyrics.

== Names ==
Hiizumi uses a variety of stage names for different musical projects. JASRAC lists his name with the kanji 樋泉昌之 in the composition credits for his early works for Pe'z, but as a member of Pe'z he lists his name as ヒイズミマサユ機. As a member of Tokyo Jihen, he originally went under the name ヒーズミマサユ季 when the band performed Ringo Sheena's Sugoroku Tour, and as H Zetto M (H是都M) after the band's official debut. For his solo debut, he used the name H Zett M. On Ringo Sheena's live film Ringo Haku '14: Toshionna no Gyakushū, he is credited as Hiizumimasayu-KI.

== Discography ==
=== Studio albums ===
List of albums, with selected chart positions
Title	Album details	Peak positions
Title	Album details	JPN
5+2=11	Released: January 10, 2007; Label: BMG Japan; Formats: CD, CD/DVD	34
Pianohead	Released: February 13, 2008; Label: BMG; Formats: CD, CD/DVD	50
Mirai no Ongaku (未来の音楽; "Music of the Future")	Released: January 18, 2012; Label: Apart Records; Formats: 2CD, digital download	213
Mahōtsukai no Ongaku (魔法使いのおんがく; "The Music by Wizard")	Released: January 9, 2013; Label: Apart; Formats: 2CD, digital download	274

=== Project albums ===
List of albums, with selected chart positions
Title	Album details	Peak positions
Title	Album details	JPN
Kirakira Standard with PS60 (きらきら☆すたんだーどwith PS60)	Released: November 1, 2010; Label: Apart; Formats: CD	189
Kirakira Standard 2: Premium (ききらきら☆すたんだーど2 ～ぷれみあむ～)	Released: July 20, 2011; Label: Apart; Formats: CD	—
3D-Piano Anime Theater! CD	As H ZETT M x Akai Ryuusei x Marasy; Released: July 25, 2012; Label: Apart; Formats: CD	124
4D-Piano Anime Theater! CD	As H ZETT M x Akai Ryuusei x JimuinG x Marasy; Released: June 19, 2013; Label: Apart; Formats: CD	120
H Zett M feat. Hatsune Miku (初音ミク)	Released: June 19, 2013; Label: Apart; Formats: CD	—

=== Singles ===
List of singles, with selected chart positions
Title	Year	Peak chart positions	Album
Title	Year	Billboard Japan Hot 100 (Note: Sources for chart positions are as follows: "Daikirai".)	Album
"Daikirai" (ダイキライ; "Hate")	2008	29	Pianohead

=== Video albums ===
List of media, with selected chart positions
Title	Album details	Peak positions
Title	Album details	JPN
Pianoism in Osaka (ビアノイズ・イン・オオサカ)	Released: February 13, 2008; Label: Apart; Formats: DVD	61
Hikimakuri Destroy (弾きまくりDESTROY)	Released: February 3, 2010; Label: Apart; Formats: DVD	230
'Piano Dokuenkai 2012' Ustream Document (「ピアノ独演会2012」♪Ustream document)	Released: May 10, 2012; Label: Apart; Formats: DVD	—
Piano Dokuenkai: Natsu no Jin Tsuika Kōen 2012.8.23 @ Seijo Hall (ピアノ独演会-夏の陣-追加公演 2012.8.23@成城ホール)	Released: January 9, 2013; Label: Apart; Formats: DVD	—
