= Ichiyo Izawa =

Japanese pianist, vocalist and songwriter

Ichiyo Izawa 伊澤 一葉
- Born: Keitaro Izawa; July 4, 1976 (age 49); Kurashiki, Okayama, Japan
- Genres: Jazz, rock, pop
- Occupations: Pianist, vocalist, songwriter
- Instruments: Piano, keyboard, guitar, vocals
- Years active: 2003–present
- Label: EMI Music Japan

Keitaro Izawa (伊澤 啓太郎, Izawa Keitarō; born July 4, 1976), better known by his stage name Ichiyo Izawa (伊澤 一葉, Izawa Ichiyō) is a Japanese pianist, vocalist and songwriter, best known for his work in the Ringo Sheena-helmed band Tokyo Jihen. He is also the lead vocalist and pianist of the band Appa.

== Biography ==
Izawa was born in 1976 in Kurashiki City, Okayama Prefecture. His father Masanobu Izawa is the president of Kurabun Corporation.

Izawa began studying piano at the age of four, and by the age of 14 had also learned to play the guitar and was active in several bands in which he also served as the vocalist. After graduating from Kurashiki's Seiryo Senior High School, he entered the composers' program at the Kunitachi College of Music; however, he left the college two years later before graduation because he felt he would not be able to study and compose music seriously at the same time. He formed a band with Kunitachi classmate H Zett M soon after, although they dissolved three months later.

He formed the band Appa in 2004 along with bassist Hideaki Hotta and drummer Kazuto Sato. Izawa serves as the band's leader, pianist and vocalist in addition to writing and arranging most of their songs. After two small-run independent EP releases, Appa released their full-length debut album, Rashipoki, on November 5, 2008.

In mid-2005, Izawa was introduced to Ringo Sheena by H Zett M, then the keyboardist of Sheena's band Tokyo Jihen, as a potential replacement keyboardist (HZM planned to depart the group to concentrate more fully on his own band Pe'z). After a period of hesitation, he was eventually convinced by the encouragement of both Sheena and bassist Seiji Kameda, who is said to have told him "Hurry up and join so we can play together", and Izawa debuted later the same year as a member of Tokyo Jihen's Phase 2 lineup alongside new guitarist Ryosuke Nagaoka, nicknamed Ukigumo. He arranged the majority of the songs on their second album Adult and would go on to compose more songs for the group than any other member besides Sheena.

In 2009, during a period of inactivity for the band during Sheena's temporary return to her solo work with the release of her fourth album Sanmon Gossip, Izawa joined former Ellegarden member Takeshi Hosomi's new band The Hiatus as a touring member.

Izawa remained a member of Tokyo Jihen until the band's farewell tour and breakup in February 2012. He has since resumed full-time membership in Appa, beginning with a performance at March 11 Nakaso Music Festival.

Appa released their second full-length album, Mantra, on August 29, 2012.
