= Pe'z =

Japanese jazz band

PE'Z
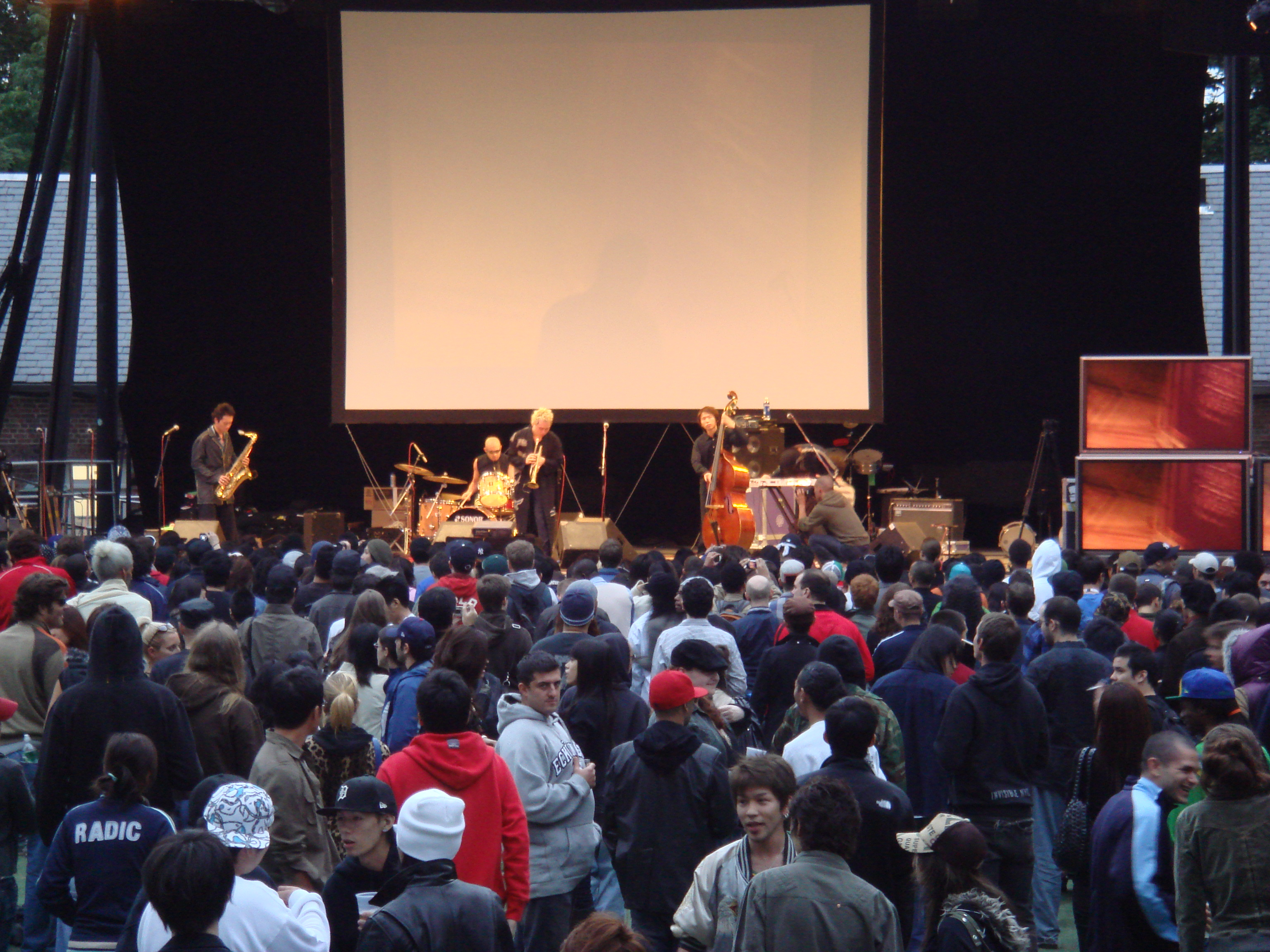

Background information
- Origin: Japan
- Genres: Jazz
- Years active: 2000–2015
- Labels: Sony Music Japan
- Members: Wataru Ohyama; Kouske Kadota; Masahiro Nirehara; Kou; Masayuki Hiizumi

PE'Z (ペズ, Pezu) was a Japanese jazz instrumental band consisting of five men, dubbed "The Samurai Jazz Band." They were signed onto Sony Music Japan from 2008 until their split in 2015.

== History ==
PE'Z began their music careers playing live on the streets of Shibuya in the center of Tokyo during the summer of 2000. Word of mouth spread quickly and they began pulling in large crowds which sometimes totaled up to 600.

In just three years, the band played in ten outdoor music festivals throughout Japan, including Newport Jazz Festival '02 in Madaro, Mt. Fuji Jazz Festival 2002 in Shizuoka, and Rising Sun Rock Festival in Hokkaido. In September 2002 their first full album, Kugatsu no Sola (September Sky) was released, reaching No.10 on the billboard. In March 2003 they received an award for "New Artist Of The Year" at the 17th annual Japan Gold Disc Awards.

In August 2003 they participated in the re-mix of Japanese duo called Chemistry's 8th single "Ashita E Kaeru/Us" ("Return to Tomorrow").

That same year, Masayuki Hiizumi joined Shiina Ringo's backing band as a keyboard player for her nationwide tour. In 2004, he joined Shiina's new band Tokyo Jihen, but eventually left the group to focus his attention back to PE'Z in the next year. He later released a solo album entitled 5+2=11 under the moniker H Zett M.

In October 2005 PE'Z performed at UK's In the City along with fellow Japanese artists DMBQ and The Rodeo Carburettor. The quintet followed that with numerous performances in Europe (including a live show on the street in Amsterdam). The following year, 2006, they participated in both Canadian Music Week (CMW) and South by Southwest (SXSW), as well as giving a live performance in South Korea in between. Their gig at SXSW was subsequently followed with their first-ever US tour as part of Japan Nite, performing in New York City, Cambridge, Philadelphia, Chicago, Denver, Seattle, Portland, San Francisco, and Los Angeles.

In September 2006, PE'Z released a three-track EP with the British soul singer Nate James, featuring an original track, "Live for the Groove," a reworked Nate James track, "Universal," and a cover of "Hard to Handle" by Otis Redding. They subsequently released a 32-track double album entitled Funny Day & Hard Night on March 25, 2007. This was followed by a second Realive DVD, which featured the band playing an outdoor Venue, with two sets which followed the Day/Night themes of the double CD, with the first played roughly at sundown and the second at night, with house and LED lighting.

In 2014 they released a new original album called Chisou, but in December 2014, drummer Kou posted to the band's official webpage that the group would dissolve in the following year. The band went on a final tour of Japan from January to April 2015 as well as appearing in several Japanese music festivals.

== pe'zmoku ==
In 2007, the band collaborated with the alternative folk singer suzumoku, with whom they co-founded pe'zmoku. pe'zmoku performed for the first time during the encore of PE'Z's annual special live "EN-MUSUBI" at the end of the same year.

In 2008, they started in earnest. They recorded the ending theme "Gallop" for the anime series Bleach, and the ending theme "Ano Kaze ni Notte" for Valkyria Chronicles.

Following a brief disappearance by suzumoku, impromptu cancellations of several concerts were forced on the band in March 2009. As of October 2009 the band is on an indefinite hiatus.

== Personnel ==
- Wataru "B.M.W" Ohyama, born in Kanagawa, trumpet
- Kouske "Jaw" Kadota, born in Ehime, saxophone
- Masahiro Nirehara, born in Niigata, double bass
- Kou, born in Tokyo, drums
- Masayuki "HZM" Hiizumi, born in Kobe, keyboard & vocals

== Discography ==
=== Albums ===
- [09.11.2002] Kugatsu no Sola
- [01.29.2003] Realive Tour 2002 (Odoranya Son Son In Tokyo)
- [12.10.2003] KIWAMARI ZUKI
- [12.07.2005] Pe'z Realive 2005 Fushi
- [03.15.2006] Best 1st Stage
- [07.26.2006] Nippon No Jazz - Samurai Spirit
- [03.28.2007] Kite Neru: Funny Day & Hard Night
- [02.27.2008] Samurai Meets The Enemy
- [12.20.2008] PE'Z BEST STAGE -YAMIKUMO-
- [09.24.2010] 銀幕のジャズ -SAMURAI FLYS INTO THE SCREEN-
- [03.16.2011] Samurai Jazz - Compact Disc -
- [04.20.2011] Jazz-SAMURAI KILLS HIMSELF-of Kinema
- [02.14.2012] OH! YEAH! PARTY!!
- [03.06.2013] JumpUP!

=== Mini-Albums ===
- [02.21.2001] pe'z
- [06.21.2001] Hayato
- [10.24.2001] OKOKOROIRE
- [04.11.2002] Akatsuki
- [03.09.2003] Tsu Ku Shi N Bow
- [05.28.2003] Hana Saku Don Bla Go!
- [08.04.2004] Suzumushi
- [11.23.2005] Chitose Dori
- [02.03.2010] 1・2・MAX
- [06.09.2010] I WANT YOU

=== Singles ===
- [07.17.2002] Hale No Sola Sita - La Yellow Samba
- [06.06.2003] DRY! DRY! DRY!
- [11.19.2003] Daichisanshou
- [09.21.2004] AUCTION
- [09.20.2006] Live for the Groove
- [08.19.2010] Uha-Uha / Boushoku-kei Danshi!!
