= Ryosuke Nagaoka =

Ukigumo 浮雲
- Born: Ryosuke Nagaoka; October 7, 1978 (age 47); Chiba, Chiba, Japan
- Genres: Bluegrass; country; rock; pop; soul; new wave
- Occupations: Musician; songwriter
- Instruments: Guitar; vocals; mandolin
- Label: EMI Music Japan
- Website: http://nagaokaryosuke.com

Ryosuke Nagaoka (長岡 亮介, Nagaoka Ryōsuke; born October 7, 1978), is a Japanese musician, and singer and guitarist for the band Petrolz. Under the stage name Ukigumo (浮雲, Ukigumo; 'drifting cloud'), he was the second guitarist for Ringo Sheena's band Tokyo Jihen from 2005 until 2012. In 2013, Nagoka joined the band Gokumontō Ikka, a project involving Queen Bee leader Avu-chan.

== Biography ==
He was born and raised in public housing in Chiba Prefecture. The first instrument he learned during his childhood was the piano, which he started learning at age 9. He was introduced to bluegrass music at an early age, as his father was an amateur bluegrass musician. He started playing the guitar as a junior in high school, and joined a country band. He is an avid motorcycle and French car aficionado.

Nagaoka is an old friend of Ringo Sheena's, and he had played in a band with her elder brother Shiina Junpei, Evil Vibrations. He also participated in the recording of her third solo album, Kalk, Samen, Chestnut Flower, on which he played guitar on the songs "Camouflage" (迷彩, Meisai), "Consciously" (意識, Ishiki) and the vinyl record bonus track "Fig Flower" (映日紅の花, Ichijiku no Hana; which he also arranged and composed), as well as being credited on vacuum cleaner and "vocal percussion" on two more songs. After the departure of Mikio Hirama from Sheena's band Tokyo Jihen in 2005, he became the band's guitarist and background vocalist. Upon joining the band's "Phase 2", he was given the pseudonym Ukigumo by Sheena. With them, he released four albums and a mini-album, and he remained with the band until its 2012 breakup. Ukigumo participated in the band's reunion, releasing a mini-album in 2020 and a full album in 2021. He has penned numerous songs as a member of the band, including the single "OSCA", and was also the lead arranger for the single "Shuraba".

Since 2005, he has also been the guitar player and singer for his own band, Petrolz (ペトロールズ, Petorōruzu), which has released three albums and two mini-albums as of 2024. The band was formed alongside bassist Jungo Miura (三浦 淳悟, Miura Jungo) aka "Jumbo" (who has also played with Shiina in the past), and drummer Toshihide Kawamura (河村 俊秀, Kawamura Toshihide) a.k.a. "Bob". On November 26, 2024, Kawamura was found dead in his home.

Ukigumo's cover of Pizzicato Five's "The Night Is Still Young" (東京は夜の七時, Tōkyō wa Yoru no Shichiji; "Tokyo at 7 in the evening"), with new lyrics by Ringo Sheena and renamed "Tōkyō wa Yoru no Shichiji (Rio wa Asa no Shichiji)" (東京は夜の七時〜リオは朝の七時〜, "Tokyo at 7 in the evening (Rio at 7 in the morning)"), was played during the flag handover portion of the 2016 Summer Paralympics closing ceremony.

== Discography ==
=== With Tokyo Jihen ===
- Kyōiku (2004)
- Adult (2006)
- Variety (2007)
- Sports (2010)
- Dai Hakken (2011)
- Color Bars (2012)
- News (2020)
- Ongaku (2021)

=== With Petrolz ===
==== Studio albums ====
- Renaissance (2015)
- GGKKNRSSSTW (2019)

==== Live albums ====
- Music Found by HDR-HC3 (2008)
- Capture 419 (2012)
- Super Excited (2019)

==== Extended plays ====
- EVE2009 (2008)
- Problems (2012)

==== Singles ====
- Amber (2009)
- Idol (2010)
- Touch Me (2013)
- Side by Side (2014)
- Fuel/ASB (2016)
- Tanoc/Reverb (2019)

=== Solo ===
- Takao Tajima & Ryosuke Nagaoka, Sessions (2018)
