= Sakuran =

Manga series created by Moyoco Anno

- Tankōbon volume cover

さくらん
- Manga
- Written by: Moyoco Anno
- Published by: Kodansha
- English publisher: NA: Vertical Inc
- Magazine: Evening
- Original run: August 20, 2001 – May 27, 2003
- Volumes: 1
- Live-action film
- Directed by: Mika Ninagawa
- Produced by: Fellah Pictures
- Written by: Yuki Tanada
- Music by: Shiina Ringo
- Released: February 24, 2007
- Runtime: 111 minutes
- icon

Sakuran (Japanese: さくらん; lit. 'Derangement'), is a Japanese manga series by Moyoco Anno. It was serialized in Kodansha's seinen manga magazine Evening from August 2001 to May 2003, with its chapters compiled in one volume. The manga is about a girl who goes through different names throughout the story and becomes a tayū, or high ranking oiran (courtesan). North American publisher Vertical Inc published it in English in July 2012.

== Plot ==
A young kamuro (maid in a brothel) is sold into the red-light district of Yoshiwara and is put under the care of the oiran of the Tamagiku house, Shōhi, who names her Tomeki. The girl is very rebellious, leading to the heads of the household considering her potential future as a successful oiran, as a high-ranking courtesan needs not only beauty and talent but also the tenacity to maintain their position in order to be successful.

Tomeki later takes the name O-Rin as a hikkomi (or courtesan-in-training), and later takes the name Kiyoha, and is considered the most beautiful girl in the Tamagiku household. Her popularity threatens the position of the Tamagiku household's other oiran, Mikumo, which creates great tension between the two. Kiyoha's rivalry with Mikumo is not the only challenge she faces, as the appearance of a young man named Sōjirō faces her with the impossibility of finding love in her position.

== Media ==
=== Manga ===
Written and illustrated by Moyoco Anno, Sakuran was serialized in Kodansha's seinen manga magazine Evening from its inaugural issue in August 20, 2001, to May 27, 2003. Its chapters were compiled in one tankōbon volume, released on November 6, 2003.

=== Film ===
A live-action film adaptation was released in Japan on February 24, 2007. The film stars Anna Tsuchiya and marks the directorial debut of photographer Mika Ninagawa. Ringo Sheena's album Heisei Fūzoku acts as the soundtrack.

Sakuran theatrical film poster

==== Cast ====
- Anna Tsuchiya as Kiyoha
- Ayame Koike as Young Kiyoha
- Asuka Saito as Tomeki
- Kippei Shiina as Kuranosuke
- Yoshino Kimura as Takao
- Hiroki Narimiya as Sōjirō
- Miho Kanno as Shōhi
- Ai Yoshikawa as Nihohi
- Masatoshi Nagase as Mitsunobu
- Masanobu Andō as Seiji
- Renji Ishibashi as Owner
- Kyōko Koizumi as Oran
