= Tokyo Jihen =

Japanese rock band

- Also known as: Tokyo Incidents
- Origin: Japan
- Genres: Experimental rock; avant-pop; acid jazz
- Years active: 2003–2012; 2019–present
- Labels: EMI Music Japan; Virgin; EMI
- Members: Ringo Sheena; Seiji Kameda; Toshiki Hata; Ichiyo Izawa; Ukigumo
- Past members: H Zett M Mikio Hirama
- Website: www.tokyojihen.com

Tokyo Jihen (東京事変, Tōkyō Jihen), also known as Tokyo Incidents, is a Japanese rock band formed by Ringo Sheena after leaving her solo career. The band's debut single "Gunjō Biyori" was released in September 2004, and they ended activities in February 2012. The band sold 2.3 million albums, singles, and DVDs. The band reunited and released a new single on January 1, 2020.

== History ==
=== Origins (2003) ===
Tokyo Jihen started as Ringo Sheena's backing band for her last concert tour as she ended the first half of her solo career. Sheena was contemplating working with a band while working on her last solo album, Kalk Samen Kuri no Hana. She began looking for members of her backing band to support her solo tour "Sugoroku Ecstasy" in the Autumn of 2003. The tour band was introduced as Tokyo Jihen for the first time during the tour, featuring guitarist Mikio Hirama, pianist H Zett M, drummer Toshiki Hata, and familiar bassist Seiji Kameda. The musicians she selected became the core of what would become Tokyo Jihen.

After the tour, she announced that she would stop her solo career to join "Tokyo Jihen" as a full-fledged member.

=== "Phase 1" era and its end (2004–2005) ===
On May 31, 2004, the members of the Tokyo Jihen declared that they worked as a permanent band. On July 24, they appeared in the presence of fans at the live 0724 Yamabikari for the first time. They played some live sets during that year's Fuji Rock Festival, and made their major debut with the single "Gunjō Biyori" on September 8. Tokyo Jihen released one album and two singles, and held their first concert tour -Tokyo Jihen live tour 2005 "dynamite!"-.

On July 1, 2005, it was announced during the tour that keyboardist H ZETT M and guitarist Mikio Hirama would leave Tokyo Jihen. H ZETT M returned to his duties as pianist for PE'Z, and Hirama went back to being a solo singer. It was decided that they would withdraw from the band before the "dynamite!" tour started.

After the departure of the band's former guitarist and keyboardist, Sheena began a search for new members. She was going to have at least a keyboard player join because two people left the band at the same time. H ZETT M recommended his friend and former bandmate, Keitaro Izawa, as a substitute for him to Sheena, but she began visiting music clubs to look for other keyboardists. In the end she found no one who was better than Izawa, and Sheena decided to invite him to join. He assumed the stage name of Ichiyo Izawa during his time with the band.

The search for a new guitarist proved more difficult. Sheena approached several guitarists as potential members, but was turned down by all of them, possibly because they disliked the idea of being considered her "backing band". At worst, she planned to choose a different guitarist each time without having a regular guitarist. However, when the other members listened to the first Tokyo Jihen album Kyōiku demos, the situation changed. All of them were pleased with the demo session guitarist and asked Sheena his name. This guitarist was Ryosuke Nagaoka, who assumed the stage name of Ukigumo after joining Tokyo Jihen. Sheena and Ukigumo had been friends since her days as a soloist. He turned down the offer to join Tokyo Jihen at first, but finally accepted just before recording began for Adult.

With so many members replaced, Sheena considered changing the name of the band, but decided against it in the end.

In September 2005, keyboardist Ichiyō Izawa and guitarist Ukigumo formally joined Tokyo Jihen. The lineup including the former members subsequently came to be called Dai-Ikki (第一期, Phase 1), with the current one referred to as Dai-Niki (第二期, Phase 2).

=== Beginning of "Phase 2" (2006–2007) ===
The band's second album "Adult", released on January 25, 2006, went to number one on the Oricon charts, a first for the band. They held two concerts, entitled "DOMESTIC! Virgin LINE", at Nippon Budokan Hall and Osaka-jo Hall in February as the new members debut. A nationwide tour, "DOMESTIC!" Just can't help it followed later the same year.

In the latter half of 2006, Sheena produced the film score of the movie Sakuran, on which three of the other four band members (excluding Hata, who had broken his leg) collaborated.

Following the 2007 release of two singles, "O.S.C.A." and "Killer-tune", and an album, Variety, the first release not containing any compositions by Sheena, they embarked on the concert tour "Tokyo Jihen live tour 2007 Spa & Treatment" to promote the album.

=== Members' activities outside Tokyo Jihen (2008–2009) ===
The music video for "Killer-tune" won the Best Technical Works Video category in the March 15, 2008 Space Shower Music Video Awards 08 by Space Shower TV.

As 2008 marked the 10th anniversary of Sheena's professional debut, she resumed solo activities as "Ringo Sheena" for the first time since the formation of Tokyo Jihen. She participated in the summer Rising Sun Rock Festival both as a soloist and as a member of Tokyo Jihen. The activity of Tokyo Jihen was thus restricted during this period.

In 2009, Sheena continued her solo activity from the previous year with the release of a new solo album, her first since 2003's Kalk Samen Kuri no Hana, in June. During the same period, Ukigumo and Izawa resumed activities with their respective bands. Kameda returned to his work as a producer, overseeing several top ten releases, and Hata participated in the recording and subsequent tour for Fujifabric's new album. Sheena, Ukigumo, and Izawa were all involved in the production of Rie Tomosaka's album Toridori the same year. Ukigumo and Izawa joined Tomosaka's promotional tour as part of her backing band.

On May 25, 2009, it was announced that Izawa had joined "The Hiatus", a new band formed by former Ellegarden member Takeshi Hosomi. They defined The Hiatus as "a project of music, arts, and depicters" on the band's official site. Izawa was listed as a tour member on the site, and took part in their "Trash We'd Love Tour 2009". Izawa also held some concerts with Hosomi as "Hosomi Ichiyō" (細美一葉) from October to December.

On December 2, 2009, Tokyo Jihen released the single "Nōdōteki Sanpunkan", their first in two years, and resumed their activity as a band full-time. They appeared as part of the lineup of the December 30, 2009 Countdown Japan 09/10.

=== Final years and dissolution (2010–2012) ===
The fourth album Sports, released on February 24, 2010, won the 1st place in Oricon chart after an interval of four years. The nationwide tour "Tokyo Incident live tour 2010 UltraC" started in March.

The fifth album Dai Hakken was released on June 29, 2011, and the nationwide tour "Tokyo Incident live tour 2011 Discovery" started in September 30.

On January 11, 2012, Ringo Sheena announced their break up on their official site. Their last original release, a mini-album entitled Color Bars, was released on January 18, 2012. A live best of album, Tokyo Collection, and a concert DVD and Blu-ray release of their "Discovery Tour" went on sale on February 15. Tokyo Jihen's embarked on a final tour, entitled "Domestique Bon Voyage", which included Yokohama Arena (February 14–15), Osaka-jo Hall (February 21–22), and Tokyo's Nippon Budokan (February 28–29).

The band officially dissolved on February 29, 2012, after their sold-out final Budokan concert. On June 15, an announcement on Sheena's official site, Kronekodow, revealed that Tokyo Jihen would release one final album, Shin'ya Waku (The Edge of Late Night), and DVD/Blu-ray video, Chin Play Kou Play (Strange Plays and Great Plays) in August of that year. The album, a collection of B-sides, included the previously unreleased-on-CD "Handsome Sugite" and one new song, "Tadanaranu Kankei". The video contained highlights from the band's best live performances along with festival appearances and rare material.

=== After dissolution ===
On December 31, 2016, when Ringo Sheena participated in the 67th NHK Kōhaku Uta Gassen, Tokyo Jihen played as her backing band. However, the band's name was not written in the credits. Ukigumo and H Zett M have been regular collaborators with Sheena, playing on recorded work and in backing bands on her live tours.

=== Reunion ===
On January 1, 2020, Tokyo Jihen released a surprise digital single, "Erabarezaru Kokumin", and announced a tour of Japan titled "Live Tour 2020 News Flash", beginning February 29. In February, the band announced their 5-song EP News would be released on April 8, 2020. The band released the single "Blue Period" (青のID) as the theme song of the 2020 film Sakura, stating that the song encapulates "the limbo between childhood and adulthood, shedding our immature sweat and tears". Their sixth studio album Ongaku (音楽, Music) was released on June 9, 2021.

== Members ==
=== Current members ===
- Ringo Sheena (椎名 林檎, Shiina Ringo) – lead vocals, guitars, keyboards, piano, melodica, kazoo (2003–2012; 2019–present)
- Seiji Kameda (亀田 誠治, Kameda Seiji) – bass guitar, upright bass (2003–2012; 2019–present)
- Toshiki Hata (刄田 綴色, Hata Toshiki) – drums, percussion (2003–2012; 2019–present)
- Ukigumo (浮雲, The Drifting Cloud) – guitars, backing vocals, rap (2005–2012; 2019–present)
- Ichiyō Izawa (伊澤 一葉, Izawa Ichiyō) – keyboards, guitars, piano, backing vocals (2005–2012; 2019–present)

=== Former members ===
- H Zett M (H是都M, H ZETT M) – keyboards, piano, backing vocals (2003–2005)
- Mikio Hirama (ヒラマ ミキオ (晝海 幹音), Hirama Mikio) – guitars, backing vocals (2003–2005)

=== Producers ===
Uni Inoue (井上 雨迩, Inoue Uni)

- Main occupation: Audio engineer

Inoue has produced all of Ringo Sheena's works since her second album. Sheena calls him "the sixth member".

=== Naming of members ===
The real names of Hirama and Hata are "平間 幹央" and "畑 利樹" respectively, but, Ringo Sheena gave them stage names, using Kanji which is not usually used for their names, but as they are the phonetic equivalent, the pronunciation is not changed. Since Ryosuke Nagaoka always drifted unsteadily and nobody knew where he would go, Sheena named Nagaoka "Ukigumo" which means the drifting cloud. Sheena planned to give Keitaro Izawa a stage name, but he refused and chose one for himself, Ichiyō Izawa.

== Songwriting ==
The band members have different writing styles. Ringo Sheena and Ichiyo Izawa write their songs using musical notation. Seiji Kameda uses different methods, recording himself humming, using musical instruments, or using a computer. Ukigumo, on the other hand, cannot write musical notation, Izawa or (less frequently) Sheena transcribe his tunes in the studio. Since Ukigumo writes music without considering a song, it is hard for Sheena to put the words to his music, so he often writes the lyrics to his own songs. Finally, Toshiki Hata stubbornly refused to write music, even declining to write lyrics when Sheena asked him to. He finally did contribute one song to the band's last EP before their split, Color Bars, and the first EP since their reunion, News.

== Concerts and tours ==
Tours

- Dynamite! (2005)
- Domestic! Virgin Line (2006)
- Domestic! Just Can't Help It (2006)
- Spa & Treatment (2007)
- Ultra C (2010)
- Discovery (2011)
- Domestique Bon Voyage (2012)
- News Flash (2020)

Notable concerts and appearances

- Sugoroku Ecstasy (2003)
- Fuji Rock Festival (2004)
- Sunset Live (2004)
- Dai Ikkai Ringohan Taikai Adaruto Onrī (2005)
- Society of the Citizens Vol. 1 (2006)
- Countdown Japan 06/07 (2006)
- Rising Sun Rock Festival (2008)
- Society of the Citizens Vol. 2 (2008)
- Countdown Japan 09/10 (2009)
- EMI Rocks (2010 and 2012)
- TV Asahi Dream Festival (2011)

== Discography ==
- Kyōiku (2004)
- Adult (2006)
- Variety (2007)
- Sports (2010)
- Dai Hakken (2011)
- Music (2021)
