= Tokyo Jihen discography =

- Studio albums: 6
- EPs: 5
- Live albums: 1
- Compilation albums: 2
- Singles: 13
- B-sides: 11
- Video albums: 13
- Music videos: 24

The discography of Tokyo Jihen consists of five studio albums, three compilation albums, one regular release extended play, three vinyl exclusive extended plays, and 13 video releases, released through Toshiba EMI, EMI Music Japan and Universal between 2004 and 2013.

== Albums ==
=== Studio albums ===
List of albums, with selected chart positions
Title	Album details	Peak positions					Sales	Certifications
Title	Album details	JPN	KOR (Note: The Gaon Albums Chart was established in 2010.)	KOR Overseas (Note: Week references for Gaon: Sports, Dai Hakken,Color Bars, Tokyo Collection, Shin'ya Waku.)	TWN	TWN East Asian	Sales	Certifications
Kyōiku	Released: November 25, 2004; Label: Virgin Music; Formats: CD, digital download	2	—	—	—	—	391,000	RIAJ: Platinum
Adult	Released: January 26, 2006; Label: Virgin Music; Formats: CD, CD+DVD, digital download	1	—	—	—	3	294,000	RIAJ: Platinum
Variety	Released: September 26, 2007; Label: Virgin Music; Formats: CD, digital download	2	—	—	18	2	175,000	RIAJ: Gold
Sports	Released: February 24, 2010; Label: Virgin Music; Formats: CD, digital download	1	15	4	—	9	177,000	RIAJ: Gold
Dai Hakken	Released: June 29, 2011; Label: Virgin Music; Formats: CD, digital download	1	30	7	—	10	140,000	RIAJ: Gold
Music	Released: June 9, 2021; Label: EMI; Formats: CD, digital download	2	—	—	—	—		
"—" denotes a recording that did not chart or was not released in that territory.

=== Compilation albums ===
List of albums, with selected chart positions
Title	Album details	Peak positions			Sales
Title	Album details	JPN	KOR Overseas	TWN East Asian	Sales
Tokyo Collection	Live recording greatest hits album; Released: February 15, 2012; Label: Virgin Music; Formats: CD, digital download	1	43	4	62,000
Shin'ya Waku	B-side and rarities; Released: August 29, 2012; Label: Virgin Music; Formats: CD, digital download	3	39	11	52,000
Sogo	Greatest hits; Released: December 22, 2021; Label: Universal; Formats: CD, digital download	3	—	—	34,515

=== Box set ===
List of box sets, with selected chart positions
Title	Album details	Peak positions	Sales
Title	Album details	JPN	Sales
Hard Disk	Contains: Kyōiku, Adult, Variety, Sports, Dai Hakken, Color Bars, Shin'ya Waku, Recovery Disc and The Key to Memory; Released: February 27, 2013; Label: Virgin Music; Formats: 8-CD+USB	15	12,000

== Extended plays ==
List of EPs, with selected chart positions
Title	EP details	Peak positions				Sales	Certifications
Title	EP details	JPN	KOR	KOR Overseas	TWN East Asian	Sales	Certifications
Gunjō Biyori / Sōnan	Released: November 25, 2004; Label: Virgin Music; Formats: Vinyl	108	—	—	—	2,300	
Adult Video Original Sound Track	Released: March 23, 2006; Label: Virgin Music; Formats: Vinyl, digital download	221	—	—	—	1,100	
Variety Zōkangō (娯楽（バラエティ）増刊号)	Released: November 21, 2007; Label: Virgin Music; Formats: Vinyl	281	—	—	—	700	
Color Bars	Released: January 18, 2012; Label: Virgin Music; Formats: CD, digital download	2	42	3	6	109,000	RIAJ: Gold
News	Released: April 8, 2020; Label: EMI; Formats: CD, digital download	2	—	—	3	30,407	
"—" denotes a recording that did not chart or was not released in that territory.

== Singles ==
List of singles, with selected chart positions
Title	Year	Peak chart positions			Sales	Certifications	Album
Title	Year	JPN Oricon	JPN Hot 100 (Note: The Japan Hot 100 was established in February 2008.)	TWN East Asian (Note: "Nōdōteki Sanpunkan" position was taken from 2008 week49.)	Sales	Certifications	Album
"Gunjō Biyori"	2004	2	45	—	203,000	RIAJ (physical): Gold; RIAJ (download): Gold; RIAJ (streaming): Gold	Kyōiku
"Sōnan"	2004	2	—	—	123,000	RIAJ (physical): Gold	Kyōiku
"Shuraba"	2005	5	—	—	110,000	RIAJ (cellphone): Gold; RIAJ (PC): Gold; RIAJ (physical): Gold	Adult
"OSCA"	2007	2	—	—	58,000		Variety
"Killer-tune"	2007	5	—	—	51,000		Variety
"Senkō Shōjo"	2007	—	—	—	—	RIAJ (cellphone): Gold; RIAJ (PC): Gold	Sports
"Nōdōteki Sanpunkan"	2009	1	1	16	71,000	RIAJ (cellphone): Gold; RIAJ (PC): Gold	Sports
"Tengoku e Yōkoso"	2010	—	—	—	—		Dai Hakken
"Dopa-Mint!"	2010	—	36	—	—		Dai Hakken
"Sora ga Natteiru"	2011	6	11	—	54,000		Dai Hakken
"Onna no Ko wa Dare Demo"	2011	6	5	—	54,000		Dai Hakken
"Erabarezaru Kokumin"	2020	—	—	—	—		News
"—" denotes a recording that did not chart or was not released in that territory.

=== Promotional singles ===
Title	Year	Peak chart positions	Album
Title	Year	JPN Hot 100	Album
"Omatsuri Sawagi" (御祭騒ぎ; "The Merrymaking")	2004	—	Kyōiku
"Black Out" (ブラックアウト, Burakku Auto)	2006	—	Adult
"Kenka Jōtō" (喧嘩上等; "Active Fighting")	2006	—	Adult
"Shōjo Robot"	2006	—	Just Can't Help It.
"Kachi Ikusa"	2010	30	Sports
"Denpa Tsūshin" (電波通信; "Electro-communication")	2010	—	Sports
"Season Sayonara"	2010	13	Sports
"Sweet Spot"	2010	—	Sports
"Atarashii Bunmei Kaika"	2011	8	Dai Hakken
"Nijūisseiki Uchū no Ko" (21世紀宇宙の子; "Child of the 21st Century Universe")	2011	—	Dai Hakken
"Handsome Sugite" (ハンサム過ぎて; "Too Handsome")	2011	14	CS Channel
"Kon'ya wa Karasawagi"	2012	4	Color Bars
"Tadanaranu Kankei" (ただならぬ関係; "Incomparable Relationship")	2012	6	Shin'ya Waku
"Bon Voyage"	2013	—	Hard Disk
"—" denotes a recording that did not chart.

== Other appearances ==
The following songs are appearances by Tokyo Jihen for other musicians, as instrument performers and song arrangers.

Title	Year	Album
"Amagasa" (Tokio)	2008	17
"Kachū no Otoko" (渦中の男; "Vortex Boy") (Tokio)	2008	"Amagasa" (single)
"Hiyori Hime" (Puffy)	2009	Bring It!
"Shuen no Onna" (主演の女; "Leading Lady") (Puffy)	2009	Bring It!
"Tokai no Manner" (都会のマナー; "City Manners") (Rie Tomosaka)	2009	Toridori.
"Oishii Kisetsu" (Chiaki Kuriyama)	2011	Circus
"Ketteiteki Sanpunkan" (Chiaki Kuriyama)	2011	Circus
"Carnation" (Ringo Sheena)	2011	"Carnation" (single)
"Watashi no Aisuru Hito" (私の愛するひと; "My Love") (Ringo Sheena)	2011	"Carnation" (single)
"Jinsei wa Omoidōri" (人生は思い通り; "Life Is How I Like It") (Ringo Sheena)	2011	"Carnation" (single)
"Tsukiyo no Shōzō" (Chiaki Kuriyama)	2011	Circus Deluxe Edition
"Seishun no Matataki" (Chiaki Kuriyama)	2011	Circus Deluxe Edition

== Video releases ==
=== Music video collections ===
List of media, with selected chart positions
Title	Album details	Peak positions JPN
Tokyo Incidents Vol .1	Released: December 8, 2004; Label: Virgin Music; Formats: DVD, digital download	5
Adult Video	Released: March 23, 2005; Label: Virgin Music; Formats: DVD, digital download	4
Senkō Shōjo	Released: November 21, 2007; Label: Virgin Music; Formats: DVD, digital download	6
CS Channel	Released: September 21, 2011; Label: Virgin Music; Formats: DVD, Blu-ray, digital download	4
Golden Time	Released: January 27, 2013; Label: Virgin Music; Formats: DVD, Blu-ray, digital download	11

=== Live concerts ===
List of media, with selected chart positions
Title	Album details	Peak positions JPN
Dynamite In	Live concert documentary; Released: July 13, 2005; Label: Toshiba EMI; Formats: DVD, digital download	2
Dynamite Out	Released: August 17, 2005; Label: Toshiba EMI; Formats: DVD, digital download	2
Just Can't Help It.	Released: September 6, 2006; Label: Virgin; Formats: DVD, digital download	2
Spa & Treatment	Released: March 26, 2010; Label: Kronekodow/Virgin; Formats: DVD, digital download	3
Ultra C	Released: August 25, 2010; Label: Virgin; Formats: DVD, Blu-ray, digital download	17
Discovery	Released: February 15, 2012; Label: Virgin; Formats: DVD, Blu-ray, digital download	1
Bon Voyage	Released: June 13, 2012; Label: Virgin; Formats: DVD, Blu-ray, digital download	3
Chin Play Kō Play (珍プレー好プレー; "Bloopers and Highlights")	Live concert compilation video; Released: August 29, 2012; Label: Virgin; Formats: DVD, Blu-ray, digital download	1

== Music videos ==
Year	Music video	Director
2004	"Gunjō Biyori"	Masaaki Uchino
2004	"Sono Onna Fushidara ni Tsuki" (その淑女ふしだらにつき; "The Lady Is a Tramp")	Masaaki Uchino
2004	"Sōnan"	Masaaki Uchino
2004	"Dynamite" (ダイナマイト, Dainamaito)	Masaaki Uchino
2004	"Kurumaya-san" (車屋さん; "Taxi Driver")	Masaaki Uchino
2004	"Service" (サービス, Sābisu)	Masaaki Uchino
2005	"Shuraba"	Shuichi Banba
2006	"Kenka Jōtō"	Hiroshi Usui
2006	"The Kabuki" (歌舞伎)	Hiroshi Usui
2006	"Himitsu for DJ" (秘密; "A Secret")	Hiroshi Usui
2006	"Koi wa Maboroshi" (恋は幻; "Get It Up for Love")	Hiroshi Usui
2006	"Tasogare Naki for Mother" (黄昏泣き; "Don't Cry My Child")	Hiroshi Usui
2007	"OSCA"	Yuichi Kodama
2007	"Killer-tune"	Yuichi Kodama
2007	"Senkō Shōjo"	Yuichi Kodama
2009	"Nōdōteki Sanpunkan"	Yuichi Kodama
2009	"Kachi Ikusa"	Yuichi Kodama
2011	"Sora ga Natteiru"	Yuichi Kodama
2011	"Onna no Ko wa Dare Demo"	Yuichi Kodama
2011	"Atarashii Bunmeikaika"	Yuichi Kodama
2011	"Tengoku e Yōkoso" (Tokyo Bay Ver. CS Edit)	Yuichi Kodama
2011	"Handsome Sugite"	Yuichi Kodama
2012	"Kon'ya wa Karasawagi"	Yuichi Kodama
2012	"Tada Naranu Kankei"	Yuichi Kodama
2020	"Eien no Fuzai Shoumei"	Yuichi Kodama
2020	"Aka no Doumei"	Hiroshi Usui
2021	"Ryokushu"	Yuichi Kodama
2021	"Teaser (Music)"	Yuichi Kodama
2021	"Futsu Dake Toho"	Yuichi Kodama
