= List of songs recorded by Tokyo Jihen =

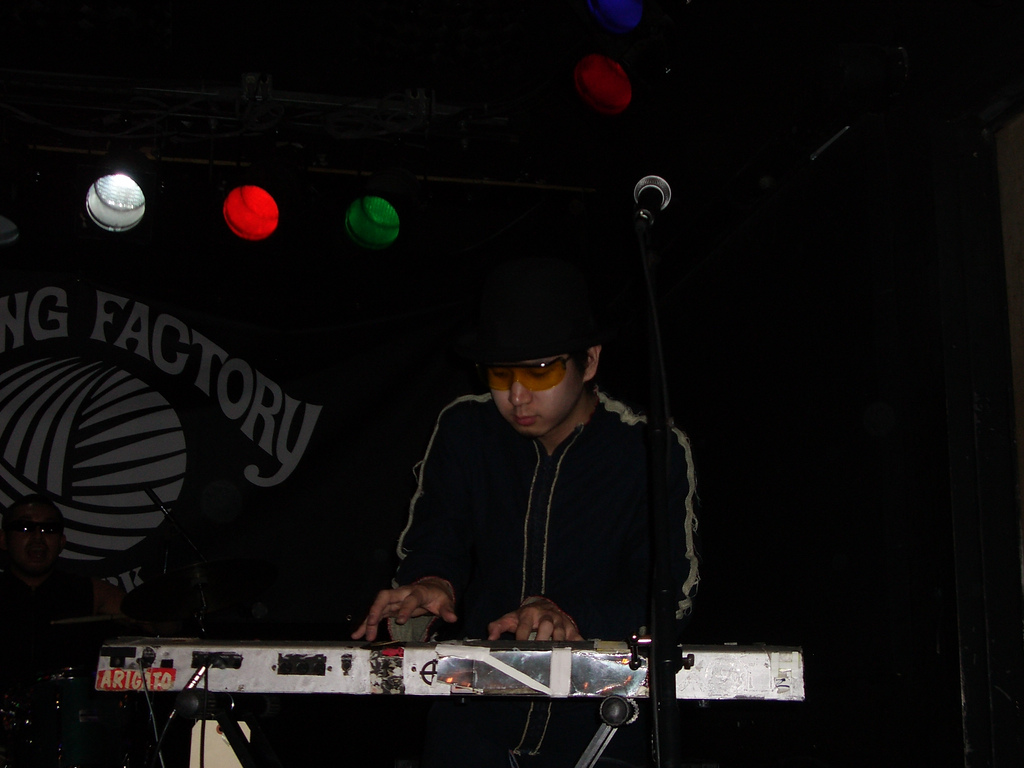
Masayuki Hiizumi, member of Tokyo Jihen from 2004 to 2005, wrote the songs "Gunjō Biyori," "Genjitsu ni Oite" and "Service" on Kyōiku (2004).

Japanese band Tokyo Jihen (2004–2012) recorded material for five studio albums and one extended play, including songs for several compilation albums and singles. The band formed after Japanese singer-songwriter Ringo Sheena formed a band in 2004, but first collaborated with the members in 2003, performing with her on her Sugoroku Ecstasy tour. The original line-up included bassist and producer Seiji Kameda, drummer Toshiki Hata, Jazz band Pe'z pianist Masayuki Hiizumi and guitarist Mikio Hirama.

After the band's debut album Kyōiku (2004), Hiizumi and Hirama left the band's line-up, and in 2005 were replaced by Appa pianist Ichiyo Izawa and guitarist Ukigumo, previous Sheena collaborator and member of the band Petrolz. This line-up remained consistent until Tokyo Jihen's break-up in 2012.

While Sheena acted as the primary songwriter, the band performed songs written by all the band members. Variety (2007) was an album that primarily featured songs composed by Izawa and Ukigumo, and Color Bars (2012) featured five songs, one written by each band member.

The band covered several Ringo Sheena songs, most notably "Ringo no Uta" on Kyōiku (2004), and "Marunouchi Sadistic," which was the most performed song by Tokyo Jihen at concerts, including their own compositions.

This list features every song Tokyo Jihen has performed as a unit that has been released either on CD, as a digital download or on a live concert DVD. Titles were given Japanese song titles, as well as a title in English or French. Titles listed on the left are literal translations of the songs' Japanese titles.

== Songs ==
Key
†	Indicates single release
‡	Indicates song performed in concert and released on DVD, but not recorded in studio
#	Indicates promotional single release

Song name	Official European title	Writer(s)	Originating album(s)	Year	Ref.
"Ariamaru Tomi" (ありあまる富; "Excessive Wealth") (Note: Originally a single by Ringo Sheena, released in 2009.) ‡	"The Invaluable"	Ringo Sheena, Tomotaka Imamichi	Ultra C	2010	
"Atarashii Bunmei Kaika" (新しい文明開化; "New Cultural Revolution") #	"Brand New Civilization"	Ringo Sheena, Ichiyo Izawa	Dai Hakken	2011	
"BB.Queen"	"BB.Queen"	Ukigumo	"Killer-tune" (single)	2007	
"Black Out" (ブラックアウト, Burakkuauto)	"Black Out"	Ringo Sheena	Adult	2006	
"Bokoku Jōcho" (母国情緒; "Homely Atmosphere")	"Feelings for My Motherland"	Ringo Sheena	Kyōiku	2004	
"Bonus Stage (Ice Climbers Yori)" (ボーナスステージ（アイスクライマーより）, Bōnasu Sutēji (Aisukuraimā Yori); "Bonus Stage (from Ice Climber)") ‡	"Bonus Stage (Ice Climber)"	Akito Nakatsuka	Bon Voyage	2012	
"Bon Voyage" #	"Bon Voyage"	Ukigumo	Hard Disk	2013	
"Bōtōmin" (某都民; "Certain Unnamed Citizens")	"The Citizens"	Ringo Sheena, Ukigumo	Variety	2007	
"Carnation" (カーネーション, Kānēshon) (Note: Originally a single by Ringo Sheena, released in 2011.) ‡	"L' œillet"	Ringo Sheena	Discovery	2012	
"C'm'on Let's Go!" ‡	"C'm'on Let's Go!"	Tomotaka Imamichi	Just Can't Help It.	2005	
"Crawl" (クロール, Kurōru)	"Crawl"	Ringo Sheena	Kyōiku	2004	
"Denki no Nai Toshi" (電気のない都市; "City Without Electricity")	"City Without Electricity"	Ringo Sheena, Ichiyo Izawa	Dai Hakken	2011	
"Denpa Tsūshin" (電波通信; "Electro-communication")	"Put Your Antenna Up"	Ringo Sheena, Ichiyo Izawa	Sports	2010	
"Dopa-mint!" (ドーパミント!, Dōpaminto!) †	"Dopa-Mint!"	Ringo Sheena, Ichiyo Izawa	Dai Hakken	2010	
"Dynamite" (ダイナマイト, Dainamaito)	"Dynamite"	Tom Glazer, Mort Garson	"Sōnan" (single)	2004	
"Ekimae" (駅前; "In Front of the Station")	"A Station"	Ringo Sheena	Kyōiku	2004	
"Fair"	"Fair"	Ukigumo	Sports	2010	
"Foul"	"Foul"	Ukigumo	Sports	2010	
"Fukushū" (復讐; "Vengeance")	"Vengeance"	Ukigumo, Ringo Sheena, Robbie Clark	Variety	2007	
"Gaman" (我慢; "Endure")	"Frustration"	Ichiyo Izawa, Ringo Sheena	"Nōdōteki Sanpunkan" (single)	2009	
"Genjitsu ni Oite" (現実に於て; "In Reality")	"Back to Earth"	Masayuki Hiizumi	Kyōiku	2004	
"Genjitsu o Warau" (現実を嗤う; "Laugh at Reality")	"Laugh at Facts"	Ringo Sheena	Kyōiku	2004	
"Gunjō Biyori" (群青日和; "Ultramarine Weather") †	"Ideal Days for Ultramarine"	Masayuki Hiizumi, Ringo Sheena	Kyōiku	2004	
"Himitsu" (秘密; "A Secret") (Note: First performed at the Dynamite tour (2005), live version released on the DVD for Adult.)	"A Secret"	Ringo Sheena	Adult	2006	
"Honnō" (本能; "Instinct") (Note: Originally a single by Ringo Sheena in 1999, from Shōso Strip.) ‡	"Instinct"	Ringo Sheena	Just Can't Help It.	2005	
"Honto no Tokoro" (ほんとのところ; "Actually")	"Honto no Tokoro"	Toshiki Hata	Color Bars	2012	
"Ice Cream no Uta" (アイスクリームの歌; "Ice Cream Song") ‡	"Ice Cream"	Yoshimi Satō, Kōichi Hattori	Bon Voyage	2012	
"If You Can Touch It" (Note: A cover of Mikio Hirama's "Gozen Hachi-ji Jūnana-fun If You Can Touch It" (午前8時17分; "8:17 AM") from his album Yume to Negoto (2001).) ‡	"If You Can Touch It"	Mikio Hirama	Dynamite Out	2005	
"Ikiru" (生きる; "To Live")	"Vivre"	Ringo Sheena, Ichiyo Izawa	Sports	2010	
"Jusui Negai" (入水願い; "Drowning Wish")	"The Suicide"	Ringo Sheena	Kyōiku	2004	
"Kaban no Nakami" (鞄の中身; "Bag Contents")	"Crosswalk"	Ichiyo Izawa, Ringo Sheena, Robbie Clark	"OSCA" (single)	2007	
"Kabuki" (歌舞伎)	"The Kabuki"	Ringo Sheena	Adult	2006	
"Kachi Ikusa" (勝ち戦; "Victory") #	"Win Every Fight"	Ringo Sheena	Sports	2010	
"Kai Horror Dust" (怪ホラーダスト, Kai Horā Dasuto; "Mystery Wonder Dust")	"Kai Horror Dust"	Ichiyo Izawa	Color Bars	2012	
"Kao" (顔; "Faces")	"Faces"	Ringo Sheena, Mikio Hiirama	"Gunjō Biyori" (single)	2004	
"Karada" (体; "Body")	"Physical"	Ichiyo Izawa, Ringo Sheena, Robbie Clark	"Killer-tune" (single)	2007	
"Karisome Otome" (カリソメ乙女; "Temporary Virgin") (Note: Originally a single by Ringo Sheena, released in 2006.) ‡	"Temporary Virgin"	Ringo Sheena	Discovery	2010	
"Kaitei ni Sukū Otoko" (海底に巣くう男; "The Man Who Lives at the Bottom of the Ocean")	"Regardez Moi"	Ukigumo	Dai Hakken	2011	
"Katsute wa Otoko to Onna" (かつては男と女; "Formerly Man and Woman")	"Un Homme Et Une Femme"	Ringo Sheena, Ukigumo	Dai Hakken	2011	
"Kaze ni Ayakatte Ike" (風に肖って行け; "Go Share the Same Luck as the Wind")	"Go with the Wind"	Ringo Sheena, Ichiyo Izawa	Dai Hakken	2011	
"Kenka Jōtō" (喧嘩上等; "Superior Fighting") #	"Active Fighting"	Ringo Sheena	Adult	2006	
"Keshō Naoshi" (化粧直し; "Touch Up Make-Up")	"Powder Up My Mind"	Ringo Sheena	Adult	2006	
"Killer-tune" (キラーチューン, Kirāchūn) †	"Killer-Tune"	Ringo Sheena, Ichiyo Izawa	Variety	2007	
"Kimaru" (極まる; "Extremely")	"Adieu"	Ukigumo	Sports	2010	
"Kingyo no Hako" (金魚の箱; "Box of Goldfish")	"Box of Goldfish"	Ichiyo Izawa	Variety	2007	
"Kinjirareta Asobi" (禁じられた遊び; "Forbidden Games")	"Jeux Interdits"	Ringo Sheena, Ichiyo Izawa	Dai Hakken	2011	
"Koi no Urikomi" (恋の売り込み; "Love Sales Pitch") ‡	"I'm Gonna Knock on Your Door"	Aaron Schroeder, Sid Wayne	Dynamite Out	2005	
"Koi wa Maboroshi" (恋は幻; "Love Is a Phantom")	"Get It Up for Love"	Ned Doheny	"Shuraba" (single)	2005	
"Koko de Kiss Shite." (ここでキスして。; "Kiss Me Here") (Note: Originally a single by Ringo Sheena, from Muzai Moratorium (1999).) ‡	"Kiss Me"	Ringo Sheena	Dynamite Out	2005	
"Kokoro" (心; "Mind")	"Spiritual"	Ringo Sheena	"Sōnan" (single)	2004	
"Kon'ya wa Karasawagi" (今夜はから騒ぎ; "Tonight Is Much Ado About Nothing") (Note: First performed at the Discovery tour in 2011, however the studio version was released before the DVD.) #	"Beaucoup de Bruit pour Rien"	Ringo Sheena	Color Bars	2012	
"Kronekodow" (黒猫道, Kuronekodō; "Way of the Black Cat")	"My Way"	Ringo Sheena, Ichiyo Izawa	Variety	2007	
"Kurumaya-san" (車屋さん; "Taxi Driver")	"Taxi Driver"	Masao Yoneyama	Tokyo Incidents Vol. 1	2004	
"Kyogen-shō" (虚言症; "Addicted to Lying") (Note: Originally a song by Ringo Sheena from Shōso Strip (2000).) ‡	"I Am a Liar"	Ringo Sheena	Chin Play Kō Play	2012	
"Marunouchi Sadistic" (丸の内サディスティック, Marunouchi Sadisutikku) (Note: Originally a song by Ringo Sheena, from her album Muzai Moratorium (2000).) ‡	"Marunouchi Sadistic"	Ringo Sheena	Dynamite Out	2005	
"Metro" (メトロ, Metoro)	"Metro"	Ukigumo	Variety	2007	
"Mirror-ball" (ミラーボール, Mirābōru) (Note: Petrolz cover, first performed at the Domestic! Just Can't Help It. tour (2006), live version released on the DVD for Just Can't Help It. (2006).)	"Mirror-ball"	Ukigumo	Variety	2007	
"Nijūisseiki Uchū no Ko" (21世紀宇宙の子; "Child of the 21st Century Universe") #	"Child of the 21st Century Universe"	Ringo Sheena, Seiji Kameda, Ichiyo Izawa	Dai Hakken	2011	
"Nōdōteki Sanpunkan" (能動的三分間; "Active Three Minutes") †	"3 Min."	Ringo Sheena	Sports	2009	
"Noriki" (乗り気; "Enthusiasm")	"Ride Every Wave"	Ringo Sheena, Ichiyo Izawa	Sports	2010	
"Oiran" (花魁; "Courtesan") (Note: A song by Ringo Sheena x Neko Saito, from Heisei Fūzoku (2007). First performed at Countdown Japan 06/07 on December 31, 2006 before the album's release.) ‡	"Courtesan"	Ukigumo, Ringo Sheena	Chin Play Kō Play	2012	
"Oishii Kisetsu" (おいしい季節; "The Tasty Season") (Note: Originally a single by Chiaki Kuriyama in 2011 that was written by Ringo Sheena.) ‡	"The Creamy Season"	Ringo Sheena	Bon Voyage	2012	
"Omatsuri Sawagi" (御祭騒ぎ; "Festival Bustle") #	"The Carnival"	Ringo Sheena	Kyōiku	2004	
"Onaji Yoru" (同じ夜; "Ordinary Night") (Note: Originally a song by Ringo Sheena, released in 1999.) ‡	"Temporary Virgin"	Ringo Sheena	Dynamite Out	2005	
"Onna no Ko wa Dare Demo" (女の子は誰でも; "All Girls") †	"Fly Me to Heaven"	Ringo Sheena	Dai Hakken	2011	
"OSCA" (Note: Originally a song performed by Ukigumo's band Petrolz (2007).) †	"O.S.C.A."	Ukigumo	Variety	2007	
"Osoru Beki Otonatachi" (恐るべき大人達; "The Terrible Adults")	"Les Adultes Terribles"	Ringo Sheena, Seiji Kameda	Dai Hakken	2011	
"Pinocchio" (ピノキオ, Pinokio)	"Pinocchio"	Ichiyo Izawa	"OSCA" (single)	2007	
"Rakujitsu" (落日; "Dusk")	"Dusk"	Ringo Sheena	"Shuraba" (single)	2005	
"Ramp" (ランプ, Ranpu)	"Ramp"	Ringo Sheena, Ukigumo	Variety	2007	
"Ringo no Uta" (林檎の唄; "A Song of Apples") (Note: Originally released as a single in 2003 by Ringo Sheena, with a differently written title, りんごのうた.)	"A Song of Apples"	Ringo Sheena	Kyōiku	2004	
"Sa_i_ta" ("Bloomed")	"Sa_i_ta"	Ukigumo	Color Bars	2012	
"Sake to Geko" (酒と下戸; "Sake & Nondrinker")	"Sake & Nondrinker"	Ringo Sheena, Ichiyo Izawa	Variety	2007	
"Sanjūni-sai no Wakare" (三十二歳の別れ; "A Separation at 32") ‡	"A Separation"	Ringo Sheena	Tokyo Collection	2012	
"Season Sayonara" (シーズンサヨナラ, Shīzun Sayonara; "Final Game") #	"Season Sayonara"	Ukigumo	Sports	2010	
"Seishun no Mabataki" (青春の瞬き; "Flickers of Youth") (Note: Originally a song by Chiaki Kuriyama in 2011 that was written by Ringo Sheena.) ‡	"Le moment"	Ringo Sheena	Bon Voyage	2012	
"Senkō Shōjo" (閃光少女; "Flash Girl") (Note: First performed at the Spa & Treatment tour (2007) before its release as a digital single, inclusion on the vinyl Variety Zōkangō and the DVD Senkō Shōjo. An English version was also recorded, with the title "Put Your Camera Down.") †	"Put Your Camera Down"	Ringo Sheena, Seiji Kameda	Variety Zōkangō	2007	
"Service" (サービス, Sābisu)	"Service"	Ringo Sheena, Masayuki Hiizumi	Kyōiku	2004	
"Shiseikatsu" (私生活; "Private Life")	"Backstage"	Ringo Sheena, Seiji Kameda	Variety	2007	
"Shōjo Robot" (少女ロボット; "Girl Robot") (Note: Originally a single by Rie Tomosaka in 2000 that was written by Ringo Sheena.) ‡	"Girl Robot"	Ringo Sheena	Just Can't Help It.	2005	
"Shuraba" (修羅場; "Scene of Carnage") †	"The Rat's-Nest"	Ringo Sheena	Adult	2005	
"Σ" (Sigma) (Note: Originally a song by Ringo Sheena, a B-side from her "Gips" single (2000).) ‡	"Σ"	Ringo Sheena	Dynamite Out	2005	
"Sōnan" (遭難; "Disaster") †	"A Distress"	Ringo Sheena	Kyōiku	2004	
"Sono Onna Fushidara ni Tsuki" (その淑女ふしだらにつき; "That Woman Is Loose")	"The Lady Is a Tramp"	Lorenz Hart, Richard Rodgers	"Gunjō Biyori" (single)	2004	
"Sora ga Natteiru" (空が鳴っている; "The Sky Is Reverberating") †	"Reverberation"	Ringo Sheena, Seiji Kameda	Dai Hakken	2011	
"Sōretsu" (葬列; "Funeral") (Note: Originally a song by Ringo Sheena from Kalk Samen Kuri no Hana (2003).) ‡	"Courtesan"	Ringo Sheena	Chin Play Kō Play	2012	
"SSAW"	"Ss/aw"	Ringo Sheena, Ichiyo Izawa	Variety	2007	
"Super Star" (スーパースター, Sūpāsutā) (Note: First performed at the Dynamite tour (2005), live version released on Dynamite Out (2005).)	"Super Star"	Ringo Sheena, Seiji Kameda	Adult	2006	
"Sweet Spot" (スイートスポット, Suīto Supotto) #	"Sweet Spot"	Ringo Sheena, Ichiyo Izawa	Sports	2010	
"Tadanaranu Kankei" (ただならぬ関係; "Extraordinary Connection") #	"And the Beat Goes On"	Ukigumo, Ringo Sheena	Shin'ya Waku	2011	
"Tasogare Naki" (黄昏泣き; "Colic Cries")	"Don't Cry My Child"	Ringo Sheena	Adult	2006	
"Tegami" (手紙; "A Letter") (Note: Originally a song performed by Izawa's band NAM called "Umareku".)	"A Letter"	Ringo Sheena, Ichiyo Izawa	Adult	2006	
"Tengoku e Yōkoso" (天国へようこそ; "Welcome to Heaven") †	"Where's Heaven"	Ringo Sheena	Dai Hakken	2010	
"Tōmei Ningen" (透明人間; "Invisible Man") (Note: First performed at the Dynamite tour (2005), live version released on Dynamite Out (2005).)	"Invisible Man"	Ringo Sheena, Seiji Kameda	Adult	2006	
"Tsukigime Hime" (月極姫; "Monthly Princess")	"Prinsesse Mensuelle"	Ringo Sheena, Ukigumo	Variety	2007	
"Unten Kekkō" (雨天決行; "Play Not Suspended in Rain")	"Life Will Be Held Even If It Rains"	Ringo Sheena, Ichiyo Izawa	Sports	2010	
"Yukiguni" (雪国; "Snow Country")	"Niigata"	Ringo Sheena	Adult	2006	
"Yume no Ato" (夢のあと; "A Scar of Dreams")	"A Scar of Dreams"	Ringo Sheena	Kyōiku	2004	
"Zettaichi Tai Sōtaichi" (絶対値対相対値; "Relative vs. Absolute")	"Relative vs. Absolute"	Ringo Sheena, Ichiyo Izawa	Dai Hakken	2011	
"Zettai Zetsumei" (絶体絶命; "Desperate Situation")	"Life May Be Monotonous But the Sun Shines"	Ringo Sheena, Ichiyo Izawa	Sports	2010	

== Unreleased songs ==
Song	Writer(s)	Year	Leak	Ref.
"Gong" (ゴング, Gongu) (Petrolz cover)	Ukigumo	2006	Yes	
"Jazz a Go Go" (France Gall cover)	Robert Gall, Alain Goraguer	2004	Yes	
"Jihen Ondo" (事変音頭; "Incidents March")	Unknown	2004	No	
"Kabukichō no Joō" (歌舞伎町の女王; "Queen of Kabuki-chō") (Ringo Sheena cover)	Ringo Sheena	2004	No	
"Kanashiki Tenshi (Those Were the Days)" (悲しき天使; "Sad Angel")	Boris Fomin, Gene Raskin	2004	No	
"Kōfukuron" (幸福論; "Theory of Happiness") (Ringo Sheena cover)	Ringo Sheena	2004	No	
"La salle de bain" (Ringo Sheena cover)	Robbie Clark, Ringo Sheena	2004	Yes	
"M" (Appa cover)	Ichiyo Izawa	2006	No	
"Meisai" (迷彩; "Camouflage") (Ringo Sheena cover)	Ringo Sheena	2004	No	
"Stem" (Ringo Sheena cover)	Ringo Sheena	2004	Yes	
"Tadashii Machi" (正しい町; "The Right Town") (Ringo Sheena cover)	Ringo Sheena	2004	No	
"Tsumiki Asobi" (積木遊び; "Playing with Blocks") (Ringo Sheena cover)	Ringo Sheena	2004	Yes	
"UFO" (Pink Lady cover)	Shunichi Tokura, Yū Aku	2004	Yes	
"Yoake no Uta" (夜明けのうた; "Song of Daybreak") (Tokiko Iwatani cover)	Yōko Kishi, Taku Izumi	2011	Yes	
