= Shin'ya Waku =

Compilation album by Tokyo Jihen
- Released: August 29, 2012
- Recorded: 2004–2012
- Genre: Rock; pop; avant-garde; show tune
- Length: 46:01
- Language: Japanese; English
- Label: EMI Music Japan
- Producer: Tokyo Jihen

Tokyo Jihen chronology
| Tokyo Collection (2012) | Shin'ya Waku (2012) | Hard Disk (2013) |

Singles from Shin'ya Waku
- 1. "Tadanaranu Kankei" Released: August 15, 2012

Shin'ya Waku (深夜枠; "Late Night Broadcast Slot"), also known by its English title The Midnight Broadcasting is a compilation album by Japanese rock band Tokyo Jihen, released on August 29, 2012. It predominantly compiled B-sides from the band's singles, as well as a DVD exclusive song and a previously unreleased song, "Tadanaranu Kankei".

== Background and development ==
In early 2012, vocalist Ringo Sheena announced that the band would disband, after releasing their final extended play Color Bars and performing their farewell tour Bon Voyage in February 2012. In February 2012, the band released Tokyo Collection, a compilation of the band's songs performed live at different events and tours the band undertook.

The album was first announced on June 15, 2012, along with the band's DVD Chin Play Kō Play, released on the same date. In 2008, Sheena had released a similar B-side compilation, Watashi to Hōden, for her 10th anniversary celebrations.

The album's artwork was produced by Aki of the anime producers collective Nein. Sheena gave the character the name Muteki-chan (むてきちゃん; "Invincible-chan").

== Contents ==
The band released 11 B-sides between 2004 and 2007 (their 2010 digital single "Tengoku e Yōkoso / Dopa-mint!" and 2011 single "Sora ga Natteiru / Onna no Ko wa Dare Demo" did not feature any). Of these, only two were entirely written and composed by vocalist Ringo Sheena: "Kokoro" and "Rakujitsu". Three songs were pianist Ichiyo Izawa's compositions: "Pinocchio", "Gaman" and "Kaban no Nakami", while two were guitarist Ukigumo's: "BB.Queen" and "Karada". The song "Kao" was composed by the band's original guitarist Mikio Hirama, and is a vocal duet with him.

Three of the songs were covers of American songs. "Sono Onna Fushidara ni Tsuki" is a cover of the 1937 standard "The Lady Is a Tramp". "Dynamite" is a cover of the 1957 song by Brenda Lee, and "Koi wa Maboroshi (Get It Up for Love)" is a cover of a Ned Doheny's song from his 1976 album Hard Candy. All of these songs were performed in English.

"Handsome Sugite" is a song that appeared on the band's 2011 CS Channel DVD, which compiled Dai Hakken era videos. It was composed by Sheena, with lyrics by music video director Yuichi Kodama. While the song was also released digitally at the time, its appearance on Shin'ya Waku is the first time appearing on a physical release. "Tadanaranu Kankei" is a previously unpublished song written by Ukigumo, with additional lyrics by Sheena, that was given an additional title in English, "And the Beat Goes On".

The album features six songs sung in Japanese, along with seven sung in English (including the three cover songs). Translator Robbie Clark worked on Sheena's lyrics to create English language versions of what she had written.

== Promotion and release ==
To promote the release, the unpublished song "Tadanaranu Kankei" was released as a ringtone on August 8, and as a digital download exclusive to iTunes on August 15. The members were unsatisfied with releasing the song as solely audio, so briefly reformed in order to shoot a music video for the collection. The video was first published on August 8, 2012, and was directed by Yuichi Kodama.

The song was successful enough to peak at number six on Billboard's Japan Hot 100 chart, and number nine on their Japan Adult Contemporary Airplay chart in September 2012. The video was also successful, being nominated at the 2013 Space Shower Music Video Awards.

== Critical reception ==
The compilation was received positively by critics. Reviewer Reiko Tsuzura felt even though the songs were varied by nature, compiling them as an album made them as catchy as an original album. CDJournal reviewers believed the collection diluted Sheena's voice, and revealed aspects of the band that were not solely her.

== Track listing ==
Each song's original single or DVD is listed in italics, along with the original release year.

| No. | Title | Lyrics | Music | Length |
|---|---|---|---|---|
| 1. | "Handsome Sugite" (ハンサム過ぎて Hansamu Suite, "Too Handsome", CS Channel (2011)) | Yuichi Kodama | Ringo Sheena | 3:36 |
| 2. | "Karada" (体 "Body", Killer-tune (2007)) | R. Sheena, Robbie Clark | Ukigumo | 3:57 |
| 3. | "BB.Queen" (Killer-tune (2007)) | Ukigumo | Ukigumo | 3:20 |
| 4. | "Gaman" (我慢 "Endure", Nōdōteki Sanpunkan (2009)) | R. Sheena | Ichiyo Izawa | 3:33 |
| 5. | "Pinocchio" (ピノキオ Pinokio, OSCA (2007)) | I. Izawa | I. Izawa | 4:50 |
| 6. | "Kaban no Nakami" (鞄の中身 "Bag Contents", OSCA (2007)) | R. Sheena, R. Clark | I. Izawa | 3:27 |
| 7. | "Kokoro" (心 "Heart", Sōnan (2004)) | R. Sheena | R. Sheena | 4:06 |
| 8. | "Koi wa Maboroshi (Get It Up for Love)" (恋は幻 "Love Is a Phantom", Shuraba (2005)) | Ned Doheny | N. Doheny | 3:28 |
| 9. | "Rakujitsu" (落日 "Dusk", Shuraba (2005)) | R. Sheena | R. Sheena | 4:13 |
| 10. | "Dynamite" (ダイナマイト Dainamaito, Sōnan (2004)) | Tom Glazer | Mort Garson | 2:03 |
| 11. | "Sono Onna Fushidara ni Tsuki" (その淑女ふしだらにつき "The Lady Is a Tramp", Gunjō Biyori (2004)) | Lorenz Hart | Richard Rodgers | 2:23 |
| 12. | "Kao" (顔 "Faces", Gunjō Biyori (2004)) | R. Sheena | Mikio Hirama | 4:05 |
| 13. | "Tadanaranu Kankei" (ただならぬ関係 "Incomparable Relationship") | Ukigumo, R. Sheena | Ukigumo | 3:04 |
| Total length: | | | | 46:01 |

== Charts ==
| Chart (2012) | Peak position |
|---|---|
| Japan Oricon weekly albums | 3 |
| Japan Oricon monthly albums | 38 |
| Taiwan G-Music East Asian weekly chart | 11 |

=== Sales ===
| Chart | Amount |
|---|---|
| Oricon physical sales | 52,000 |

== Release history ==
| Region | Date | Format | Distributing Label | Catalogue codes |
|---|---|---|---|---|
| Japan | August 29, 2012 | CD, digital download | EMI Records Japan | TOCT-29000 |
| Taiwan | August 31, 2012 | CD | Gold Typhoon | I5286 |
| Japan | September 15, 2012 | Rental CD | EMI Records Japan | TOCT-29000 |
