= Atarashii Bunmei Kaika =

Song by Tokyo Jihen

from the album Dai Hakken
- Released: June 2, 2011
- Recorded: 2011
- Genre: Pop-rock, alternative rock
- Length: 4:31
- Label: EMI Music Japan
- Songwriter: Ringo Sheena Ichiyo Izawa Jack Brown

"Atarashii Bunmei Kaika" (新しい文明開化; "New Cultural Civilization" or "New Westernization"), also known by its English language title "Brand New Civilization", is a song by Japanese rock band Tokyo Jihen, led by musician Ringo Sheena. It was a promotional song for the band's fifth album Dai Hakken, released on June 29, 2011, and was used in commercials for Tokyo Metro.

== Background and development ==
After releasing their album Sports in February 2010, Tokyo Jihen undertook their Ultra C tour across Japan. In July they released two digital singles, "Tengoku e Yōkoso" for the drama Atami no Sōsakan and "Dopa-mint!" for Ezaki Glico's Watering Kissmint gum commercials. The band planned to release a double A-side single in February 2011, "Sora ga Natteiru" / "Onna no Ko wa Dare Demo", which was postponed until May due to drummer Toshiki Hata's incident involving a police officer in February 2010. The band's follow-up album, Dai Hakken, was first announced on May 9, 2011.

In 2010, Tokyo Metro used Yu Takahashi's song "Fukuwarai" as a song for their commercials. Previous years featured music by Yoko Kanno, Richard Rodgers, Pes from Rip Slyme, Kazunobu Mineta of Going Steady and Ging Nang Boyz, and Yoshiharu Abe from Unicorn.

== Writing and production ==
The song features music by band pianist Ichiyo Izawa, with lyrics and additional music by Ringo Sheena. The song is entirely in English, and was translated by Jack Brown, who had previously collaborated with vocalist Sheena on the song "Mittei Monogatari", featured on Sheena's 2009 solo album Sanmon Gossip. Izawa felt the song had a "different feeling to regular pop". Sheena asked Izawa if he could leave the song up to her to arrange.

This was the third time the band released a lead single in English. Tokyo Jihen's second album, Adult (2006) featured the song "Kenka Jōtō" as a promotional single, sung almost entirely in English. Their fourth album, Sports (2010) was promoted by the English language song "Kachi Ikusa", which was used in commercials for Ezaki Glico's Watering Kissmint gum.

== Promotion and release ==
The song was used in a commercial campaign for Tokyo Metro. The commercials began airing on May 20, and featured model Anne as their spokesperson. The song was first performed on September 24, 2011, at the band's Terebi Asahi Dream Music Festival festival appearance, and the song featured as a part of the set-list for their Discovery (2010) and Bon Voyage (2012) tours.

A music video for the song was released on June 13, 2011, directed by Yuichi Kodama. It features the band performing the song in bright clothing, while being backed by a cheer squad. After Kameda is tackled by a football player, he returns on screen in football gear with the label Atarashii Kameda Seiji (新しい亀田誠治; "New Seiji Kameda"). The additional scenes feature the band as cabin crew on an aeroplane, with Hata and Izawa acting as the pilots, Sheena as an air hostess, and Ukigumo Kameda as passengers, with Kameda sitting next to the football "new Kameda". Several scenes feature the band's crane logo. The first involves a cuckoo clock where the cuckoo has been replaced by the logo, and the second features a team of performers who create a moving crane logo. The band members act as judges, and give the performance high ratings.

== Critical reception ==
CDJournal called the song a "killer tune", noting the pleasant melody line and sprinting sound and praising Ukigumo's guitar solo in the introduction.

== Charts ==
Chart (2011)	Peak position
Japan Billboard Adult Contemporary Airplay	4
Japan Billboard Japan Hot 100	8

== Release history ==
Region	Date	Format	Distributing Label
Japan	May 20, 2011	Ringtone	EMI Music Japan
Japan	June 2, 2011	Cellphone download	EMI Music Japan
Japan	June 29, 2011	PC download	EMI Music Japan
