= Ringo Sheena videography =

Ringo Sheena video discography
- Video albums: 15
- Music videos: 42
- Films: 1

Japanese musician Ringo Sheena has filmed 42 music videos in her solo project single her debut in 1998. She has released a number of music video compilations and live concerts to VHS, DVD and Blu-ray, including the short film project Hyakuiro Megane, which was certified gold by the RIAJ for 100,000 copies shipped.

== Music videos ==
Year	Music video	Director(s)	Cast	Notes
1998	"Kōfukuron"	Hiroshi Usui	Rino Tokitsu	Filmed at Komazawa Olympic Park
1998	"Kabukichō no Joō"	Hiroshi Usui		
1999	"Koko de Kiss Shite."	Hiroshi Usui	Hisashi Nishikawa, Akihito Suzuki, Masatoshi Asauchi	
1999	"Koko de Kiss Shite." (alternative version)	Hiroshi Usui		
1999	"Honnō"	Yutaka Kimura	Kunihiro Suda, Yasunobu Torii	
1999	"Tsumiki Asobi"	Hiroshi Usui		
2000	"Σ"	Yutaka Kimura	Takeshi Hara, Yuka Yoshimura, Hisako Tabuchi, Seiji Kameda	
2000	"Gips"	Shuichi Banba	Hisashi Nishikawa, Makoto Totani, Eikichi Iwai, Makoto Minagawa	
2000	"Yami ni Furu Ame"	Shuichi Banba		
2000	"Identity"	Shuichi Banba	Junji Yayoshi	
2000	"Tsumi to Batsu"	Yutaka Kimura		
2001	"Mayonaka wa Junketsu"	Shuichi Banba	Masato Minagawa, Tokyo Ska Paradise Orchestra, Goethe	Animated music video.
2003	"Yattsuke Shigoto"	Hiroshi Usui	Masayuki Muraishi, Masato Minagawa, Seiji Kameda, Junji Yayoshi	
2003	"Stem (Daimyō Asobihen)"	Shuichi Banba	Kentaro Kobayashi, Koyuki, Nao Omori	
2003	"Meisai"	Shuichi Banba	Ahito Inazawa, Ukigumo, Hitoshi Watanabe, Neko Saito, Atsuhide Tsukuda, Keiko Yokomachi, Kazuki Yamaguchi	
2003	"Ichijiku no Hana"	Shuichi Banba		
2003	"La Salle De Bain"	Shuichi Banba		
2003	"Ringo no Uta"	Shuichi Banba, Masaaki Matsumoto		
2007	"Kono Yo no Kagiri"	Shuichi Banba		
2008	"Mellow"	Yuichi Kodama		
2009	"Shun"	Yutaka Kimura		
2009	"Ryūkō"	Yuichi Kodama	Daisuke Sakama (Mummy D), Tomoyasu Takeuchi	
2009	"Irokoizata"	Yuichi Kodama	Yukina Sakai	
2009	"Tsugō no Ii Karada"	Yuichi Kodama		Musical-style music video which Sheena co-starred with animation characters.
2009	"Ariamaru Tomi"	Yuichi Kodama		Sheena does not appear.
2011	"Carnation"	Yuichi Kodama	Tokyo Jihen and the other members of the orchestra	
2012	"Jiyū e Michizure"	Yasuyuki Ozeki	Nana Komatsu	Sheena does not appear.
2013	"Irohanihoheto"	Yuichi Kodama		
2013	"It Was You"	Yuichi Kodama		
2013	"Netsuai Hakkakuchū"	Yuichi Kodama		
2014	"Seishun no Matataki"	Yuichi Kodama		
2014	"Arikitari na Onna"	Yuichi Kodama		
2017	"Jinsei wa Yume Darake"	Yuichi Kodama		
2018	"Kemono yuku Hosomichi" (with Hiroji Miyamoto)			
2019	"Niwatori to Hebi to Buta"			
2019	"Menuki Doori"		Tortoise Matsumoto	
2019	"Kouzen no Himitsu"			
2019	"Roman to Soroban"		Hikaru Utada	
2025	"La velada legendaria"	Yuichi Kodama	Aya Sato, Mana Ikeda, Mayuka, Monet, RIOTAROS, Hana, Yutaro, Ao, Minami, Sayaka Kamioka, Rina, Asuka, Yui, You	
2025	"Under Experiment"	Yuichi Kodama	Shun Ishiwaka, Keisuke Torigoe, Yukio Nagoshi, Powlow	
2025	"Este nuevo problema"	Yuichi Kodama	Noritaka Hamao, Masaki Hayashi, Keisuke Torigoe, Shun Ishiwaka	
2025	"Fair and Square"	Yuichi Kodama	Shun Ishiwaka, Keisuke Torigoe, Yukio Nagoshi	
2026	"Treasure"	Yuichi Kodama		

== Video albums ==
=== Music video compilations ===
List of media, with selected chart positions
Title	Album details	Peak positions		
Title	Album details	JPN DVD	JPN Blu-ray	TWN (Note: Position was taken from 2008 week 27 for Watashi no Hatsuden.)
Seiteki Healing: Sono-Ichi (性的ヒーリング～其ノ壱～; "Sexual Healing Vol. 1")	Released: November 10, 1999; Label: Toshiba EMI; Formats: VHS, DVD	3 (Note: DVD re-release position in 2000. Original VHS position not archived by Oricon.)	—	—
Seiteki Healing: Sono-Ni (性的ヒーリング～其ノ弐～; "Sexual Healing Vol. 2")	Released: August 30, 2000; Label: Toshiba EMI; Formats: DVD, VHS	2	—	—
Seiteki Healing: Sono-San (性的ヒーリング～其ノ参～; "Sexual Healing Vol. 3")	Released: August 20, 2003; Label: Toshiba EMI; Formats: DVD	6	—	—
Watashi no Hatsuden (私の発電; "My Power Generation")	Released: July 2, 2008; Label: Virgin; Formats: DVD	1	—	4
Seiteki Healing: Sono-Yon (性的ヒーリング～其ノ四～; "Sexual Healing Vol. 4")	Released: August 26, 2009; Label: Virgin; Formats: DVD	5	—	—
The Sexual Healing Total Care Course 120min.	Released: November 13, 2013; Label: Universal Music; Formats: 2-DVD, BD	16	7	—
Seiteki Healing: Sono-Go~Nana (性的ヒーリング〜其の五〜七〜; "Sexual Healing Vol. 5-7")	Scheduled: December 11, 2019; Label: Universal Music; Formats: 2-DVD, BD	—	—	—
The Sexual Healing Total Orgasm Experience	Scheduled: December 11, 2019; Label: Universal Music; Formats: 4-DVD, 2-BD	—	—	—

== Concert tour films ==
List of media, with selected chart positions
Title	Album details	Peak positions		
Title	Album details	JPN DVD	JPN Blu-ray	TWN (Note: Position was taken from 2009 week 11 for Watashi no Hatsuden, 2014 week 13 for Tōtaikai.)
Gekokujyo Xstasy	Released: December 7, 2000; Label: Toshiba EMI; Formats: DVD, VHS, Blu-ray	2	—	—
Hatsuiku Status: Gokiritsu Japon	Performance as the band Hatsuiku Status; Released: December 7, 2000; Label: Toshiba EMI; Formats: DVD, VHS, Blu-ray	3	—	—
Baishō Ecstasy (賣笑エクスタシー; "Prostitute Ecstasy")	Released: May 27, 2003; Label: Toshiba EMI; Formats: DVD+CD, Blu-ray	2	—	—
Electric Mole	Released: December 17, 2003; Label: Virgin; Formats: DVD, Blu-ray	8	219	—
Dai Ikkai Ringohan Taikai no Moyō	Released: February 21, 2007; Label: Virgin; Formats: DVD, Blu-ray	5	—	—
Zazen Xstasy	Released: September 17, 2008; Label: Virgin; Formats: DVD, Blu-ray	2	—	—
Ringo Expo 08	Released: March 11, 2009; Label: Virgin; Formats: DVD, Blu-ray	2	206	3
Tōtaikai: Heisei Nijūgo-nendo Kamiyama-chō Taikai (党大会 平成二十五年度神山町大会; "The Party Convention: 2013 Kamiyama Event")	Released: March 19, 2014; Label: Virgin; Formats: DVD, DVD+CD, Blu-ray, Blu-ray+CD	9	7	8
(Nama) Ringo-haku '14: Toshionna no Gyakushū ((生)林檎博'14 -年女の逆襲-; "(Live) Ringo Expo '14: Counterattack of the Zodiac Woman of the Year")	Released: March 18, 2015; Label: Virgin; Formats: DVD, Blu-ray	TBA	TBA	TBA
Shiina Ringo to Kyatsura ga Yuku: Hyakkiyakō 2015 (椎名林檎と彼奴等がゆく 百鬼夜行2015; "Ringo Sheena and the Others Go: Night Parade of Demons and Ghosts 2015")	Released: May 31, 2017; Label: EMI; Formats: 2-DVD, Blu-ray	TBA	TBA	TBA
Shiina Ringo to Kyatsura no Iru: Shinkū Chitai (椎名林檎と彼奴等の居る 真空地帯; "Ringo Sheena and the Others: Airpocket")	Released: October 20, 2018 (Kronekodow release), November 21, 2018 (commercial release); Label: EMI; Formats: DVD, Blu-ray	TBA	TBA	TBA
(Nama) Ringo-haku '18: Fuwaku no Yoyū ((生)林檎博'18 -不惑の余裕-; "(Live) Ringo Expo '18")	Released: May 1, 2019 (Kronekodow release), May 27, 2019 (commercial release); Label: EMI; Formats: DVD, Blu-ray	TBA	TBA	TBA

=== Concert tour video box sets ===
List of media, with selected chart positions
Title	Album details	Peak positions		
Title	Album details	JPN DVD	JPN Blu-ray	TWN (Note: Position was taken from 2009 week 11 for Watashi no Hatsuden, 2014 week 13 for Tōtaikai.)
Live	Contains: Gekokujyo Xstasy, Hatsuiku Status: Gokiritsu Japon, Baishō Ecstasy, Electric Mole, Zazen Xstasy, Ringo Expo 08, Dai Ikkai Ringohan Taikai no Moyō and Senkō Ecstasy; Released: November 13, 2013; Label: Virgin; Formats: 8-Blu-ray	—	6	—

=== Short film ===
List of media, with selected chart positions
Title	Album details	Peak positions	Certifications
Title	Album details	JPN DVD	Certifications
Tanpen Kinema: Hyakuiro Megane (短篇キネマ 百色眼鏡; "Short Film: Kaleidoscope")	40 minute film based on Kalk Samen Kuri no Hana; Released: January 22, 2003; Label: Toshiba EMI; Formats: DVD	2	RIAJ: Gold

== See also ==
- List of bands associated with Ringo Sheena
- Ringo Sheena production discography
- Ringo Sheena discography
- Tokyo Jihen discography
