= Season Sayonara =

Song by Tokyo Jihen

from the album Sports
- Released: February 8, 2010
- Recorded: 2009
- Genre: Alternative rock
- Length: 3:38
- Label: EMI Music Japan
- Songwriter: Ukigumo

"Season Sayonara" (シーズンサヨナラ, Shīzun Sayonara; "Season Farewell"), stylised in English as "Season SAYONARA", is a song by Japanese rock band Tokyo Jihen, led by musician Ringo Sheena. It was one of the promotional songs for the band's fourth album Sports, released on February 24, 2010.

== Background and development ==
In 2009, Tokyo Jihen released the single "Nōdōteki Sanpunkan", which was their first song to feature in commercials for Ezaki Glico's Watering Kissmint brand of gum. The Sports album was first announced on December 15, 2009. The first promotional song from the album was "Kachi Ikusa", released on January 16, 2010, and used in Watering Kissmint commercials.

Guitarist Ukigumo had previously written songs for the band's Variety album in 2007, most notably the single "OSCA". While vocalist Ringo Sheena typically either composed or wrote lyrics for Tokyo Jihen songs, "Season Sayonara" is an example of a song written entirely by Ukigumo.

== Writing and production ==
The song was one of four compositions written by Ukigumo that appear on Sports, including the songs "Fair", "Foul" and "Kimaru". "Season Sayonara" and "Foul" were two songs that were part of Ukigumo's already existing stock of songs, that were not written specifically for the album. These two were songs that vocalist Ringo Sheena had heard in the past, and considered "sporty", fitting the theme of the album. "Season Sayonara" and "Fair" were the first two songs recorded for the album (excluding "Senkō Shōjo", which was recorded during the Variety sessions) Ukigumo liked Ichiyo Izawa's piano backing for the song, as he had struggled to consider how he himself could back the song on the guitar.

The song is primarily sung in Japanese by vocalist Sheena, with additional background vocals by Ukigumo. Lyrically, the song deals with someone looking back at a failed relationship, while making references to different seasons.

== Promotion and release ==
The song was first released digitally to cellphones on February 8, 2010. This was the same day that "Denpa Tsūshin" was released to cellphones, and that the song "Sweet Spot" was released to iTunes. The song was first performed as a part of the set-list for their Ultra C tour in 2010, and also featured on their farewell Bon Voyage tour in 2012.

== Critical reception ==
CDJournal felt the song's "vague sadness" was part of its charm, and described it as an "upper pop" song. Yoshiki Aoyuki of Listenmusic noted the song's "jazzy piano" and 8 beat drums.

== Commercial reception ==
The song began receiving airplay in February 2010, peaking at number 11 and charting for four weeks on Billboard's top airplay chart. In the same period, it charted for a single week at adult contemporary radio stations, peaking at number 7. This resulted in the song debuting at number 13 on the Japan Hot 100. "Season Sayonara" was the most successful promotional single from Sports, beating "Kachi Ikusa" which had peaked at number 30, and "Denpa Tsūshin" and "Sweet Spot", neither of which charted.

== Personnel ==
Personnel details were sourced from Sports' liner notes booklet.

- Toshiki Hata – drums
- Uni Inoue – recording, mixing, manipulation
- Ichiyo Izawa – keyboards
- Seiji Kameda – bass
- Ringo Sheena – vocals
- Miyamoto Shigeo – mastering
- Ukigumo – guitar

== Chart rankings ==
| Chart (2010) | Peak position |
|---|---|
| Japan Billboard Adult Contemporary Airplay | 7 |
| Japan Billboard Japan Hot 100 | 13 |

== Release history ==
| Region | Date | Format | Distributing Label |
|---|---|---|---|
| Japan | February 8, 2010 | Ringtone, cellphone download | EMI Music Japan |
| Japan | February 24, 2010 | PC download | EMI Music Japan |
