= Color Bars =

Color Bars may refer to:

- Color Bars (EP), by Tokyo Jihen, 2012
- "Color Bars", a song of the Elliott Smith album Figure 8

== See also ==
- EBU colour bars
- SMPTE color bars
