= Nagaku Mijikai Matsuri =

"Nagaku Mijikai Matsuri/Kamisama, Hotokesama"

Single by Ringo Sheena

from the album Sandokushi
- Released: August 5, 2015
- Recorded: 2015
- Length: 7:48
- Label: Virgin Records
- Songwriter: Ringo Sheena
- Producer: Uni Inoue

Ringo Sheena singles chronology
"Saihate ga Mitai" (2015)	"Nagaku Mijikai Matsuri/Kamisama, Hotokesama" (2015)

"Nagaku Mijikai Matsuri/Kamisama, Hotokesama" (Japanese: 長く短い祭／神様、仏様; "No verão, as noites / God, nor Buddha") (Note: "Nagaku Mijikai Matsuri" has a Portuguese title in Western languages, but it literally means "long and short festival" in English.) is Ringo Sheena's 15th single and her 2nd double A-side single. It was released on 31 July 2015 by Universal Music Japan.

== Background and development ==
"Nagaku Mijikai Matsuri" was used in advertisements for Coca-Cola Japan's 2015 summer campaign. "Kamisama, Hotokesama" was used as an TV commercial jingle for the au smartphone "isai vivid" manufactured by LG Electronics, in which Sheena also stars in the commercial.

A picture of the Nebuta Matsuri was used for the album artwork of the single.

Sheena sings two duets in both songs with two of her close male musician friends: Ryosuke Nagaoka, also known as Ukigumo (member of Tokyo Jihen) in "Nagaku Mijikai Matsuri" and Shutoku Mukai for "Kamisama, Hotokesama".

== Music video ==
Both videos for "Nagaku Mijikai Matsuri" and "Kamisama, Hotokesama" are directed by Yuichi Kodama. The video of "Nagaku Mijikai Matsuri" is inspired by the song theme "the summer of woman’s life". The first video shows an impatient heroine interspersed with scenes of Sheena and Ukigumo singing a duet together. The session musicians who played the song at the recording session there also appear on the "Kamisama, Hotokesama" video, where they play as spectres of the "Hyakki Yagyō".

Both music videos were released in full on 31 July 2015 at Ringo Sheena's YouTube channel.

== Track listing ==
All music is composed by Ringo Sheena.

CD single
No.	Title	Lyrics	Arranger(s)	Length
1.	"Nagaku Mijikai Matsuri"	Ringo Sheena	Ringo Sheena; Yoichi Murata (wind instruments)	4:09
2.	"Kamisama, Hotokesama"	Ringo Sheena; Shutoku Mukai	Ringo Sheena; Yoichi Murata (wind instruments)	3:39
Total length:				7:48

== Credits and personnel ==
Credits are taken from the singles's liner notes.

Nagaku Mijikai Matsuri

- Ringo Sheena – vocals, songwriter, arrangement, digital programming
- Ryosuke Nagaoka – vocals
- Tom Tamada – drums
- Keisuke Torigoe – bass
- Masayuki Hiizumi – wurlitzer & piano
- Koji Nishimura – trumpet
- Masahiko Sugasaka – trumpet
- Yoichi Murata – trombone, wind instrument arrangement
- Mataro Misawa – percussion
- Uni Inoue – recording & mixing

Kamisama, Hotokesama

- Ringo Sheena – vocals, songwriter, arrangement
- Tom Tamada – drums
- Keisuke Torigoe – bass
- Masayuki Hiizumi – clavinet
- Ryosuke Nagaoka – guitar, sitar & background vocals
- Koji Nishimura – trumpet
- Masahiko Sugasaka – trumpet
- Yoichi Murata – trombone, wind instrument arrangement
- Takuo Yamamoto – tenor sax & flute
- U-zhaan – tabla
- Shutoku Mukai – vocals, lyrics
- Uni Inoue – recording & mixing
