= Kon'ya wa Karasawagi =

Song by Tokyo Jihen

from the album Color Bars
- Released: January 1, 2012
- Recorded: 2011
- Genre: Alternative rock, jazz kayō
- Length: 3:42
- Label: EMI Music Japan
- Songwriter: Ringo Sheena

"Kon'ya wa Karasawagi" (今夜はから騒ぎ; "Tonight Is Much Ado About Nothing"), also known by its French language title "Beaucoup de Bruit pour Rien", is a song by Japanese rock band Tokyo Jihen, led by musician Ringo Sheena. It was a promotional song for the band's final original release, the extended play Color Bars, released on January 18, 2012.

== Background and development ==
In 2010, the band performed their Discovery tour for their fifth album Dai Hakken. The extended play Color Bars was first announced on November 15, 2011, as a release featuring five songs each written by a different member of the band. "Kon'ya wa Karasawagi" represented the song vocalist Ringo Sheena wrote for the release. Vocalist Ringo Sheena made their first performance at the 62nd NHK Kōhaku Uta Gassen on December 31, 2011, at which she and the band performed a medley of "Onna no Ko wa Dare Demo" and Sheena's solo song "Carnation".

== Writing and production ==
The song features lyrics and music by Sheena. The other Color Bars songs were songs that had existed before the release that were suggested but did not appear on other releases. "Kon'ya wa Karasawagi" was the final song, which Sheena struggled over on the best way to express. She wrote the lyrics in the image of Tokyo, and wrote the melody in the most natural way she composes songs, without deviating.

== Promotion and release ==
The song was first performed by the band during the Discovery tour, from September 30 until December 26, 2011. It was also a part of their Bon Voyage farewell tour in February 2012. At Sheena's mini-tour Chotto Shita Recohatsu 2014 to promote her album Gyakuyunyū: Kōwankyoku (2014), Sheena performed the song as a solo artist as the final song of the encore. The band also made an appearance on Music Station to perform the song on January 20, 2012.

A music video for the song directed by Yuichi Kodama was unveiled on January 1, 2012. It features each band member in a different style of 1800s clothing, in a wooden building. Several scenes feature money being thrown into the air, and each member sits at a wooden desk signing their name to a contract. Sheena loads a rifle and shoots a member in a bathroom, followed by scenes of the band performing the song in a dance hall. The video was nominated for the Best Video of the Year award at the 2012 MTV Video Music Awards Japan.

== Critical reception ==
CDJournal called the song a "rhythmic and stylish pop song, injected with a jazzy essence by a Hammond organ-style piano sound, and felt the song was a homage for "ever-changing Tokyo". Listenmusic reviewer Yoshiki Aoyuki felt the song had a "Shōwa latin kayō taste" not unlike Sheena's solo songs "Kabukichō no Joō" (1998) "Marunouchi Sadistic" (1999). Both reviewer Reiko Tsuzura and Yuya Shimizu of Rolling Stone Japan called the "jazz kayō".

== Charts ==
Chart (2012)	Peak position
Japan Billboard Adult Contemporary Airplay	4
Japan Billboard Japan Hot 100	4
Japan RIAJ Digital Track Chart	62

== Release history ==
Region	Date	Format	Distributing Label
Japan	January 1, 2012	Ringtone, cellphone download	EMI Music Japan
Japan	January 11, 2012	PC download	EMI Music Japan
