= Sora ga Natteiru =

- "Sora ga Natteiru/Onna no Ko wa Dare Demo" EP cover.

Single by Tokyo Jihen

from the album Dai Hakken
- Released: February 8, 2011
- Recorded: 2010
- Genre: Alternative rock
- Length: 3:50
- Label: EMI Music Japan
- Songwriter: Ringo Sheena Seiji Kameda

Tokyo Jihen singles chronology
"Dopa-mint!" (2010)	"Sora ga Natteiru" (2011)	"Onna no Ko wa Dare Demo" (2011)

"Sora ga Natteiru" (空が鳴っている; "The Sky Is Ringing"), also known by its English name "The Reverberation", is one of the A-sides of the single "Sora ga Natteiru/Onna no Ko wa Dare Demo" by Japanese rock band Tokyo Jihen, led by musician Ringo Sheena. The song was the band's fourth to be used in a commercial campaign for Ezaki Glico's Watering Kissmint brand of gum. It was released digitally in February 2011, and eventually physically on May 11, 2011, after the three-month postponement of the physical edition.

== Background and development ==
In July 2010, Tokyo Jihen released two digital singles: "Tengoku e Yōkoso", the theme song for the drama Atami no Sōsakan, and "Dopa-mint!", Tokyo Jihen's third song used Ezaki Glico's Watering Kissmint range of gum. The band performed at the EMI Rocks festival on November 6, 2010, celebrating 50 years of the EMI label.

The band produced the single "Oishii Kisetsu" / "Ketteiteki Sanpunkan" for entertainer Chiaki Kuriyama, which was released on March 2, 2011. After the 2011 Tōhoku earthquake and tsunami occurred on March 11, the band released a cover of Tokiko Iwatani's 1964 song "Yoake no Uta" to YouTube.

The single was first announced on December 10, 2010, with a preliminary release date of February 23, 2011.

== Writing and production ==
The music for the song was written by Seiji Kameda, an infrequent songwriter for the band. Kameda wrote the tracks "Superstar" and "Tōmei Ningen" from Adult, and most notably the digital single "Senkō Shōjo" (2007), which was commercially successful enough to be certified gold by the RIAJ twice. Kameda considered the songs he had written for the band as all "bright", so wanted to attempt to make sad or dark songs. The song was originally called "Breast" in the demo stage. When deciding which song was the best for the commercial, the band unanimously picked Kameda's composition, as they wanted to try something different from the songs previously featured in the campaign.

== Promotion and release ==
The song was first used in Watering Kissmint commercials from February 8, 2011. The commercial was directed by long-time collaborator Yuichi Kodama, who also directed the music video for the song.

On February 12, band drummer Toshiki Hata was charged with interfering with a public servant, after hitting a police officer during an incident on February 10, when the officer had been called to a residence to investigate broken glass. As a result, the single was postponed, and all promotional activities involving Hata were ceased. All mention of the single's release date were removed from Tokyo Jihen's website. The Watering Kissmint commercials began airing again from February 16, however with a rearranged "solo" version of the song entitled the "Shinkai-han" (深海版; "Deep Sea Edition"), that did not feature Hata's drumming. The song was intended to be performed on Music Station on February 18, with "Onna no Ko wa Dare Demo" being performed the next week, however these appearances were cancelled. The band eventually resumed activities together on April 5, 2011, and the single was given the new release date of May 11.

The song was first performed at the Terebi Asahi Dream Music Festival on September 24, 2011. It was additionally performed during the band's Discovery (2011) and Bon Voyage (2012) tours. These performances can be found on the tours' respective DVDs.

== Music video ==
The music video was first unveiled on February 8, 2011, and was made available for streaming from the band's website. It was directed by Yuichi Kodama, who also took charge of the video for "Onna no Ko wa Dare Demo", as well as the commercials for Watering Kissmint, and Shiseido's Maquillage commercials featuring "Onna no Ko wa Dare Demo".

The video depicts the band performing the song as they sit around a table, eating breakfast foods. It also features close-up scenes of each member by themselves. Ukigumo is seen sitting in a parked car in a garage. Izawa is shown taking an eye examination, and Hata shown sitting on a couch, watching video footage of squirrels. Kameda is shown removing a pair of leather gloves at a table. Sheena is shown sitting in a corner of a room. Outside scenes are shown taken from a vehicle of a frosty countryside. Director Kodama revealed that Hata is meant to be watching the Discovery Channel, tying in with the theme of the album Dai Hakken.

== Critical reception ==
CDJournal reviewers called the song a "cool rock tune", and "hard boiled rock" with a "disturbing atmosphere", feeling the guitar intro gave the song a tense, running sound and noting the heaviness in Sheena's vocals. Hot Express reviewer Haruna Takakawa felt the song was very "Tokyo Jihen-like", likening it to the impact of "Gunjō Biyori". She praised the song's "sharpened sound and lyrics" and Sheena's "emotional vocals", noting that everything in the song is balanced and simple, that there was nothing superfluous.

== Track listing ==
No.	Title	Lyrics	Music	Length
1.	"Sora ga Natteiru"	Ringo Sheena	Seiji Kameda	3:50
2.	"Onna no Ko wa Dare Demo"	R. Sheena	R. Sheena	3:56
Total length:				7:46

== Personnel ==
Personnel details were sourced from Dai Hakken's liner notes booklet.

Musicians and personnel

- Yumi Fujikura – assistant engineer
- Junichiro Fujinami – assistant engineer
- Toshiki Hata – drums
- Uni Inoue – recording engineer, mixing engineer
- Ichiyo Izawa – keyboards
- Seiji Kameda – bass
- Shigeo Miyamoto – mastering engineer
- Ringo Sheena – vocals
- Ukigumo – guitar

== Charts ==
Chart (2011)	Peak position
Japan Billboard Adult Contemporary Airplay	24
Japan Billboard Japan Hot 100	11
Japan Oricon weekly singles: "Sora ga Natteiru/Onna no Ko wa Dare Demo"	6
Japan Oricon monthly singles: "Sora ga Natteiru/Onna no Ko wa Dare Demo"	13
Japan RIAJ Digital Track Chart	40

=== Sales and certifications ===
Chart	Amount
Oricon physical sales	54,000

== Release history ==
Region	Date	Format	Distributing Label	Catalogue codes
Japan	February 8, 2011	Ringtone, cellphone download	EMI Music Japan	
Japan	May 11, 2011	CD, Rental CD, digital download (EP)	EMI Music Japan	TOCT-40320
Taiwan	May 13, 2011	CD	Gold Typhoon	I5205
