= Tokyo Collection =

Live album by Tokyo Jihen
- Released: February 15, 2012
- Recorded: February 9, 2005 – December 7, 2011
- Venue: Tokyo International Forum; Tokyo Dome City Hall; Zepp Tokyo; NHK Hall; Nagoya Century Hall
- Genre: Pop, alternative rock
- Length: 61:59
- Label: EMI Music Japan, Virgin Music
- Producer: Tokyo Jihen, Uni Inoue

Tokyo Jihen chronology
Color Bars (2012)	Tokyo Collection (2012)	Shin'ya Waku (2012)

Tokyo Collection is the first live album by the Japanese band Tokyo Jihen, released on February 15, 2012 by EMI Music Japan / Virgin Music. It also served as the band's first greatest hits album. The first press edition is a cardboard sleeve.

== Track listing ==
All lyrics are written by Ringo Sheena, except where noted.

No.	Title	Lyrics	Music	Recorded	Length
1.	"A Separation" (三十二歳の別れ Sanjūni-sai no Wakare)		Sheena	7 December 2011 at Tokyo International Forum Hall A	3:42
2.	"Jeux interdits" (禁じられた遊び Kinjirareta Asobi)		Ichiyō Izawa; Sheena	7 December 2011 at Tokyo International Forum Hall A	3:50
3.	"Un homme et une femme" (かつては男と女 Katsute wa Otoko to Onna)		Ukigumo	7 December 2011 at Tokyo International Forum Hall A	4:25
4.	"Killer-tune"		Izawa	12 May 2010 at Tokyo International Forum Hall A	3:25
5.	"OSCA"	Ukigumo	Ukigumo	12 May 2010 at Tokyo International Forum Hall A	5:38
6.	"Mirror-ball"	Ukigumo	Ukigumo	24 August 2008 at Tokyo Dome City Hall	4:19
7.	"Vengeance" (復讐 Fukushū)		Ukigumo	21 November 2007 at Zepp Tokyo	4:57
8.	"Pinocchio"	Izawa	Izawa	21 November 2007 at Zepp Tokyo	5:13
9.	"Senkō Shōjo"		Seiji Kameda	21 November 2007 at Zepp Tokyo	3:07
10.	"Invisible Man" (透明人間 Tōmei Ningen)		Kameda	26 May 2006 at NHK Hall	4:45
11.	"Marunouchi Sadistic"		Sheena	26 May 2006 at NHK Hall	4:24
12.	"Super Star"		Kameda	9 February 2005 at Nagoya Century Hall	4:40
13.	"Gunjō Biyori"		HZM	9 February 2005 at Nagoya Century Hall	3:48
14.	"A Scar of Dreams" (夢のあと Yume no Ato)		Sheena	9 February 2005 at Nagoya Century Hall	5:39
