= Kachi Ikusa =

Song by Tokyo Jihen

from the album Sports
- Released: January 16, 2010
- Recorded: 2009
- Genre: Pop-rock, alternative rock
- Length: 3:28
- Label: EMI Music Japan
- Songwriter(s): Ringo Sheena Robbie Clark

"Kachi Ikusa" (勝ち戦; "Winning Battle"), also known by its English language title "Win Every Fight", is a song by Japanese rock band Tokyo Jihen, led by musician Ringo Sheena. It was one of the promotional songs for the band's fourth album Sports, released on February 24, 2010, and was used in commercials for Ezaki Glico's Watering Kissmint gum.

== Background and development ==
In 2009, Tokyo Jihen released the single "Nōdōteki Sanpunkan", which was their first song to feature in commercials for Ezaki Glico's Watering Kissmint brand of gum. The single was commercially successful, peaking at number one on Oricon's singles chart, and being certified gold twice for digital downloads.

The Sports album was first announced on December 15, 2009.

== Writing and production ==
The song is one of two entirely written and composed by Sheena from Sports. It features lyrics written by Sheena, translated into English by Robbie Clark. Sheena felt that she needed to create some "spirited sporty songs" to match the compositions Ichiyo Izawa and Ukigumo had already written for the album. The song was recorded by the band without much special preparation, just naturally performing.

== Promotion and release ==
The song served as the second song used in Ezaki Glico's Watering Kissmint advertisement campaign featuring Ringo Sheena as a spokesperson. The commercials began airing on January 16, 2010, and the song was released digitally to cellphones on the same day. The commercials were directed by Yuichi Kodama, who had worked as a music video director with the band since "OSCA" in 2007.

The song was first performed on December 30, 2009, at the band's Countdown Japan festival appearance. The song featured as a part of the set-list for their Ultra C (2010) and Bon Voyage (2012) tours, and also was performed at the EMI Rocks festival in 2010. The band also appeared on Music Station on February 19, 2010 to perform the song.

On February 8, 2010, a music video directed by Kodama was released for the song. It features the band posing in the centre of a stage, while rotating cameras move around them. The final scenes feature the band performing the song with their instruments on the circular stage.

== Critical reception ==
CDJournal believed the song had the ability to invigorate and excite people, and felt the band was using a "Beatles manner". Listenmusic reviewer Yoshiki Aoyuki noted the song's "geometric and advanced ensemble", likening it to the works of Steely Dan.

== Personnel ==
Personnel details were sourced from Sports' liner notes booklet.

- Toshiki Hata – drums
- Uni Inoue – recording, mixing, manipulation
- Ichiyo Izawa – keyboards
- Seiji Kameda – bass
- Ringo Sheena – vocals
- Miyamoto Shigeo – mastering
- Ukigumo – guitar

== Chart rankings ==
Chart (2010)	Peak position
Japan Billboard Adult Contemporary Airplay	41
Japan Billboard Japan Hot 100	30
Japan RIAJ Digital Track Chart	58

== Release history ==
Region	Date	Format	Distributing Label
Japan	January 16, 2010	Ringtone, cellphone download	EMI Music Japan
Japan	February 24, 2010	PC download	EMI Music Japan
