= Dopa-mint! =

- "Tengoku e Yōkoso/Dopa-Mint!" digital EP cover.

Single by Tokyo Jihen

from the album Dai Hakken
- Released: July 23, 2010
- Recorded: 2010
- Genre: Pop-rock, alternative rock
- Length: 2:43
- Label: EMI Music Japan
- Songwriter: Ringo Sheena Ichiyo Izawa

Tokyo Jihen singles chronology
"Tengoku e Yōkoso" (2010)	"Dopa-mint!" (2010)	"Sora ga Natteiru" (2011)

"Dopa-mint!" (ドーパミント!, Dōpāminto!) is a single by Japanese rock band Tokyo Jihen, led by musician Ringo Sheena. It was released on October 23, 2010, and was used in commercials for Ezaki Glico's Watering Kissmint gum.

== Background and development ==
In 2009, Tokyo Jihen released the single "Nōdōteki Sanpunkan", which was their first song to feature in commercials for Ezaki Glico's Watering Kissmint brand of gum. The single was commercially successful, peaking at number one on Oricon's singles chart, and being certified gold twice for digital downloads. Tokyo Jihen's song "Kachi Ikusa" from the album Sports served at the second commercial song for the campaign in January 2010.

A week before the single's digital release, Tokyo Jihen had released "Tengoku e Yōkoso", the theme song for the Japanese drama Atami no Sōsakan. Both songs were compiled together on a digital EP.

== Writing and production ==
Two editions of the song exist, the original and the version that appears on Dai Hakken, labelled "Dopa-mint! BPM103", as opposed to the original version's BPM of 199. The original version was eventually released to CD in 2013, on Tokyo Jihen's Hard Disk box set.

The song was recorded in June 2010, after the band had finished their Ultra C tour. Unlike "Tengoku e Yōkoso" which was tailored specifically for the drama Atami no Sōsakan, the band members brought many demos to the recording sessions for everyone to decide which the best one was. Eventually, a song Izawa had written especially was chosen, and the band worked on it through the night right up until the deadline that Ezaki Glico had set. The song was rearranged for Dai Hakken, as it was an album where the band considered the album's arrangement more carefully.

== Promotion and release ==
The song served as the third song used in Ezaki Glico's Watering Kissmint advertisement campaign featuring Ringo Sheena as a spokesperson. The commercials began airing on July 27, 2010. Tokyo Jihen were featured in issues of Rockin' On Japan and Switch to promote the release, as well as the NHK program The Star airing an interview with Sheena. The song was first performed at the EMI Rocks festival on November 6, 2010. The band performed the song once during a Tokyo Jihen tour, the 2011 Discovery tour, in which they played the BPM103 version.

== Critical reception ==
In reviewing the BPM103 version, CDJournal reviewers felt the song's development was "unrestrainted", feeling that each member of Tokyo Jihen's abilities could be seen in parts of the song.

== Track listing ==
Digital EP
No.	Title	Lyrics	Music	Length
1.	"Tengoku e Yōkoso"	Ringo Sheena	R. Sheena	3:00
2.	"Dopa-Mint!"	R. Sheena	Ichiyo Izawa	2:43
Total length:				5:43

== Chart rankings ==
Chart (2010)	Peak position
Japan Billboard Adult Contemporary Airplay	41
Japan Billboard Japan Hot 100	36
Japan RIAJ Digital Track Chart	38

== Release history ==
Region	Date	Format	Distributing Label
Japan	July 23, 2010	Digital download	EMI Music Japan
Japan	July 28, 2010	Ringtone	EMI Music Japan
