= Senkō Shōjo =

- "Senkō Shōjo" digital download cover.

Single by Tokyo Jihen

from the album Variety Zōkangō and Sports
- Released: October 18, 2007
- Recorded: 2007
- Genre: Pop-rock, Rock
- Length: 2:59
- Label: EMI Music Japan
- Songwriters: Ringo Sheena, Seiji Kameda, Robbie Clark (English version)
- Producer: Tokyo Jihen

Tokyo Jihen singles chronology
"Killer-tune" (2007)	"Senkō Shōjo" (2007)	"Nōdōteki Sanpunkan" (2009)

"Senkō Shōjo" (閃光少女; "Flash Girl") (also known by its English title "Put Your Camera Down") is a song by the Japanese band Tokyo Jihen. It was released on November 16, 2007, as a promotional track from their vinyl extended play Variety Zōkangō and music video clips DVD Senkō Shōjo, and was later added to their 2010 album Sports.

== Background and development ==
The song was released directly after Variety (2007), an album where the other band members other than Ringo Sheena served as the songwriters. The cover work is in the same style as Variety and its singles "OSCA" and "Killer-tune." Previously, Seiji Kameda had worked on the songs "Superstar" and "Tōmei Ningen" from Adult (2006), and "Shiseikatsu" from Variety.

== Writing and production ==
The song featured lyrics written by Ringo Sheena, and music by Seiji Kameda. It was recorded during sessions for Variety, and was performed during their Spa & Treatment tour in October and November 2007. It was originally titled "Hood" (フード) during demo sessions. Kameda was inspired to write the song after seeing a pre-teen girl walking home late at night, with her jacket hood up. Kameda wondered what her future would be like, and created the melody for the song. The first version recorded was "Put Your Camera Down," an English version with lyrics written by Robbie Clark That version was later featured on the Variety Zōkangō vinyl, as well as on the Senkō Shōjo DVD credits. It was eventually released to CD in 2013, on Tokyo Jihen's Hard Disk box set.

== Promotion and release ==
The song was used in commercials for Subaru's Stella cars from November 2007 onwards. The band performed the song at Music Station on November 30, 2007.

"Senkō Shōjo" is featured on Tokyo Jihen's Spa & Treatment live concert DVD, which was released on March 26, 2010. It was also performed during their Ultra C tour (released August 24, 2010), their Discovery tour (released February 25, 2012) and their farewell tour Bon Voyage (released on June 13, 2012). The band additionally performed the song at the Rising Sun Rock Festival (2008), Society of the Citizens Vol. 2 (2008), Countdown Japan (2009) and the Terebi Asahi Dream Music Festival (2011). The Spa & Treatment performance of the song was included on the live compilation album Tokyo Collection, released in 2012.

== Critical reception ==
CDJournal reviewers noted the song's "cheerful beat", and noted the song's message of appreciating the now. Listenmusic reviewer Yoshiki Aoyuki noted the song's as being simultaneously alternative rock and pop.

== Track listing ==
Digital download
No.	Title	Lyrics	Music	Length
1.	"Senkō Shōjo"	Ringo Sheena	Seiji Kameda	2:59
Total length:				2:59

Put Your Camera Down digital download
No.	Title	Lyrics	Music	Length
1.	"Put Your Camera Down"	R. Sheena	S. Kameda	4:06
Total length:				4:06

== Chart rankings ==
Charts (2007)	Peak position
Japan RIAJ monthly ringtones	22
Japan RIAJ yearly PC downloads	28

=== Certifications ===
Chart	Certifications
RIAJ cellphone downloads	Gold (100,000+)
RIAJ PC downloads	Gold (100,000+)

== Release history ==
Region	Date	Format	Distributing Label
Japan	October 18, 2007	Ringtone, cellphone digital download	EMI Music Japan
Japan	November 16, 2007	PC digital download	EMI Music Japan
Japan	February 27, 2013	"Put Your Camera Down" digital download	EMI Music Japan
South Korea	March 25, 2013	"Put Your Camera Down" digital download	Universal Music Korea
