= Dai Hakken =

Studio album by Tokyo Jihen
- Released: June 29, 2011
- Genres: Rock; pop; jazz
- Length: 50:44
- Labels: EMI Music Japan (distributor); Virgin Music (label)
- Producers: Uni Inoue, Tokyo Jihen

Tokyo Jihen chronology
Sports (2010)	Dai Hakken (2011)	Color Bars (2012)

Singles from Dai Hakken
- 1. "Tengoku e Yōkoso" Released: July 21, 2010; 2. "Dopa-mint!" Released: July 28, 2010; 3. "Sora ga Natteiru" Released: February 8, 2011; 4. "Onna no Ko wa Dare Demo" Released: April 20, 2011

Dai Hakken (大発見; literally great discovery) is the fifth studio album by Japanese rock band Tokyo Jihen, released on June 29, 2011 in Japan through EMI Music Japan and Virgin Music. The album was produced by the band and Japanese recording engineer Uni Inoue.

== Background ==
In this album, the characters making up the song titles are aligned in all songs except for the additional English words in the first and last song, as well as the additional seven characters on track 7. Ringo Sheena's tradition of symmetrically matching song titles written in Kanji, Hiragana and Latin characters throughout the album, however, was broken for this record. Some of the songs with French titles share titles with films.

== Track listing ==
Credits adapted from Ringo Sheena's website.

All lyrics are written by Sheena except "Regardez-moi" by Ukigumo; all tracks arranged and performed by Tokyo Jihen except "Fly Me to Heaven" arranged by Takayuki Hattori and performed by the Tokyo Magical Big Band.

No.	Title	Music	Length
1.	"Where's Heaven for the Disc" (天国へようこそ for the Disc Tengoku e yōkoso)	Sheena	3:01
2.	"Relative vs. Absolute" (絶対値対相対値 Zettai-chi tai sōtai-chi)	Ichiyō Izawa; Sheena	3:01
3.	"Atarashii Bunmei Kaika"	Izawa; Sheena	4:31
4.	"City Without Electricity" (電気のない都市 Denki no nai toshi)	Izawa	4:17
5.	"Regardez-moi" (海底に巣くう男 Kaitei ni sukuu otoko)	Ukigumo	4:09
6.	"Jeux interdits" (禁じられた遊び Kinji rareta asobi)	Izawa; Sheena	4:00
7.	"Dopa-Mint!" (ドーパミント！BPM 103 Dōpaminto!)	Izawa	2:44
8.	"Les adultes terribles" (恐るべき大人達 Osorubeki otona-tachi)	Seiji Kameda; Sheena	4:39
9.	"Child of the 21st Century Universe" (21世紀宇宙の子 21 Seiki uchū no ko)	Kameda; Izawa	3:22
10.	"Un homme et une femme" (かつては男と女 Katsute wa otoko to on'na)	Ukigumo	3:31
11.	"Reverberation" (空が鳴っている Sora ga natte iru)	Kameda	3:59
12.	"Go With the Wind" (風に肖って行け Kaze ni ayakatte ike)	Izawa	2:36
13.	"Fly Me to Heaven" (女の子は誰でも On'nanoko wa dare demo)	Sheena	3:53
14.	"Where's Heaven for the Tube" (天国へようこそ for the Tube; bonus track)	Sheena	3:01
Total length:			50:44

== Charts and certifications ==
=== Charts ===
Chart (2011)	Peak Position
Japan Oricon Daily Albums Chart	1
Japan Oricon Weekly Albums Chart	1
Japan Oricon Monthly albums chart	6
Japan Oricon yearly albums chart	48
Japan iTunes Store yearly Albums Chart	25

=== Sales and certifications ===
Country	Provider	Sales	Certification
Japan	RIAJ	133,000	Gold
