= Sports (Tokyo Jihen album) =

Sports スポーツ

Studio album by Tokyo Jihen
- Released: February 24, 2010
- Recorded: 2009
- Genre: Rock; funk; synthpop; R&B
- Length: 47:14
- Label: EMI Music Japan (Distributor); Virgin Music (Label); Gold Typhoon
- Producer: Uni Inoue, Tokyo Jihen

Tokyo Jihen chronology
Variety (2007)	Sports スポーツ (2010)	Dai Hakken (2011)

Singles from Sports
- 1. "Senkō Shōjo" Released: November 21, 2007 (digital download); 2. "Nōdōteki Sanpunkan" Released: December 2, 2009 (CD, digital download); 3. "Sweet Spot" Released: February 8, 2010 (digital download)

Professional ratings
Review scores
Source	Rating
The Japan Times	(positive)
Rolling Stone Japan	4/5 stars

Sports (スポーツ, Supōtsu) is the fourth studio album by Japanese rock band Tokyo Jihen, released on February 24, 2010 in Japan through EMI Music Japan and Virgin Music. The album was produced by the band and Japanese recording engineer Uni Inoue.

On December 10, 2010, it was announced that "Sports" was named the iTunes Rewind 2010 Best Album of the Year in Japan.

== Background ==
This is the first Tokyo Jihen album since 2007's Variety and marks vocalist Ringo Sheena’s return to composing for the band. In 2008, Sheena worked on a string of releases to celebrate her 10th anniversary since her solo debut, such as a B-side collection, a singles box set and a string of concerts. In 2009, she released a new single, "Ariamaru Tomi", and an original album, Sanmon Gossip.

== Recording and production ==
Tokyo Jihen wrote the album with the intention of displaying different sports through the music and lyrics. Band members got together, each bringing some demos which they had created imaging sports. They built instrumentation from demos in the recording studio and Sheena put words on them, with the exception of Ukigumo's tracks.

== Release and promotion ==
The first single released from the album was "Senkō Shōjo." It was released as a digital download in November 2007, two months after the release of their third album, Variety. It was written and recorded in the Variety sessions. The second single, "Nōdōteki Sanpunkan," was released three months before the album, in December 2009. Both singles had commercial tie-ups. "Senkō Shōjo" was used in Subaru Stella car commercials, and "Nōdōteki Sanpunkan" was used in an Ezaki Glico Watering KissMint gum commercial, featuring Sheena as the spokesperson.

"Denpa Tsūshin", "Season Sayonara" and "Kachiikusa" were released in Chaku-uta and Chaku-Uta Full format prior to the album. "Kachiikusa" was used for the second batch of Watering KissMint commercials. It was released to radio, as well as cellphone download, on 16 January. It reached #30 on the Billboard Japan Hot 100 and #58 on the RIAJ Digital Track Chart Top 100. The band later performed this song on Music Station, a week before the album's release.

"Sweet Spot" was released as a digital download on iTunes on 8 February. It reached #13 on the Billboard Japan Hot 100 the week of the album's release.

Tokyo Jihen embarked on an all-country promotional concert tour, "Ultra C" (ウルトラC), in March 2010.

== Track listing ==
Credits adapted from Ringo Sheena's website.

All lyrics are written by Sheena and translated into English by Robbie Clark and Mika Arata except where noted; all tracks arranged by Tokyo Jihen.

No.	Title	Lyrics	Music	Length
1.	"Vivre" (生きる Ikiru)		Ichiyō Izawa	5:26
2.	"Put Your Antenna Up" (電波通信 Denpa Tsūshin)		Izawa	3:24
3.	"Season Sayonara" (シーズンサヨナラ Shīzun Sayonara)	Ukigumo	Ukigumo	3:38
4.	"Win Every Fight" (勝ち戦 Kachi Ikusa)		Sheena	3:28
5.	"Foul"	Ukigumo	Ukigumo	2:31
6.	"Life Will Be Held Even If It Rains" (雨天決行 Utenkekkō)		Izawa	2:49
7.	"3 min." (能動的三分間 Nōdōteki Sanpunkan)		Sheena	3:00
8.	"Life May Be Monotonous But the Sun Shines" (絶体絶命 Zettai Zetsumei)		Izawa; Sheena	3:06
9.	"Fair"		Ukigumo	3:55
10.	"Ride Every Wave" (乗り気 Noriki)		Izawa	2:51
11.	"Sweet Spot" (スイートスポット Suītosupotto)		Sheena; Izawa	3:50
12.	"Put Your Camera Down" (閃光少女 Senkō Shōjo)		Seiji Kameda	2:59
13.	"Adieu" (極まる Kimaru)	Ukigumo	Ukigumo	6:17

Notes:

- "Season Sayonara" and "Sweet Spot" are stylized as "Season SAYONARA" and "SWEET Spot," respectively.
- "Foul" and "Fair" are stylized in all uppercase.

== Personnel ==
=== Tokyo Jihen ===
- Ringo Sheena – vocals
- Ukigumo – electric guitars and acoustic guitars, backing vocals
- Ichiyo Izawa – keyboard instruments, synthesizers, electric guitars on "Senkō Shōjo"
- Seiji Kameda – bass
- Toshiki Hata – drums, percussion

=== Additional personnel ===
- Makoto Minagawa – synthesizers on "Senkō Shōjo"

== Charts and certifications ==
=== Charts ===
Chart (2011)	Peak Position
Japan Oricon Daily Albums Chart	1
Japan Oricon Weekly Albums Chart	1
Japan Oricon Monthly albums chart	6
Japan Oricon yearly albums chart	48
Japan iTunes Store yearly Albums Chart	6

=== Sales and certifications ===
Country	Provider	Sales	Certification
Japan	RIAJ	177,000	Gold

== Content and structure ==
Track list symmetry
01. 生きる; Vivre	13. 極まる; Adieu
02. 電波通信; Put Your Antenna Up	12. 閃光少女; Put Your Camera Down
03. シーズンサヨナラ; Season SAYONARA	11. スイートスポット; SWEET Spot
04. 勝ち戦; Win Every Fight	10. 乗り気; Ride Every Wave
05. FOUL; FOUL	09. FAIR; FAIR
06. 雨天決行; Life Will Be Held; Even If It Rains	08. 絶体絶命; Life May Be Monotonous; But The Sun Shines
07. 能動的三分間; 3 min.

The album, much like many of Sheena's solo works and the band's previous albums (such as Shōso Strip, Adult), features a symmetrical track list. Tracks are paired to another in title length, type of script and placement of grammatical particles. The official English titles given in the album's booklet also follow this theme (occasionally receiving non-direct translations to fit the theme).

"Ikiru" and "Kimaru" are both plain-form verbs with a single kanji (in fact, the standard reading of "極まる" is "kiwamaru"). Both songs end with a band arrangement and begin with a sparsely arranged section.

"Denpa Tsūshin" and "Senkō Shōjo" are both songs with four kanji in their titles. Both deal with electricity in some way.

"Season Sayonara" and "Sweet Spot" are both written in katakana. Both titles feature two words that begin with s sounds.

"Kachiikusa" and "Noriki" are both set phrases associated with sports. Both are continuative verb/noun compounds, with two kanji and one hiragana character.

"F.O.U.L." and "F.A.I.R." are both English words in Latin script. Unlike some previous pairs, such as "Meisai" and "Ishiki" which name the paired song in the lyrics, neither song is named in "F.A.I.R." (but both are named in "F.O.U.L.").

"Utenkekkō" and "Zettai Zetsumei" are four kanji compounds that are set phrases associated with sports.

In the vein of Kalk Samen Kuri no Hana and Sanmon Gossip, the central song with no paired track was the leading promotional song ("Nōdōteki Sanpunkan").

== Release history ==
Country	Release date
Japan	February 24, 2010
Taiwan	March 26, 2010
