= Color Bars (EP) =

EP by Tokyo Jihen
- Released: January 18, 2012 (Japan)
- Genre: Avant-pop
- Length: 21:20
- Labels: Toshiba EMI (Distributor); Virgin Music (Label)
- Producers: Uni Inoue, Tokyo Jihen

Tokyo Jihen chronology
Dai Hakken (2011)	Color Bars (2012)	Tokyo Collection (2012)

Color Bars (カラーバー) is an EP by Japanese rock band Tokyo Jihen, released on January 18, 2012, in Japan through EMI Music Japan and Virgin Music. The album was produced by the band and Japanese recording engineer Uni Inoue.

The first press edition is a cardboard sleeve.

== Background ==
The album's cover art is a combination of many "color bars", which is a representation of SMPTE color bars. They suggested the end of the band by it, since color bars fill the telescreen after all the TV programs for the day finish in Japan.

This mini album, intended to be the band's final studio release, includes one song written by each band member, including Toshiki Hata's first composition for the band and the first time Seiji Kameda wrote lyrics for his own song. In addition, the lead vocals on "Kai Horror Dust" and "Honto no Tokoro" were provided by the songs' respective composers, while Ringo Shiina played drums on the latter track. As in Dai Hakken, each song title is made up of seven characters.

== Track listing ==
No.	Title	Writer(s)	Lead vocals	Length
1.	"Kon'ya wa Karasawagi (Official European language title: Beaucoup de Bruit pour Rien)"	Ringo Shiina	Ringo Shiina	3:42
2.	"Kai horādasuto (怪ホラーダスト, Mysterious Horror Dust) ( Official European language title: Horror Dust)"	Ichiyō Izawa	Ichiyō Izawa	3:40
3.	"Taimu Kapuseru (タイムカプセル, Time Capsule) (Official European language title: Time Capsule)"	Seiji Kameda	Ringo Shiina	4:17
4.	"sa_i_ta (ｓａ＿ｉ＿ｔａ, bloomed) (Official European language title: sa_i_ta)"	Ukigumo	Ukigumo & Ringo Shiina	5:29
5.	"Honto no Tokoro (ほんとのところ, Actually) (Official European language title: Honto no Tokoro)"	Toshiki Hata	Toshiki Hata	4:12
Total length:				21:20

All the official European language titles according to Ringo Shiina's website.

== Charts and certifications ==
=== Charts ===
Chart (2012)	Peak Position
Japan Oricon Daily Albums Chart	1
Japan Oricon Weekly Albums Chart	2
Japan Oricon Monthly albums chart	5
Japan Soundscan Weekly Albums Chart	2

=== Sales and certifications ===
Country	Provider	Sales	Certification
Japan	RIAJ	108,000	Gold
