= Nōdōteki Sanpunkan =

Single by Tokyo Jihen

from the album Sports
- B-side: "Gaman"
- Released: November 17, 2009
- Recorded: 2009
- Genre: Alternative rock, funk
- Length: 3:00
- Label: EMI Music Japan
- Songwriter: Ringo Sheena
- Producer: Tokyo Jihen

Tokyo Jihen singles chronology
"Senkō Shōjo" (2008)	"Nōdōteki Sanpunkan" (2009)	"Tengoku e Yōkoso" (2010)

"Nōdōteki Sanpunkan" (能動的三分間; "Active Three Minutes"), also known by its English name "3min.", is a single by Japanese rock band Tokyo Jihen, led by musician Ringo Sheena. The song was the band's first release in two years, and was used in a commercial campaign for Ezaki Glico's Watering KissMint brand of gum, featuring Sheena as its spokesperson, and was known for its use of the moonwalk dance in the commercial and music video. The song was released on December 2, 2009, three months before the band's fourth album Sports.

== Background and development ==
In 2007, Tokyo Jihen released their third album, Variety, an album which featured members other than vocalist Sheena composing music, compared to the band's first two albums. During the two years in between this release and the band's 2007 tour Spa & Treatment, each member was involved in their own personal projects outside of the band, and the band did not meet often. They first met to discuss the Sports album in late 2008.

In 2008 to celebrate her 10th anniversary, Sheena held three concerts at the Saitama Super Arena, Sheena Ringo (Nama) Ringo-han '80: Jūshūnen kin'en-sai. In 2009, Sheena released a solo album entitled Sanmon Gossip, and as well as a single called "Ariamaru Tomi", which was used as the drama Smile's theme song. The members of Tokyo Jihen wrote and performed songs for Rie Tomosaka's come-back album Toridori., which was released on June 24, 2009.

"Nōdōteki Sanpunkan" was first announced on Tokyo Jihen's official website on October 16, 2009.

== Writing and production ==
"Nōdōteki Sanpunkan"
The song's interacting vocals and funk sound were highly praised by Japanese critics.

Sheena and Tokyo Jihen considered "Nōdōteki Sanpunkan" a theme song for the new sound that the band was developing after Variety. Sheena wrote and composed the song as a method to practice techniques for their upcoming releases. As such, she wrote the song using songwriting techniques that were the most natural to her, without thinking of how her audience would receive it.

For the endroll of Sheena's solo music video collection DVD Seiteki Healing: Sono Yon (2009), director Yuichi Kodama created an animated version of Sheena, performing the moonwalk, a dance popularised by American musician Michael Jackson. As the animated Sheena was performing this, she felt the need to learn the dance herself, so created "Nōdōteki Sanpunkan" in order to practice this. Sheena was unsure why moonwalking was featured in the release, but felt that it was to do with Jackson's death in June 2009. After the band's Spa & Treatment tour in 2007, Sheena wanted the band to have a great change in sound. Sheena considered techniques she wanted to use in the upcoming album that she wanted the band-members to master, and inserted these into "Nōdōteki Sanpunkan". The band members found these techniques difficult, to the point where Sheena was considering giving up on the composition before the band managed to record it.

The song from the demo stages had the conventions of being exactly three minutes in length, and having a BPM of 120. The song's synthesiser and male backing vocal portions also did not change since from the original demo. The backing vocals are sung by all of the band members, and were set in a vocal range that was the most comfortable range for guitarist Ukigumo to sing. Ukigumo himself did not feel like a vocalist, but agreed to sing, as part of the Sports project was for the band to not deny any new experiences. The key in which Sheena's vocals are sung were raised by four notes from the original demo.

The lyrics of the song begin and end with English stanzas, however are mostly sung in Japanese. The first stanza talks about making instant ramen noodles, which Sheena did not add for any particular reason, other than their link to three minutes. The lyrics talk about somebody recovering from grief, and making the decision to move on with their lives in the three minutes.

The B-side "Gaman" was a song written by pianist Ichiyo Izawa, with lyrics by Sheena. After Sheena had announced the album's Sports theme in December 2008, "Gaman" was the first song Izawa finished, around December 2008/January 2009. Izawa considers the song's tempo to be what make it sporty. He asked Sheena to write the lyrics in Kansai dialect, something she had never done before, as he thought it would sound cute. Sheena felt there was something in the song that was strifeful, so used that as the theme to the lyrics.

In 2011, Sheena wrote a second song with the same 120BPM and three minute conventions called "Ketteiteki Sanpunkan", created for entertainer Chiaki Kuriyama.

== Promotion and release ==
Shiina moonwalking in the Watering KissMint commercial.

The song was used in commercials for Ezaki Glico's range of Watering KissMint gum, which first aired on November 17, 2009. These were the first commercials in Sheena's career to feature her personally as a spokesperson. The commercial features Sheena in a historical Western building, the previous offices of bureaucrat Rizaemon Minomura in Fukagawa, Tokyo. It shows a close up of Sheena as she eats the gum, as well as scenes of her moonwalking back towards a sofa. Director Yuichi Kodama directed both the commercial and the music video for the song.

The song was performed on television twice: Music Station on November 27, and Count Down TV on December 5. As a part of the band's concerts, the song was performed during three tours: Ultra C (2010), Discovery (2011) and Bon Voyage (2012). The band additionally performed it at the Countdown Japan (2009), EMI Rocks (2010) and the Terebi Asahi Dream Music Festival (2011) events. The B-side "Gaman" was performed at their Countdown Japan performance, and on the Ultra C tour.

To promote the single, the band were featured in issues of magazines Rockin' On Japan and Switch.

== Music video ==
Shiina moonwalking in the music video.

The music video was first unveiled on November 17, 2011, and was made available for streaming from the band's website. It was directed by Yuichi Kodama, who also directed the Watering KissMint commercials. The video was shot over the course of an entire day, with shooting beginning in the early morning and lasting until the late evening.

The video features four different indoor scenes of Sheena performing the song. As she performs the song, the video switches between each scene. As each scene was shot with Sheena performing the same actions, her movements are in synch in each scene. Each individual scene also features a single band member of Tokyo Jihen performing alongside her. During the video, the members of Tokyo Jihen perform the moonwalk, a dance also featured in the Watering KissMint commercials. Several scenes feature stopwatches and wristwatches, while the left side of the video frame features four digital timestamps constantly moving.

The music video and commercial's moonwalk dance were originally director Kodama's idea, who had added an animation of Sheena moonwalking in the ending credits of her solo DVD Seiteki Healing: Sono Yon. After viewing the animation, Sheena felt compelled to learn the dance for herself, and created the song in order to practice this. One scene features Sheena angrily throwing a bouquet of flowers at Izawa. The original plan for this scene involved Ukigumo being the recipient, however it was changed on the day of filming.

At the 2010 Space Shower Music Video Awards, the video was nominated for the Best Conceptual Video category. Sheena's video for "Tsugō no Ii Karada" from her solo album Sanmon Gossip was also nominated for the Best Female Video category. While the video lost to Sakanaction's "Native Dancer" music video, "Tsugō no Ii Karada" won its award, and Sheena won the overall Best Artist award. Director Kodama was also awarded the overall Best Director award.

== Critical reception ==
Critical reception to the song was unanimously positive, with Vibe-Net's Naoko Fukuda calling it "a perfect three minutes in pop music". Haruna Takegawa of Hot Express praised the song's "stylish groove sound and bewitching vocals" along with the band's evolving style, and felt there was something instinctively good about the song, instead of merely technically or cerebrally. Rockin' On Japan's Hirokazu Koike liked the "catchy disco style" of the song, and praised how the backing vocals interacted with the song as it developed. CDJournal reviewers gave the single a star of recommendation, likening the song's "1970s soul shine and thick funk" to Sly Stone and Curtis Mayfield. The reviewers felt the lyrics were particularly Sheena-like, praising the "bewitchingly sung funk beat", Ukigumo's chorus work, and how the song ended perfectly in three minutes. Yoshiki Aoyuki of Listenmusic praised the song as being stimulating and radical, describing it as a "sensuous and stoic upper funk tune", and noting how will it added to the Watering KissMint moonwalking commercials. Reviewer Mikio Yanagisawa described the song as "pure and bewitching funk", praising the guitar-work and backing vocals.

For the B-side "Gaman", CDJournal reviewers found the song "thrilling", "experimental and stimulating", noting the change from new wave rock to Latin jazz. They further praised Ukigumo's guitar-work during the song's introduction, and Sheena's Kansai dialect lyrics. Aoyuki of Listenmusic described the song as "a number exploding with alternative rock guitar". He felt dumbstruck when the song developed into the "Brazilian music-like" section, and felt the Kansai dialect cursing and the "roaring guitar" worked well together. Yanagisawa felt the development was "intense", and believed the strongly worded Kansai dialect lyrics gave the song "the smell of leather".

== Track listing ==
No.	Title	Lyrics	Music	Length
1.	"Nōdōteki Sanpunkan"	Ringo Sheena	R. Sheena	3:00
2.	"Gaman" (我慢 "Endure")	R. Sheena	Ichiyo Izawa	3:33
Total length:				6:33

== Personnel ==
Personnel details were sourced from "Nōdōteki Sanpunkan"'s liner notes booklet.

Visuals and imagery

- Yutaka Kimura – jacket design, advertisements
- Ryōji Inagaki – hair and make-up for Ringo Sheena
- Ryōji Ōtani – hair and make-up for men
- Yuko Sugiyama – styling
- Shoji Uchida – photography

Musicians, personnel and production

- Yumi Fujikura – assistant engineer
- Junichiro Fujinami – assistant engineer
- Toshiki Hata – drums
- Uni Inoue – recording engineer, mixing engineer
- Ichiyo Izawa – keyboards
- Seiji Kameda – bass
- Shigeo Miyamoto – mastering engineer
- Ringo Sheena – vocals
- Ryō Takagi – executive producer
- Tokyo Jihen – producers
- Ukigumo – guitar

== Charts and sales ==
Weekly chart performance for "Nōdōteki Sanpunkan"
Chart (2009–10)	Peak position
Japan Billboard Adult Contemporary Airplay	1
Japan Billboard Japan Hot 100	1
Japan Billboard yearly Japan Hot 100	44
Japan Oricon daily singles	1
Japan Oricon weekly singles	1
Japan RIAJ Digital Track Chart	7
Taiwan G-Music East Asian weekly chart	16

Annual chart rankings for "Nōdōteki Sanpunkan"
Chart (2010)	Rank
Japan Adult Contemporary (Billboard)	41

=== Sales and certifications ===
Chart	Amount
Oricon physical sales	71,000
RIAJ cellphone downloads	Gold (100,000+)
RIAJ PC downloads	Gold (100,000+)

== Release history ==
Region	Date	Format	Distributing Label	Catalogue codes
Japan	November 17, 2009	Ringtone, cellphone download	EMI Music Japan	
Japan	December 2, 2009	CD, rental CD, PC download	EMI Music Japan	TOCT-40280
South Korea	December 3, 2009	Digital download	EMI	
Taiwan	December 4, 2009	CD	Gold Typhoon	I5165
