= Yuichi Kodama =

Japanese video director (born 1975)

- 児玉裕一
- Born: August 20, 1975 (age 51); Niigata, Niigata Prefecture, Japan
- Education: Tohoku University (Department of Chemistry)
- Occupation: Video director
- Spouse: Ringo Sheena
- Children: 2

Yuichi Kodama (児玉裕一, Kodama Yuichi; born August 20, 1975), is a Japanese video director. He has mainly directed music videos and ads. He often produces music videos and ads that are strongly connected or "tied-up" to each other, such as Perfume's "Secret Secret" and Morinaga Milk's "Eskimo Pino", or Amuro Namie's songs and Vidal sassoon's ads.

In 2008, he won 3 awards in the Cannes International Advertising Festival, 4 awards in the Clio Awards and 3 awards in the One Show Interactive for a project he did for UNIQLOCK. Kodama is an alumnus of Tohoku University.

== Personal life ==
In September 2013, gossip magazine Josei Jishin published an article that linked Kodama romantically with singer Ringo Sheena and stating that Sheena has secretly given birth to his first and Sheena's second child. Sheena addressed these rumours publicly during her Tōtaikai concerts in November 2013, announcing that she gave birth in spring of 2013 to a daughter. As this was close to the release of her single "Irohanihoheto/Kodoku no Akatsuki," she did not feel it was appropriate to link the birth of their daughter with her single promotions, so she decided not to announce it at the time. The footage of her announcement was released on her Tōtaikai DVD in March 2014.

== Music videos ==
=== 2025 ===
- Ringo Sheena – "La velada legendaria" "Under Experiment" "Este nuevo problema" "Fair and Square"

=== 2024 ===
- Number_i – "GOAT"

=== 2022 ===
- Ed Sheeran – "Celestial"
- Hikaru Utada – "Somewhere Near Marseilles ―マルセイユ辺りー -LIVE at Sea Paradise"

=== 2020 ===
- Fujii Kaze – "Kaerou"

=== 2019 ===
- Ken Ishii - "Bells of New Life"

=== 2018 ===
- Perfume - "Future Pop"

=== 2017 ===
- Wednesday Campanella - "Ikkyu-san"

=== 2015 ===
- Ringo Sheena - "No verão, as noites / God, nor Buddha"
- Perfume - "Pick Me Up"

=== 2011 ===
- Tokyo Jihen - "Sora ga Natteiru"
- Tokyo Jihen - "Onna no Ko wa Daredemo"

2010

- Nanba Shiho - "Gomen ne, Watashi"
- Perfume - "Natural ni Koishite" "Nee"
- salyu - "Extension"

=== 2009 ===
- Sakanaction - "Native Dancer"
- Ringo Sheena - "Tsugou no Ii Karada"
- Sawa - "Swimming Dancing"

=== 2008 ===
- Perfume - "Secret Secret"
- Ringo Sheena -"Mellow"
- Midorikawa Shobo -"Dare Yorimo Anata wo"
- Polysics - "Pretty good"
- Sawa - "ManyColors"
- Base Ball Bear - "17 sai" "changes"
- Mr.Children "Esora" filmed with Morimoto Chie, as "Kodama goen゜"
- Radwimps - "Order Made"
- Amuro Namie - "New Look"

=== 2007 ===
- POLYSICS - "Catch On Everywhere" "Hard Rock Thunder"
- Tokyo Jihen "OSCA" "Killer Tune" "Senkou Shoujo"
- Base Ball Bear - "Ai Shiteru"
- bird - "SPARKLES"
- M-Flo and Crystal Kay - "Love Don't Cry"
- Rip Slyme - "I.N.G"
- Your Song Is Good - "Aitsu ni Yoroshiku"
- Hitomitoi - "Konayuki no Spur"
- Rekishi - "Rekishi Brand-new Day"
- Midorikawa Shobo "Oh! G men" "Koi ni Ikiru Hito""Kouetsu no Hito"

=== 2006 ===
- Base Ball Bear - "Electric Summer" "Girlfriend" "Matsuri no Ato"
- Polysics - Electric Surfin' Go Go" "I My Me Mine"
- Midorikawa Shobo "I am a mother" "Ringo Girl"
- Go! Go! 7188 "Kinkyori Renai"
- Ishino Takkyu - "Siren"
- Captain Straydum - "Fusen Gum"

=== 2005 ===
- Quruli - "Birthday"
- Ando Yuko - "Samishigariya no Kotobatachi"
- Chemistry -"Wings of Words"
- Suneo Hair - "Waltz"
- Midorikawa Shobo - "Kao 2005" "Sorezore ni Shinjitsu ga Aru"

=== 2004 ===
- Midorikawa Shobo -"Baka Kyodai" "Hokenshitsu no Sensei"
- Dreams Come True - "Ola! Vitoria!"
- Yuki - "Hello Goodbye"

=== 2003 ===
- Suneo Hair - "Uguisu" "Fuyu no Tubasa" "Over the River" "Communication "Seikou Toutei" "Pinto"

=== 2002 ===
- Suneo Hair - "Wake mo Shiranaide" "Ivory" "Jimon Jidou"

== Ads ==
Only particularly notable ones are mentioned:

2010

- Ezaki Glico - "Waterring Kiss Mint Gum" featuring Tokyo Jihen - "Kachi Ikusa"

2009

- McDonald Japan ”Quarter Pounder” featuring Amuro Namie
- P&G -Vidal Sassoon "Bourgeois Gorgeous" featuring Amuro Namie - "Dr."
- Uniqlo - "Uniqlock" Season 5

2008

- Morinaga Milk -"Eskimo Pino" featuring Perfume - "Secret Secret"
- Uniqlo - "Uniqlock" Season 2,3,4
- Kanebo - Kate "Confusion"
- P&G - Vidal Sassoon "Fashion×Music×VidalSasoon 60s" featuring Amuro Namie - "New Look"

2007

- Uniqlo - Uniqlock blog parts
- NEC - "FOMA N904i"
- Sony - VAIO Entermercial(entertainment+commercial), featuring Rip Slyme - "I.N.G"

2006

- Nintendo：Bit Generation
- Keio Corporation - "Akai Densha Akai Futari" featuring Quruli - "Akai Densha"

== Filmography ==
- Kuso-yarō to Utsukushiki Sekai (2018)
