= List of songs recorded by Ringo Sheena =

Japanese singer-songwriter Ringo Sheena, as a solo musician, has recorded material for eight albums, as well as for various non-traditional albums, singles and side projects. Sheena debuted as a musician in 1998 with the single "Kōfukuron," and released her debut studio album Muzai Moratorium in 1999. She followed this with her second album Shōso Strip and the three-CD single set Ze-Chyou Syuu in 2000. During this period she toured extensively, and formed several bands to perform her concerts. One of these, the girls band Hatsuiku Status, performed entirely new compositions for their concert.

In November 2000, Sheena married guitarist Junji Yayoshi, who was a member of her backing band Gyakutai Glycogen, and released the single "Mayonaka wa Junketsu" while pregnant. She gave birth to a son in July 2001. After a break of over a year, she released a two-CD cover album set called Utaite Myōri: Sono Ichi, in which she collaborated with many famous vocalists, such as Masamune Kusano from Spitz and singer Hikaru Utada. She released her third studio album in 2003, titled Kalk Samen Kuri no Hana.

In 2004, Sheena formed the band Tokyo Jihen, which became her primary musical unit. In 2007 she resumed her solo career to release Heisei Fūzoku, a soundtrack album collaborating with conductor Neko Saito for the film Sakuran. She returned once again in 2009 to release the single "Ariamaru Tomi" and the album Sanmon Gossip for her 10th anniversary year. In 2011, she released the single "Carnation," which acted as the eponymous theme song for the morning drama Carnation.

In 2012, after the break-up of her band Tokyo Jihen, she released the digital single "Jiyū e Michizure" for the drama Ataru. In 2013, to celebrate the 15th anniversary of her debut single, she released the single "Irohanihoheto" / "Kodoku no Akatsuki," followed by the compilation albums Ukina (which compiled her collaborations with other musicians) and Mitsugetsu-shō, a live recording compilation. On her 16th anniversary, she will release Gyakuyunyū: Kōwankyoku, an album composed of covers of songs Sheena had written for musicians during her career.

Since her debut, Sheena has occasionally collaborated with other musicians, most notably Soil & "Pimp" Sessions, with whom she recorded "My Foolish Heart" and "Koroshiya Kiki Ippatsu." Other collaborators include Takashi Taniguchi, her brother Junpei Sheena, Zazen Boys, Mo'some Tonebender, Maboroshi, Rekishi, Towa Tei and Tomita Lab.

This list features every song Sheena has performed in her solo career, as well as any bands associated with her solo career, such as Hatsuiku Status or Yokoshima, but excludes Tokyo Jihen songs.

== Songs ==
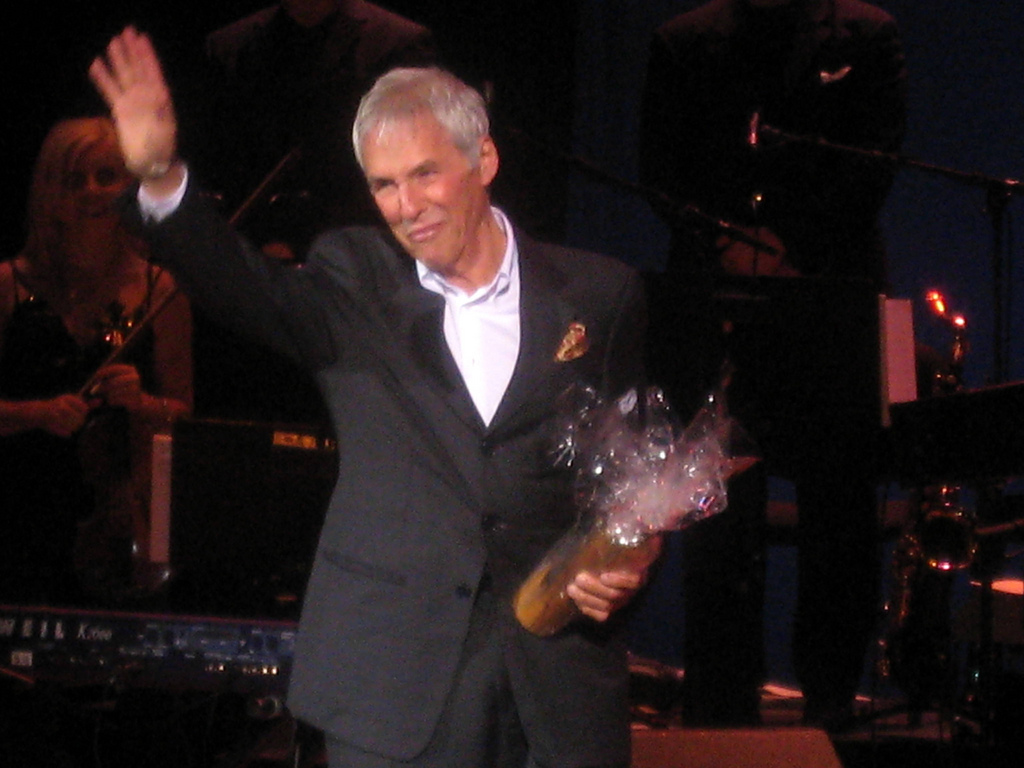
Burt Bacharach wrote the song "It Was You" for Sheena.

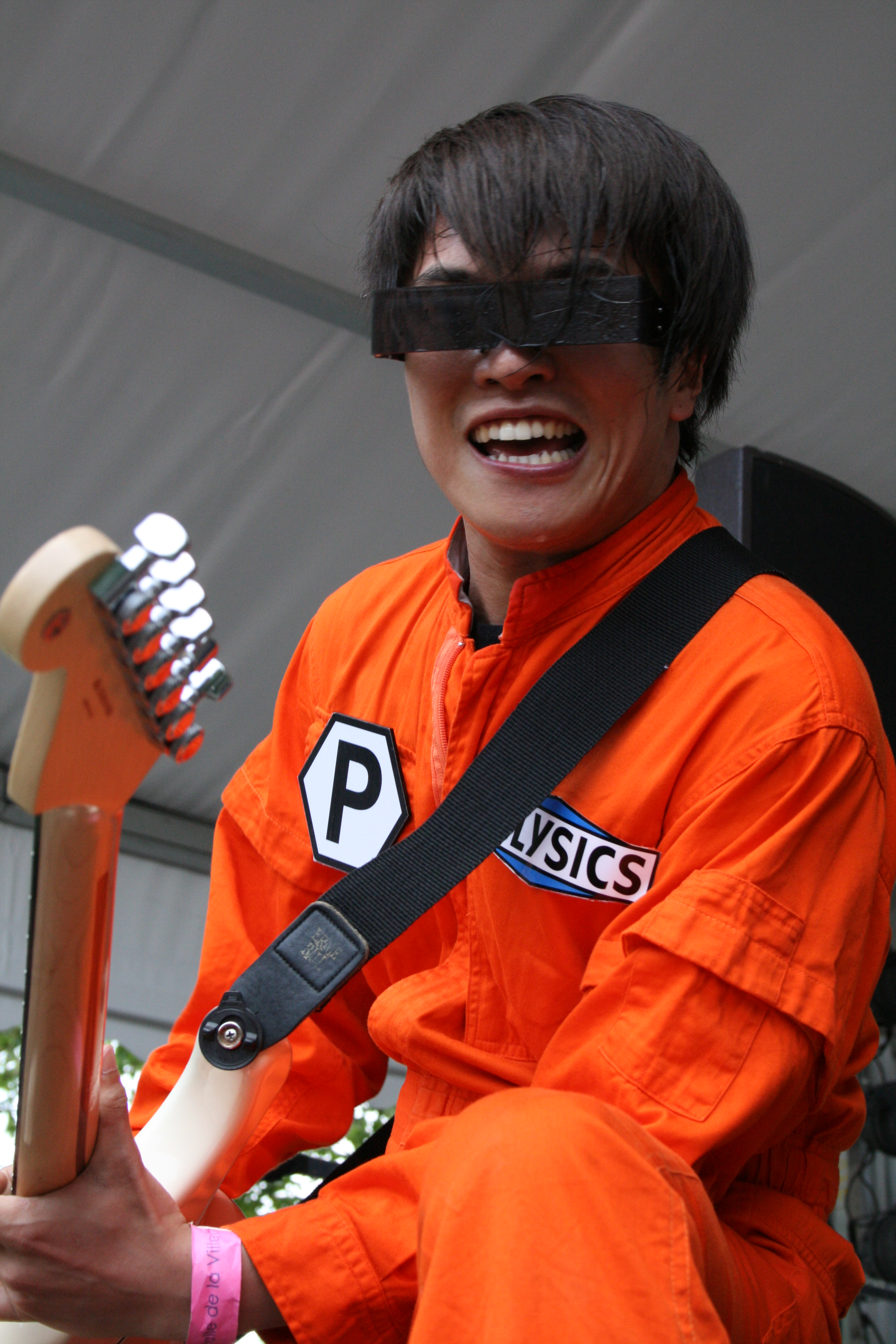
Hiroyuki Hayashi of the band Polysics performed guitars on the song "Jiyū e Michizure."

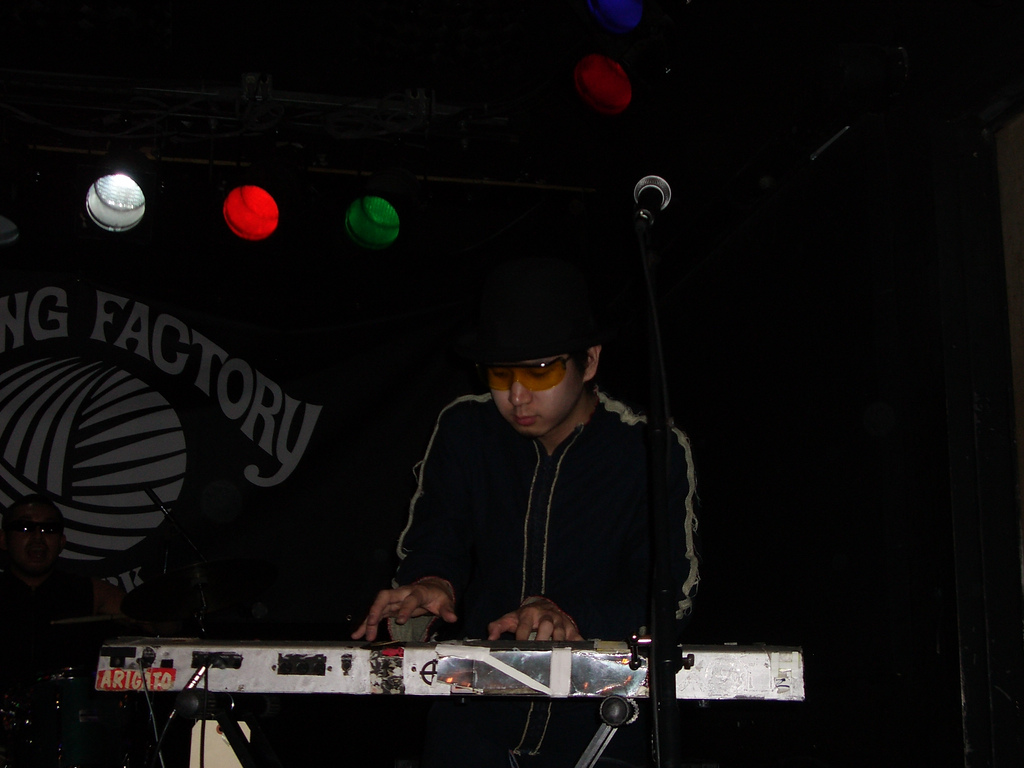
Masayuki Hiizumi, former member of Tokyo Jihen, arranged the song "Ryūkō".

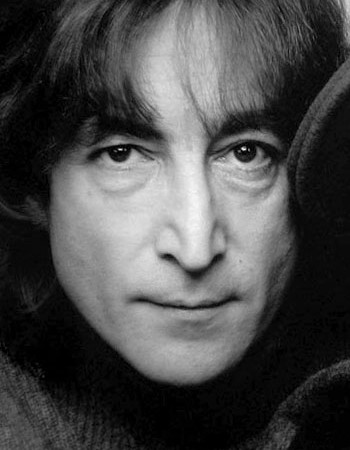
John Lennon wrote two songs Sheena has covered, "Starting Over" (1980) and "Yer Blues" (1968).

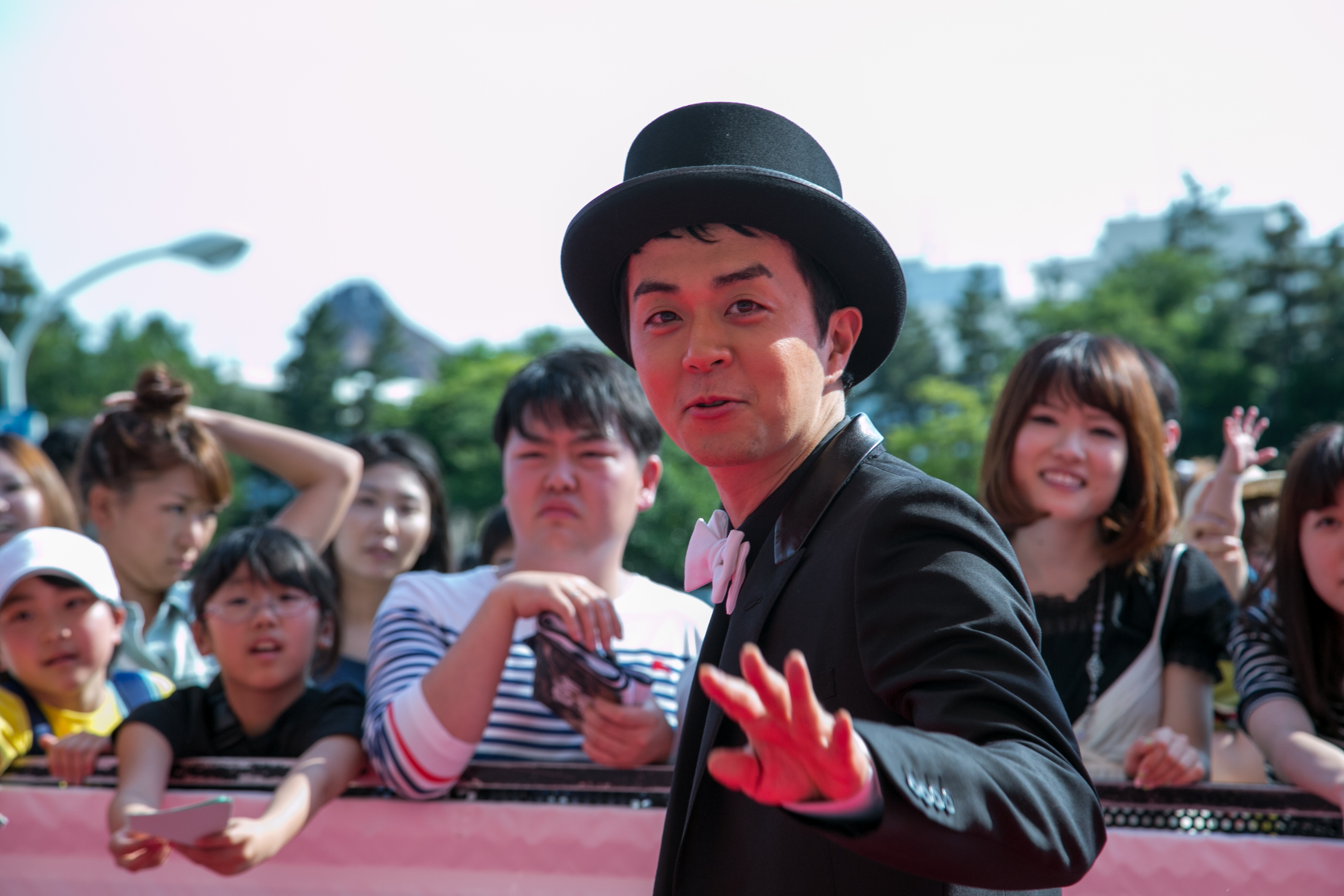
Kenichi Maeyamada arranged the song "Private" for Gyakuyunyū.

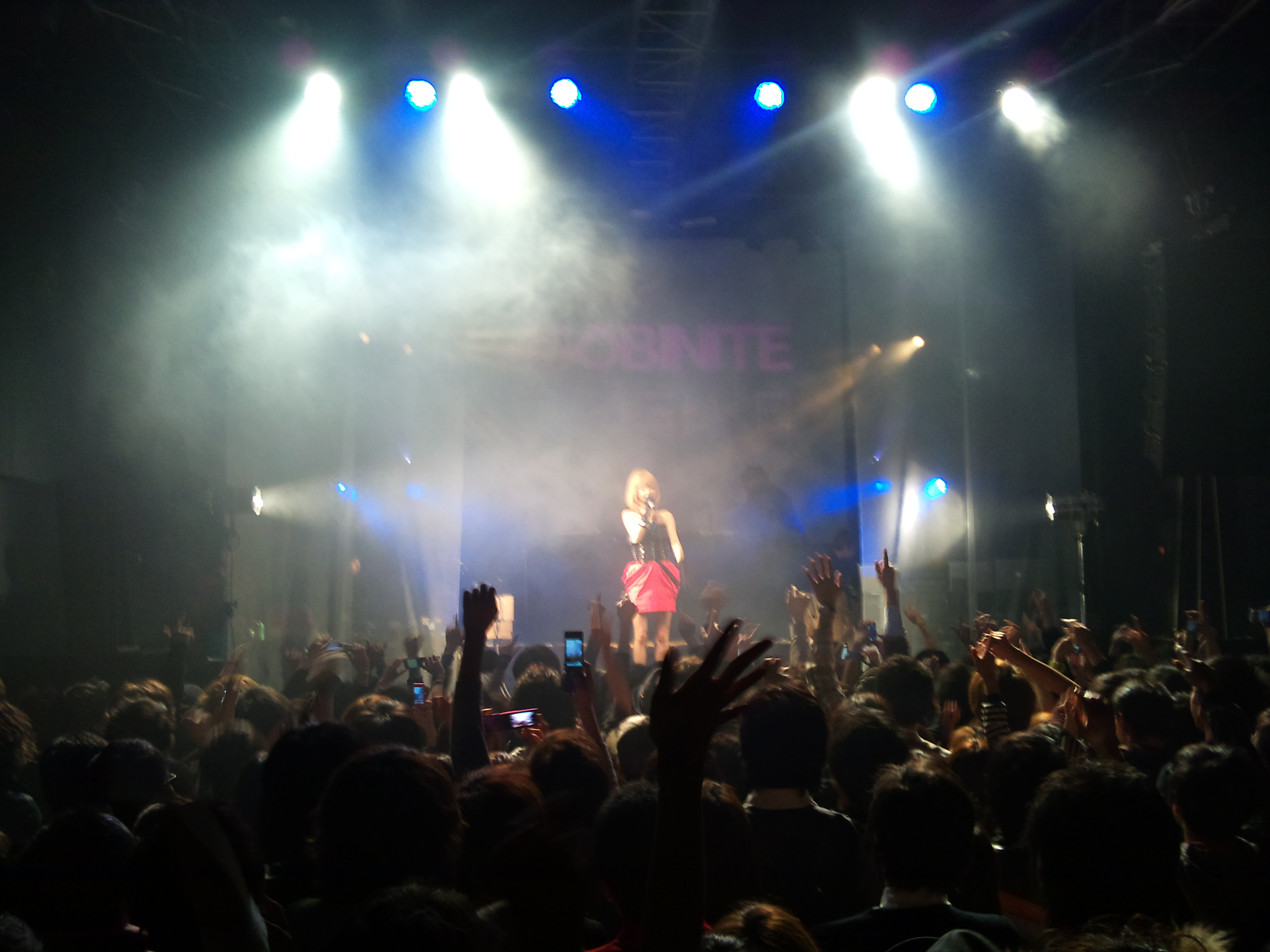
Yasutaka Nakata, member of electronic band Capsule, arranged "Netsuai Hakkakuchū".

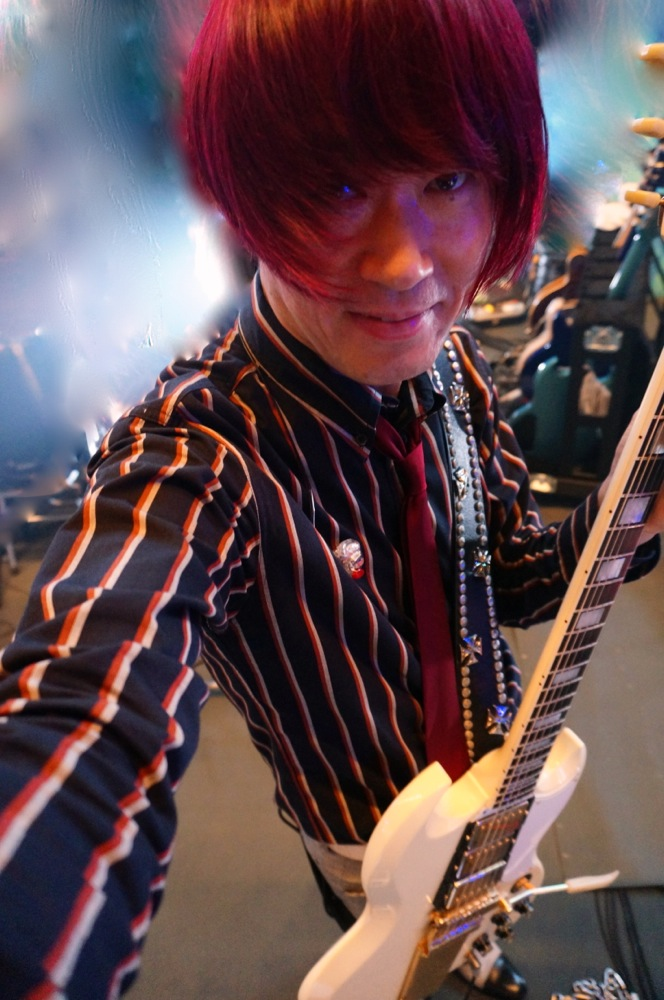
Susumu Nishikawa performed electric guitars on many songs from Muzai Moratorium and Shōso Strip.

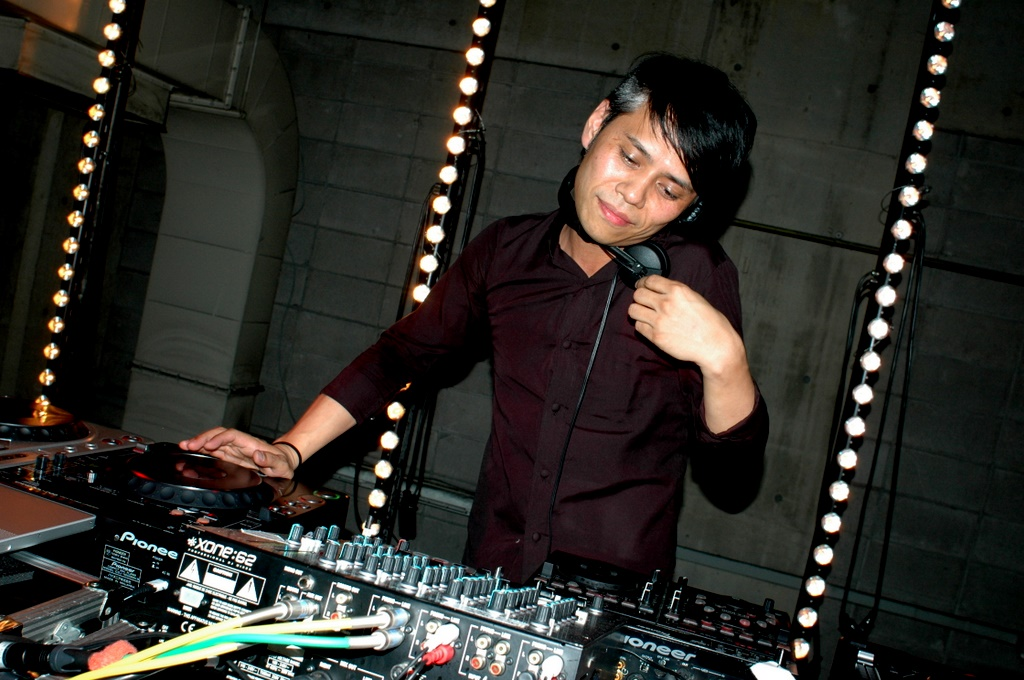
Shinichi Osawa arranged the song "Manatsu no Datsugokusha" for Gyakuyunyū.

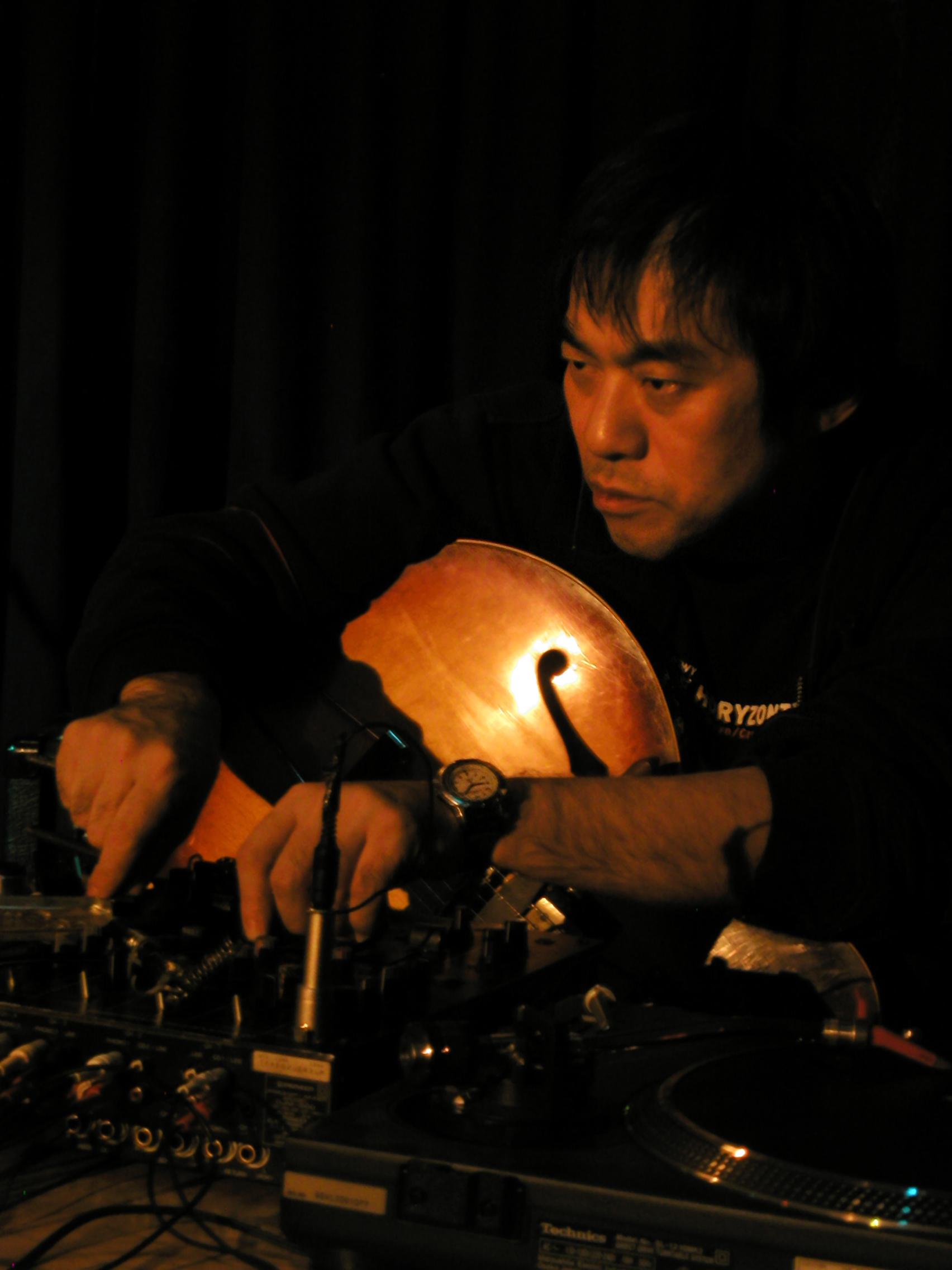
Otomo Yoshihide arranged the song "Shuen no Onna" for Gyakuyunyū.

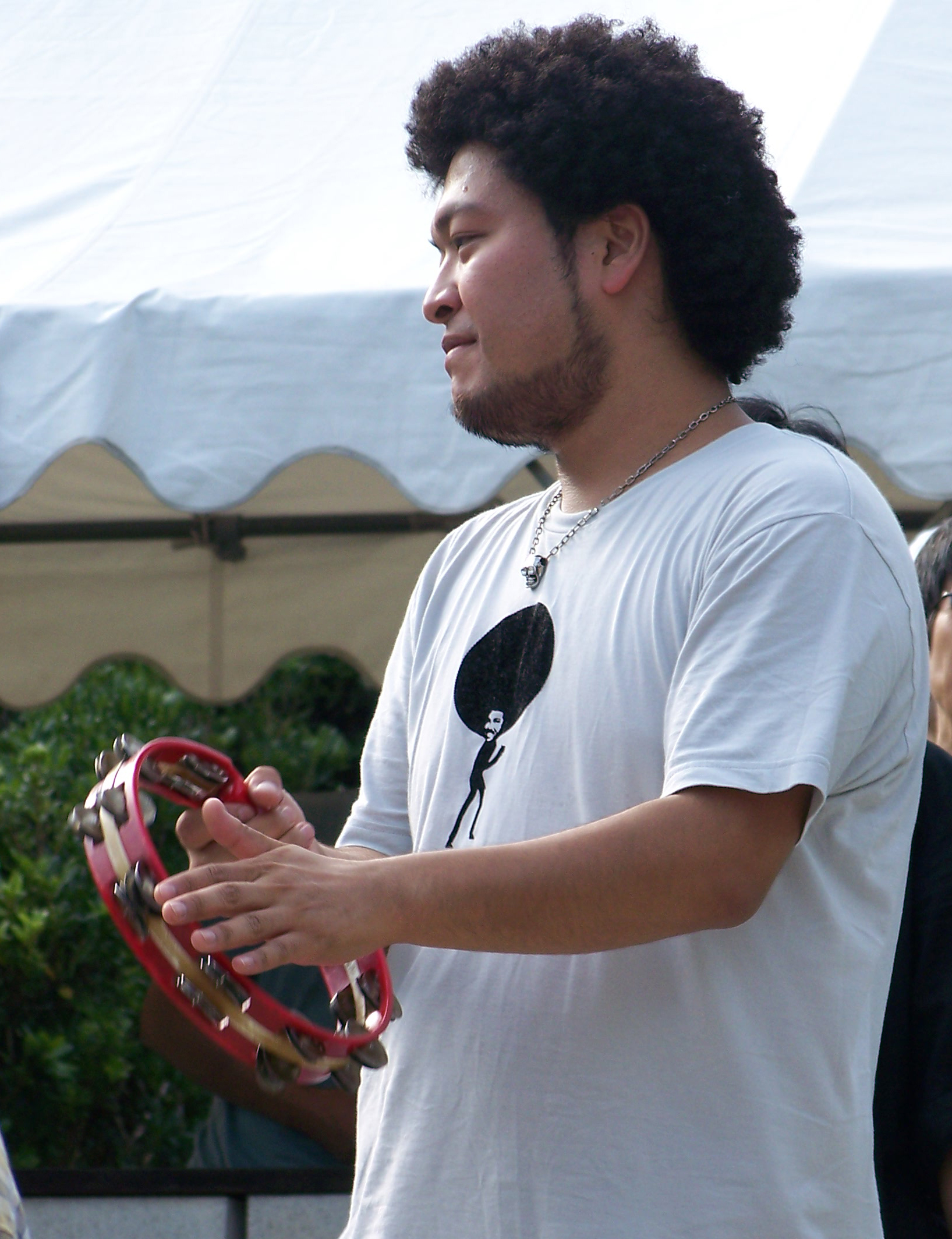
Midorin, drummer for Soil & "Pimp" Sessions, who collaborated on the tracks "Karisome Otome," "Koroshiya Kiki Ippatsu," "Mayakashi Yasaotoko" and "My Foolish Heart."

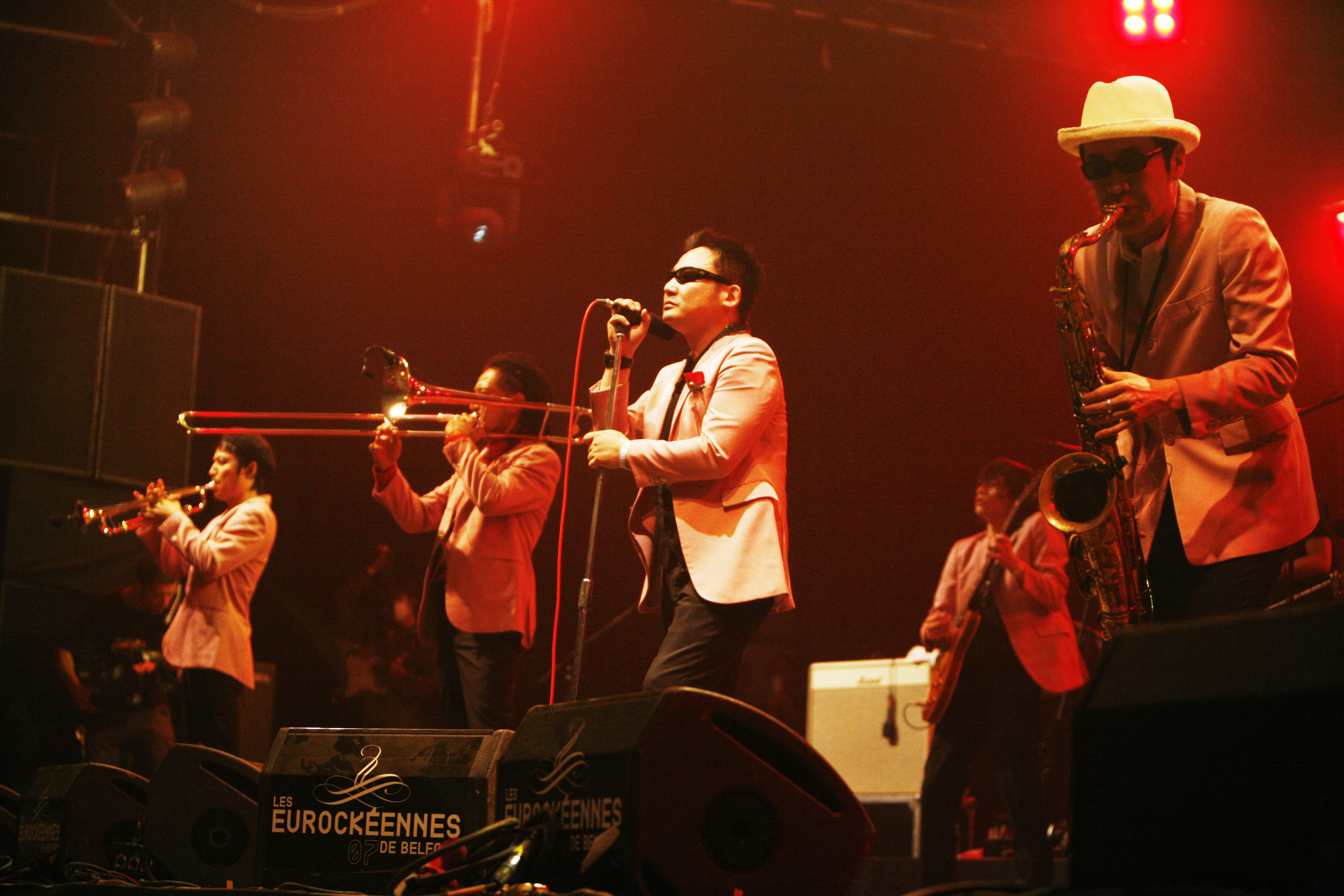
Tokyo Ska Paradise Orchestra collaborated with Sheena for the single "Mayonaka wa Junketsu."

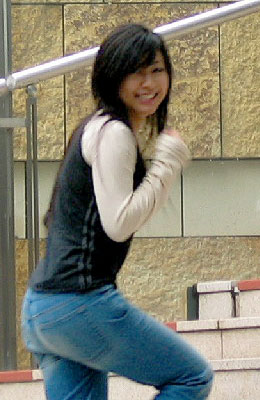
Hikaru Utada collaborated with Sheena for the song "I Won't Last a Day Without You," featured on Utaite Myōri: Sono Ichi (2002).

Key
†	Indicates single release
‡	Indicates song performed in concert and released on DVD, but not recorded in studio
#	Indicates promotional single release

Song name	Artist(s)	Writer(s)	Originating album(s)	Year	Ref.
"17"	Ringo Sheena	Ringo Sheena	"Tsumi to Batsu" (single)	2000	
"Aisaika no Chōshoku" (愛妻家の朝食, "Devoted Husband's Breakfast")	Ringo Sheena	Ringo Sheena	"Mayonaka wa Junketsu" (single)	2001	
"Akane Sasu, Kiro Terasaredo..." (茜さす 帰路照らされど・・・, "The Crimson Sun Still Shines on My Way Back, But...")	Ringo Sheena	Ringo Sheena	Muzai Moratorium	1999	
"Amagasa" (Note: Originally performed by Tokio in 2008.)	Ringo Sheena	Ringo Sheena	Gyakuyunyū: Kōwankyoku	2014	
"Amai Yamai" (あまいやまい, "Sweet Sickness")	Maboroshi featuring Ringo Sheena	Daisuke Sakama, Ringo Sheena, Tomoyasu Takeuchi	Maboroshi no Shi	2009	
"Anminbō" (安眠棒, "Stick of Peaceful Sleep")	Zazen Boys	Shutoku Mukai	Zazen Boys II	2004	
"Aozora" (あおぞら, "Blue Sky")	Ringo Sheena	Ringo Sheena	"Honnō" (single)	1999	
"Apple"	Towa Tei with Ringo Sheena	Towa Tei	Lucky	2013	
"Ariamaru Tomi" (ありあまる富, "Excessive Wealth") †	Ringo Sheena	Ringo Sheena, Tomotaka Imamichi	Hi Izuru Tokoro	2009	
"Arikitari na Onna" (ありきたりな女, "An Ordinary Woman") #	Ringo Sheena	Ringo Sheena	Hi Izuru Tokoro	2014	
"Becoming"	Takashi Taniguchi	Takashi Taniguchi, Katsuya Yuki	Becoming	1998	
"Benkai Debussy" (弁解ドビュッシー, "Excuse Debussy")	Ringo Sheena	Ringo Sheena	Shōso Strip	2000	
"Between Today and Tomorrow" #	Ringo Sheena	Ringo Sheena	Ukina	2012	
"Blackout" (ブラックアウト, Burakkuauto) (Note: Originally performed with her band Tokyo Jihen on their album Adult in 2006.) ‡	Ringo Sheena	Ringo Sheena	Ringo Expo 08	2009	
"Bōenkyō no Soto no Keshiki" (望遠鏡の外の景色, "View Outside of the Telescope") (Note: Originally performed by Eri Fukatsu in 2012.)	Ringo Sheena	Hideki Noda, Ringo Sheena	Gyakuyunyū: Kōwankyoku	2014	
"Bonsai Hada" (凡才肌, "Love Affair")	Ringo Sheena	Ringo Sheena	Sanmon Gossip	2009	
"Byōshō Public" (病床パブリック, "Sickbed Public")	Ringo Sheena	Ringo Sheena	Shōso Strip	2000	
"Cappuccino" (Note: Originally performed by Rie Tomosaka in 1999.)	Ringo Sheena	Ringo Sheena	Gyakuyunyū: Kōwankyoku	2014	
"Carnation" (カーネーション, Kānēshon) †	Ringo Sheena	Ringo Sheena	Hi Izuru Tokoro	2011	
"Chichinpuipui" (ちちんぷいぷい)	Ringo Sheena	Ringo Sheena	Hi Izuru Tokoro	2014	
"Chiisa na Kinomi" (小さな木の実, "Tiny Berries")	Ringo Sheena	Hiroshi Unno, Bizet	Utaite Myōri: Sono Ichi	2002	
"Crazy Days Crazy Feeling"	Zazen Boys	Shutoku Mukai	Zazen Boys II	2004	
"Crazy for You"	Ringo Sheena	John Bettis, Jon Lind	Senkō Ecstasy	2013	
"Delayed Brain" ‡	Ringo Sheena	Shutoku Mukai	Electric Mole	2003	
"Doppelganger" (ドッペルゲンガー, Dopperugengā)	Ringo Sheena	Ringo Sheena	Kalk Samen Kuri no Hana	2003	
"Dynamite" (ダイナマイト, Dainamaito) (Note: Originally covered with her band Tokyo Jihen on the "Sōnan" single in 2004.) ‡	Ringo Sheena x Neko Saito	Tom Glazer, Mort Garson	Dai Ikkai Ringohan Taikai no Moyō	2007	
"Fly Me to the Moon" ‡	Ringo Sheena x Kiyoshi Hasegawa + Maki	Bart Howard	Dai Ikkai Ringohan Taikai no Moyō	2007	
"Fukō Jiman" (不幸自慢, "Unhappy Pride")	Ringo Sheena	Ringo Sheena	Ze-Chyou Syuu	2000	
"Fukurande Kichatta" (膨らんできちゃった, "It Expanded") ‡	Ringo Sheena	Ringo Sheena	Ze-Chyou Syuu	2000	
"Futari-bocchi Jikan" (二人ぼっち時間, "Just Us Time")	Ringo Sheena	Ringo Sheena	Sanmon Gossip	2009	
"Gaichū Kujo" (害虫駆除, "Pest Control") ‡	Ringo Sheena	Ringo Sheena	Hatsuiku Status: Gokiritsu Japon	2000	
"Georgy Porgy"	Yokoshima	David Paich		2002	
"Gamble" (ギャンブル, Gyanburu) (Note: First performed at the Gekokujyo Xstasy tour, live version released on Ze-Chyou Syuu. The studio version was released on Heisei Fūzoku (2007).)	Ringo Sheena	Ringo Sheena	Ze-Chyou Syuu	2000	
"Gips" †	Ringo Sheena	Ringo Sheena	Shōso Strip	2000	
"Haenuki" (生え抜き, "Born and Raised") ‡	Ringo Sheena	Ringo Sheena	Hatsuiku Status: Gokiritsu Japon	2000	
"Haihai" (はいはい, "Crawling") ‡	Ringo Sheena	Ringo Sheena, Junko Murata, Hisako Tabuchi, Yasunobu Torii, Yuka Yoshimura	Ze-Chyou Syuu	2000	
"Haiiro no Hitomi" (灰色の瞳, "Grey Eyes")	Ringo Sheena featuring Masamune Kusano (from Spitz)	Tito Veliz, Tokiko Kato, Uña Ramos	Utaite Myōri: Sono Ichi	2002	
"Hashire wa Number" (走れゎナンバー, "Go, the Rental Car")	Ringo Sheena	Ringo Sheena	Hi Izuru Tokoro	2014	
"Hatsuga" (発芽, "Germination") ‡	Ringo Sheena	Ringo Sheena	Hatsuiku Status: Gokiritsu Japon	2000	
"Hatsukoi Shōjo" (ハツコイ娼女, "First Love Girl")	Ringo Sheena x Neko Saito	Ringo Sheena	Heisei Fūzoku	2007	
"Hiyori Hime" (Note: Originally performed by Puffy AmiYumi on Bring It! (2009).)	Ringo Sheena	Ringo Sheena	Gyakuyunyū: Kōwankyoku	2014	
"Honnō" †	Ringo Sheena	Ringo Sheena	Shōso Strip	1999	
"Ichijiku no Hana" (映日紅の花, "Fig Flower") (Note: Found exclusively on the vinyl edition of Kalk Samen Kuri no Hana.)	Ringo Sheena	Ringo Sheena, Ukigumo	Kalk Samen Kuri no Hana	2003	
"Identity" (アイデンティティ, Aidentitī)	Ringo Sheena	Ringo Sheena	Shōso Strip	2000	
"Ima" (今, "Present") (Note: Originally performed during the Tōtaikai concerts and released on the video album in 2013 before the studio version.)	Ringo Sheena	Ringo Sheena	Hi Izuru Tokoro	2014	
"Irohanihoheto" (いろはにほへと) †	Ringo Sheena	Ringo Sheena	Hi Izuru Tokoro	2013	
"Irokoizata" (色恋沙汰, "Love Affair")	Ringo Sheena	Ringo Sheena	Sanmon Gossip	2009	
"Ishiki" (意識, "Consciously") (Note: Originally released on the "Stem" single as a different version called "Ishiki (Sengo Saidai-kyū no Bōfū-u Kennai Kashō)" (意識～戦後最大級ノ暴風雨圏内歌唱～, "Ishiki (A Song from One of the Greatest Rainstorms of the Post-war Era).") Re-arrangement released on Heisei Fūzoku in 2007.)	Ringo Sheena	Ringo Sheena	Kalk Samen Kuri no Hana	2003	
"It Was You" #	Ringo Sheena	Burt Bacharach, Tonio K	Ukina	2013	
"I Wanna Be Loved by You"	Ringo Sheena	Bert Kalmar, Herbert Stothart, Harry Ruby	Utaite Myōri: Sono Ichi	2002	
"I Won't Last a Day Without You" #	Ringo Sheena featuring Hikaru Utada	Roger Nichols, Paul Williams	Utaite Myōri: Sono Ichi	2002	
"Izon-shō" (依存症, "Drug Dependence")	Ringo Sheena	Ringo Sheena	Shōso Strip	2000	
"Jazz a Go-Go"	Ringo Sheena	Robert Gall, Alain Goraguer	Utaite Myōri: Sono Ichi	2002	
"Jinsei wa Omoidōri" (人生は思い通り, "Life Is How I Want It to Be")	Ringo Sheena	Ringo Sheena	"Carnation" (single)	2011	
"Jiyū e Michizure" (自由へ道連れ, "Traveling Companion to Freedom") †	Ringo Sheena	Ringo Sheena	Hi Izuru Tokoro	2013	
"JL005-bin de" (JL005便で, "On Flight JL005")	Ringo Sheena	Ringo Sheena	Hi Izuru Tokoro	2014	
"Kabukichō no Joō" †	Ringo Sheena	Ringo Sheena	Muzai Moratorium	1999	
"Kachū no Otoko" (渦中の男, "Vortex Boy") (Note: Originally performed by Tokio in 2008.)	Ringo Sheena	Ringo Sheena	Gyakuyunyū: Kōwankyoku	2014	
"Kageriyuku Heya" (翳りゆく部屋, "Darkening Room")	Ringo Sheena	Yumi Matsutoya	Dear Yuming	1999	
"Kareha" (枯葉, "Dry Leaves")	Ringo Sheena	Jacques Prevert, Joseph Kosma	Utaite Myōri: Sono Ichi	2002	
"Karisome Otome" (Note: Originally released as "Karisome Otome (Death Jazz Version)" with Soil & "Pimp" Sessions in 2006.) #	Ringo Sheena	Ringo Sheena	Heisei Fūzoku	2006	
"Keikoku" (警告, "Caution")	Ringo Sheena	Ringo Sheena	Muzai Moratorium	1999	
"Keshō Naoshi" (化粧直し, "Fix My Makeup") (Note: Originally performed with her band Tokyo Jihen on their album Adult in 2006.) ‡	Ringo Sheena x Kiyoshi Hasegawa + Maki	Ringo Sheena	Dai Ikkai Ringohan Taikai no Moyō	2007	
"Ketteiteki Sanpunkan" (Note: Originally performed by Chiaki Kuriyama in 2011.)	Ringo Sheena	Ringo Sheena	Gyakuyunyū: Kōwankyoku	2014	
"Kiken Sugiru" (危険すぎる, "Too Dangerous") †	Kenichi Asai	Kenichi Asai	Johnny Hell	2006	
"Kimi no Hitomi ni Koishiteru" (君ノ瞳ニ恋シテル, "Your Eyes Make Me Fall in Love")	Ringo Sheena	Bob Crewe, Bob Gaudio	"Tsumi to Batsu" (single)	2000	
"Kimi o Aisu" (君を愛す, "I Love You")	Ringo Sheena	Hans Christian Andersen, Edvard Grieg	Utaite Myōri: Sono Ichi	2002	
"Kirakira Bushi" (きらきら武士, "Shining Samurai") (Note: Performed under the synonym Deyonna.)	Rekishi featuring Deyonna	Takafumi Ikeda	Rekitsu	2011	
"Kodoku no Akatsuki" †	Ringo Sheena	Aya Watanabe, Ringo Sheena	Hi Izuru Tokoro	2013	
"Kōfukuron" †	Ringo Sheena	Ringo Sheena	Muzai Moratorium	1998	
"Kōgōsei" (光合成, "Photosynthesis") ‡	Ringo Sheena	Ringo Sheena, Hisako Tabuchi	Hatsuiku Status: Gokiritsu Japon	2000	
"Koko de Kiss Shite." †	Ringo Sheena	Ringo Sheena	Muzai Moratorium	1999	
"Komori Uta" (子守唄, "Lullaby")	Ringo Sheena	Ringo Sheena, Frédéric Chopin	Utaite Myōri: Sono Ichi	2002	
"Kono Yo no Kagiri" †	Ringo Sheena x Neko Saito + Junpei Shiina	Ringo Sheena	Heisei Fūzoku	2007	
"Kono Yo wa Fushigi" (この世は不思議, "This World Is Mysterious")	Tomita Lab featuring Yuko Hara, Ken Yokoyama, Ringo Sheena, Yu Sakai	Ringo Sheena, Keiichi Tomita	Joyous	2013	
"Kon'ya Dō" (今夜だふ, "How About Tonight?") ‡	Ringo Sheena	Ringo Sheena, Hisako Tabuchi	Hatsuiku Status: Gokiritsu Japon	2000	
"Koroshiya Kiki Ippatsu" †	Soil & "Pimp" Sessions featuring Ringo Sheena	Ringo Sheena, Tabu Zombie	Circles	2013	
"Kuroi Orfeu" (黒いオルフェ, Kuroi Orufe, "Black Orpheus")	Ringo Sheena	Luiz Bonfá, Antônio Maria de Araújo Morais, Francois Llenas, Marcel Camus, George David Weiss, Hugo Peretti, Luigi Creatore	Utaite Myōri: Sono Ichi	2002	
"Kyogen-shō" (虚言症, "Addicted to Lying") #	Ringo Sheena	Ringo Sheena	Shōso Strip	2000	
"Love Is Blind" (Note: First performed at the Gekokujyo Xstasy tour in 2000, with the title "Koi wa Mōmoku" (恋は盲目).)	Ringo Sheena	Janis Ian	Utaite Myōri: Sono Ichi	2002	
"Manatsu no Datsugokusha" (真夏の脱獄者, "Midsummer Fugitives") (Note: Originally performed by SMAP on Gift of SMAP (2012).)	Ringo Sheena	Ringo Sheena	Gyakuyunyū: Kōwankyoku	2014	
"Marunouchi Sadistic" (丸の内サディスティック, Marunouchi Sadisutikku) (Note: Rearranged in English as "Maru Sa" (㋚) and broadcast at her Ringo Expo 08 concert, recorded on her album Sanmon Gossip (2009) as a bonus track.)	Ringo Sheena	Ringo Sheena	Muzai Moratorium	1999	
"Mayakashi Yasaotoko" (マヤカシ優男, "Fake Fellow")	Ringo Sheena	Ringo Sheena	Sanmon Gossip	2009	
"Mikan no Kawa" (みかんの皮, "Mandarin Skin") (Note: Originally written when Sheena was 7.) ‡	Ringo Sheena	Ringo Sheena	Ringo Expo 08	2009	
"Minato Machi Jūsan Banchi" (港町十三番地, "Port Town 13th Street") ‡	Ringo Sheena	Miyuki Ishimoto, Gento Uehara	Electric Mole	2003	
"Mayonaka wa Junketsu" †	Ringo Sheena	Ringo Sheena	"Mayonaka wa Junketsu" (single)	2001	
"Mebana Yue Obana" (雌花 故 雄花, "Pistil Begets Stamen") ‡	Ringo Sheena	Ringo Sheena, Hisako Tabuchi	Hatsuiku Status: Gokiritsu Japon	2000	
"Meisai" (迷彩, "Camouflage") (Note: Originally released on the "Stem" single as a different version called "Meisai (Sengo Saidai-kyū no Bōfū-u Kennai Kashō)" (迷彩～戦後最大級ノ暴風雨圏内歌唱～, "Camouflage (A Song from One of the Greatest Rainstorms of the Post-war Era).") Re-arrangement released on Heisei Fūzoku in 2007.)	Ringo Sheena	Ringo Sheena	Kalk Samen Kuri no Hana	2003	
"Mellow" (メロウ, Merō)	Ringo Sheena	Ringo Sheena, Makoto Totani	Ze-Chyou Syuu	2000	
"Memai" (眩暈, "Vertigo")	Ringo Sheena	Ringo Sheena	"Koko de Kiss Shite." (single)	1999	
"Mittei Monogatari" (密偵物語, "Spy Story")	Ringo Sheena	Jack Brown, Ringo Sheena	Sanmon Gossip	2009	
"Momen no Handkerchief" (木綿のハンカチーフ, "Cotton Handkerchief") #	Ringo Sheena featuring Nao Matsuzaki	Takashi Matsumoto, Kyōhei Tsutsumi	Utaite Myōri: Sono Ichi	2002	
"More"	Ringo Sheena	Marcello Ciorciolini, Norman Newell	Utaite Myōri: Sono Ichi	2002	
"Morphine" (モルヒネ, Moruhine)	Ringo Sheena	Ringo Sheena	Muzai Moratorium	1999	
"Mr. Wonderful"	Ringo Sheena	Jerry Bock, George David Weiss, Larry Holofcener	Utaite Myōri: Sono Ichi	2002	
"My Foolish Heart" #	Soil & "Pimp" Sessions featuring Ringo Sheena	Ringo Sheena, Jōsei, Motoharu	6	2006	
"My Luxury Night" (マイラグジュアリーナイト, Mai Ragujuarī Naito) ‡	Ringo Sheena	Etsuko Kisuki, Takao Kisugi	Zazen Ecstasy	2008	
"Netsuai Hakkakuchū" #	Ringo Sheena	Ringo Sheena	Ukina	2013	
"Nippon" †	Ringo Sheena	Ringo Sheena	Hi Izuru Tokoro	2014	
"Nippon ni Umarete" (日本に生まれて, "Born in Japan") (Note: Originally performed by Rie Tomosaka in 2000.) ‡	Ringo Sheena	Ringo Sheena	Zazen Ecstasy	2008	
"Nobara" (野薔薇, "Wild Roses")	Ringo Sheena	Johann Wolfgang von Goethe, Franz Schubert	Utaite Myōri: Sono Ichi	2002	
"Odaiji ni" (おだいじに, "Please Take Care")	Ringo Sheena	Ringo Sheena	Kalk Samen Kuri no Hana	2003	
"Oiran" (花魁, "Courtesan")	Ringo Sheena x Neko Saito	Ukigumo, Ringo Sheena	Heisei Fūzoku	2007	
"Oishii Kisetsu" (Note: Originally performed by Chiaki Kuriyama in 2011.) ‡	Ringo Sheena	Ringo Sheena	Tōtaikai	2014	
"Okonomi de" (おこのみで, "As You Wish")	Ringo Sheena	Ringo Sheena	Kalk Samen Kuri no Hana	2003	
"Omatsuri Sawagi" (御祭騒ぎ, "Festival Craziness") (Note: Originally performed with her band Tokyo Jihen on their album Kyōiku in 2004.) ‡	Ringo Sheena x Kiyoshi Hasegawa + Maki	Ringo Sheena	Dai Ikkai Ringohan Taikai no Moyō	2007	
"Onaji Yoru" (同じ夜, "Ordinary Night")	Ringo Sheena	Ringo Sheena	Muzai Moratorium	1999	
"Onna no Ko wa Dare Demo" (女の子は誰でも, "Every Girl") (Note: Originally performed with her band Tokyo Jihen on their album Dai Hakken in 2011.) ‡	Ringo Sheena	Ringo Sheena	Tōtaikai	2014	
"Papaya Mango" (パパイヤマンゴー, Papaiya Mangō) (Note: Originally covered during the Dai Ikkai Ringohan Taikai concerts in 2005, then released as a studio version on Heisei Fūzoku in 2007.)	Ringo Sheena x Neko Saito	Sid Wayne, Dee Libbey	Heisei Fūzoku	2007	
"Poltergeists" (ポルターガイスト, Porutāgaisuto) (Note: Rearrangement released on Heisei Fūzoku in 2007.)	Ringo Sheena	Ringo Sheena	Kalk Samen Kuri no Hana	2003	
"Private" (Note: Originally performed by Ryōko Hirosue in 1998.)	Ringo Sheena	Ringo Sheena	Gyakuyunyū: Kōwankyoku	2014	
"Remote Controller" (リモートコントローラー, Rimōto Kontorōrā)	Ringo Sheena	Ringo Sheena	"Koko de Kiss Shite." (single)	1999	
"Ringo Catalogue (Hokuro Jidai Saihensan)" (リンゴカタログ～黒子時代再編纂～, Ringo Katarogu (Hokuro Jidai Sanhensan), "A History of the Mole Era")	Ringo Sheena	Ringo Sheena	"Ringo no Uta" (single)	2003	
"Ringo no Uta" †	Ringo Sheena	Ringo Sheena	"Ringo no Uta" (single)	2003	
"Rinne Highlight" (輪廻ハイライト, Rinne Hairaito, "Transmigration Highlights")	Ringo Sheena	Ringo Sheena, Susanna Hoffs, Scott Cutler, David Kahne, Ross Rice	"Honnō" (single)	1999	
"Rock & Hammer"	Takashi Taniguchi	Takashi Taniguchi, Katsuya Yuki	Becoming	1998	
"Rockin' Luuula" (ロッキンルーラ, Rokkun Rūra)	Mo'some Tonebender	Kazuhiro Momo	Rockin' Luuula	2005	
"Rōdōsha" (労働者, "Laborer")	Ringo Sheena	Ringo Sheena	Sanmon Gossip	2009	
"Ryūkō" #	Ringo Sheena	Ringo Sheena, Mummy D	Sanmon Gossip	2009	
"Saisakizaka" (Note: Originally performed by Yōko Maki in 2013, First performed by Ringo Sheena at her Tōtaikai concerts in 2013.)	Ringo Sheena	Ringo Sheena	Gyakuyunyū: Kōwankyoku	2014	
"Sakana" (サカナ, "Fish")	Ringo Sheena	Ringo Sheena	Shōso Strip	2000	
"Sakasa ni Kazoete" (逆さに数えて, "Count Backwards")	Ringo Sheena	Ringo Sheena	"Nippon" (single)	2014	
"Sakasete Mite" (咲かせてみて, "Try Making It Bloom") ‡	Ringo Sheena	Ringo Sheena	Hatsuiku Status: Gokiritsu Japon	2000	
"Sakuran" (錯乱, "Confusion") (Note: Originally released on the "Kono Yo no Kagiri" single as "Sakuran (Onkio Version)".)	Ringo Sheena x Neko Saito	Ringo Sheena	Heisei Fūzoku	2007	
"Seishun no Matataki" (Note: Originally performed by Chiaki Kuriyama in 2011.) #	Ringo Sheena	Ringo Sheena	Gyakuyunyū: Kōwankyoku	2014	
"Sekidō o Koetara" (赤道を越えたら, "Crossing the Equator")	Ringo Sheena	Ringo Sheena	Hi Izuru Tokoro	2014	
"SG (Superficial Gossip)"	Ringo Sheena	Ringo Sheena	"Ariamaru Tomi" (single)	2009	
"Shiroi Kobato" (白い小鳩, "Little White Dove")	Ringo Sheena	Michio Yamagami, Shunichi Tokura	Utaite Myōri: Sono Ichi	2002	
"Shiroi Hana no Saku Koro" (白い花の咲く頃, "When the White Flowers Bloom") ‡	Ringo Sheena	Chisa Teruo, Shigeru Tamura	Electric Mole	2003	
"Shizuka Naru Gyakushū" (静かなる逆襲, "Quiet Counterattack")	Ringo Sheena	Ringo Sheena	Hi Izuru Tokoro	2014	
"Shōjo Robot" (Note: Originally performed by Rie Tomosaka in 2000.) ‡	Ringo Sheena	Ringo Sheena	Zazen Ecstasy	2008	
"Shuen no Onna" (主演の女, "Leading Lady") (Note: Originally performed by Puffy AmiYumi on Bring It! (2009).)	Ringo Sheena	Ringo Sheena	Gyakuyunyū: Kōwankyoku	2014	
"Shūkyō" (宗教, "Religion")	Ringo Sheena	Ringo Sheena	Kalk Samen Kuri no Hana	2003	
"Shun" #	Ringo Sheena	Ringo Sheena	Sanmon Gossip	2009	
"Sid to Hakuchūmu" (シドと白昼夢, "Sid and Daydreams") (Note: A differently arranged version appears on the "Mayonaka wa Junketsu" single.)	Ringo Sheena	Ringo Sheena	Muzai Moratorium	1999	
"Σ" (Sigma)	Ringo Sheena	Ringo Sheena	"Gips" (single)	2000	
"So Cold" (喪@CINコ瑠ヲュWァ, Sō Kōrudo) (Note: First performed at the Manabiya Ecstasy tour in 1999, with the title "So Cold" (喪興瑠怒).)	Ringo Sheena	Ringo Sheena	Ze-Chyou Syuu	2000	
"Sōretsu" (葬列, "Funeral")	Ringo Sheena	Ringo Sheena	Kalk Samen Kuri no Hana	2003	
"Spica" (スピカ, Supika) #	Ringo Sheena	Masamune Kusano (from Spitz)	Ichigo Ichie Sweets for my Spitz	2002	
"Starting Over"	Ringo Sheena	John Lennon	Utaite Myōri: Sono Ichi	2002	
"Stem" † (Note: Originally released on the "Stem" single as "Stem (Daimyō Asobi-hen)" (茎(STEM)～大名遊ビ編～, "Stem (The Daimyō's Fun Version)") in English. Different versions appear on Kalk Samen Kuri no Hana (2003) and Heisei Fūzoku (2007).)	Ringo Sheena	Ringo Sheena	Kalk Samen Kuri no Hana	2003	
"Stoicism" (ストイシズム, Sutoishizumu)	Ringo Sheena	Ringo Sheena	Shōso Strip	2000	
"Suberidai" (すべりだい, "Slide") #	Ringo Sheena	Ringo Sheena	"Kōfukuron" (single)	1998	
"Tadashii Machi" (正しい街, "The Right Town")	Ringo Sheena	Ringo Sheena	Muzai Moratorium	1999	
"Takai Takai" (たかいたかい, "High High") ‡	Ringo Sheena	Ringo Sheena, Junko Murata	Hatsuiku Status: Gokiritsu Japon	2000	
"Tamanegi no Happy Song" (玉葱のハッピーソング, Tamanegi no Happī Songu, "The Happy Onion Song")	Ringo Sheena featuring Junpei Shiina	Nickolas Ashford, Valerie Simpson	Utaite Myōri: Sono Ichi	2002	
"Togatta Teguchi" (尖った手口, "Sharp Trick")	Ringo Sheena featuring Mummy D	Ringo Sheena, Mummy D	Sanmon Gossip	2009	
"Tokai no Manners" (都会のマナー, Tokai no Manā, "Urban Manners") (Note: Originally performed by Rie Tomosaka on Toridori. (2009).) ‡	Ringo Sheena	Ringo Sheena	Tōtaikai	2014	
"Tokai no Yoru, Watashi no Machi" (都会の夜 わたしの街, "Urban Night, My Town")	Tomita Lab featuring Yuko Hara, Ken Yokoyama, Ringo Sheena, Yu Sakai	Ringo Sheena, Keiichi Tomita	Joyous	2013	
"Toki ga Bōsō Suru" (時が暴走する, "Time Drives Recklessly") (Note: Appears only on the 1999 re-release of the "Kōfukuron" single.)	Ringo Sheena	Ringo Sheena	"Kōfukuron" (single)	1999	
"Tokyo no Hito" (東京の女, "Tokyo Lady")	Ringo Sheena	Michio Yamagami, Kenji Sawada	"Gips" (single)	2000	
"Torikoshi Gurō" (とりこし苦労, "Worrying Unnecessarily")	Ringo Sheena	Ringo Sheena	Kalk Samen Kuri no Hana	2003	
"Tsugō no Ii Karada" (都合のいい身体, "A Perfect Body")	Ringo Sheena	Ringo Sheena	Sanmon Gossip	2009	
"Tsuki ni Makeinu" (月に負け犬, "Underdog and the Moon")	Ringo Sheena	Ringo Sheena	Shōso Strip	2000	
"Tsukiyo no Shōzō" (Note: Originally performed by Chiaki Kuriyama in 2011.) ‡	Ringo Sheena	Ringo Sheena	Tōtaikai	2014	
"Tsumiki Asobi" (積木遊び, "Playing with Blocks")	Ringo Sheena	Ringo Sheena	Muzai Moratorium	1999	
"Tsumi to Batsu" †	Ringo Sheena	Ringo Sheena	Shōso Strip	2000	
"Unconditional Love"	Ringo Sheena	Cyndi Lauper, Tom Kelly, Billy Steinberg	"Kabukichō no Joō" (single)	1998	
"Wakare no Samba" (別れのサンバ, "Farewell Samba") ‡	Ringo Sheena x Kiyoshi Hasegawa + Maki	Kiyoshi Hasegawa	Dai Ikkai Ringohan Taikai no Moyō	2007	
"Warui Nae Yoi Moe" (悪い苗 良い萠, "Bad Seeds, Good Sprouts") ‡	Ringo Sheena	Ringo Sheena, Junko Murata, Hisako Tabuchi, Yasunobu Torii, Yuka Yoshimura	Hatsuiku Status: Gokiritsu Japon	2000	
"Watashi no Aisuru Hito" (私の愛するひと, "My Love")	Ringo Sheena	Ringo Sheena	"Carnation" (single)	2011	
"Where Is the Love"	Junpei Shiina featuring Ringo Sheena	Ralph MacDonald, William Salter	Discover	2002	
"Yami ni Furu Ame" (闇に降る雨, "A Driving Rain in Darkness")	Ringo Sheena	Ringo Sheena	Shōso Strip	2000	
"Yasashii Tetsugaku" (やさしい哲学, "Kind Philosophy")	Tomita Lab featuring Ringo Sheena	Ringo Sheena, Keiichi Tomita	Joyous	2013	
"Yattsuke Shigoto" (やっつけ仕事, "Rush Job") (Note: First performed at the Gekokujyo Xstasy tour, live version released on Ze-Chyou Syuu. The studio version was released on Kalk Samen Kuri no Hana (2003).) #	Ringo Sheena	Ringo Sheena	Ze-Chyou Syuu	2000	
"Yer Blues"	Ringo Sheena	John Lennon, Paul McCartney	Utaite Myōri: Sono Ichi	2002	
"Yokushitsu" (浴室, "Bathroom") (Note: An English version called "La salle de bain" with lyrics by Robbie Clark was released on the DVD Seiteki Healing: Sono Yon (2003). A bilingual rearranged version was released on Heisei Fūzoku (2007).)	Ringo Sheena	Ringo Sheena	Shōso Strip	2000	
"Yokyō" (余興, "Entertainment") (Note: Originally performed at her Ringo Expo 08 concert. Studio version recorded on Sanmon Gossip in 2009.)	Ringo Sheena	Ringo Sheena	Ringo Expo 08	2009	
"You Make Me Feel So Bad"	Zazen Boys	Shutoku Mukai	Zazen Boys II	2004	
"Yume no Ato" (夢のあと, "A Scar of Dreams") (Note: Originally performed with her band Tokyo Jihen on their album Kyōiku in 2004. Covered during the Dai Ikkai Ringohan Taikai concerts in 2005, then released as a studio version on Heisei Fūzoku in 2007.)	Ringo Sheena x Neko Saito	Ringo Sheena	Heisei Fūzoku	2007	
"Zero Chiten Kara" (〇地点から, "From Point 0")	Ringo Sheena	Ringo Sheena	Sanmon Gossip	2009	

== Unreleased songs ==
Song	Artist(s)	Writer(s)	Leak	Ref.
"8823" (Hayabusa) (Spitz cover)	Ringo Sheena	Masamune Kusano	Yes	
"Alfie" (Burt Bacharach cover)	Ringo Sheena	Burt Bacharach, Hal David	Yes	
"Ano Ko o Mae ni Shite" (あのコを前にして, "Put that Kid in the Front")	Ringo Sheena	Ringo Sheena	Yes	
"Bokoku Jōcho" (母国情緒, "Homely Atmosphere") (Tokyo Jihen cover)	Ringo Sheena	Ringo Sheena	Yes	
"Creep" (Radiohead cover)	Ringo Sheena	Radiohead, Albert Hammond, Mike Hazlewood	Yes	
"Denaosu Kara" (出直すから, "Because You Make Me New")	Ringo Sheena	Ringo Sheena	Yes	
"Dōzo Konomama" (どうぞこのまま, "Here You Go, As It Is") (Keiko Maruyama cover)	Ringo Sheena	Keiko Maruyama	Yes	
"EMI" (Sex Pistols cover)	Ringo Sheena	Johnny Rotten, Steve Jones, Glen Matlock, Paul Cook, Sid Vicious	Yes	
"Girl" (ガール, Gāru)	Ringo Sheena	Ringo Sheena	Yes	
"How Are You?"	Ringo Sheena	Ringo Sheena	Yes	
"Ikenai Ko" (いけない子, "Bad Kid") (Rie Tomosaka cover)	Ringo Sheena	Ringo Sheena	Yes	
"Juwaki no Naka" (受話器の中, "In the Receiver")	Ringo Sheena	Ringo Sheena	Yes	
"Kanashimi no Hate" (悲しみの果て, "The End of Sadness") (Elephant Kashimashi cover)	Shū Koyama x Ringo Sheena x Jōsei	Hiroji Miyamoto	No	
"Kenka Jōtō" (喧嘩上等, "Superior Fighting") (Tokyo Jihen cover)	Ringo Sheena	Ringo Sheena	Yes	
"Kimochi" ("Feeling") (Zazen Boys cover)	Zazen Boys x Ringo Sheena x Tabu Zombie	Shutoku Mukai	Yes	
"Kinjirareta Asobi" (禁じられた遊び, "Forbidden Games") (Tokyo Jihen cover)	Ringo Sheena	Ringo Sheena, Ichiyo Izawa	Yes	
"Kon'ya wa Karasawagi" (今夜はから騒ぎ, "Tonight Is Much Ado About Nothing") (Tokyo Jihen cover)	Ringo Sheena	Ringo Sheena	Yes	
"Kudamono no Heya" (果物の部屋, "Room of Fruit")	Ringo Sheena	Ringo Sheena	Yes	
"Misty" (Erroll Garner cover)	Neko Saito Strings Quartet featuring Ringo Sheena	Erroll Garner, Johnny Burke	No	
"Nyūtō Destroyer" (乳頭デストロイヤー, Nyūtō Desutoroiyā, "Nipple Destroyer")	Ringo Sheena	Ringo Sheena	Yes	
"Orgel" (オルゴール, Orugōru)	Ringo Sheena	Ringo Sheena	Yes	
"Sha La La" (シャ・ラ・ラ) (Southern All Stars cover)	Ken Hirai featuring Ringo Sheena	Keisuke Kuwata	Yes	
"Sōnan" (遭難, "Disaster") (Tokyo Jihen cover)	Ringo Sheena	Ringo Sheena	Yes	
"Tamatebako" (玉手箱, "Casket")	Ringo Sheena	Ringo Sheena	Yes	
"Tengoku e Yōkoso" (Tokyo Jihen cover)	Ringo Sheena	Ringo Sheena	Yes	
"Traveling" (Hikaru Utada cover)	Ringo Sheena	Hikaru Utada	Yes	
"UFO" (Pink Lady cover)	Ringo Sheena	Shunichi Tokura, Yū Aku	Yes	
