= List of bands associated with Ringo Sheena =

Japanese singer Ringo Sheena has been a member of many bands in the course of her career. Most of those listed were during the 1990s and early 2000s and have two-word names, the first being in kanji and the second in katakana. This naming convention is also present in her studio albums Muzai Moratorium (1999), Shōso Strip (2000) and later in 2009, Sanmon Gossip, as well as the songs "Rinne Highlight" (輪廻ハイライト) (1999), "Marunouchi Sadistic" (丸の内サディスティック) (1999), her unpublished song "Nyūtō Destroyer" (乳頭デストロイヤー) (1999), "Benkai Debussy" (弁解ドビュッシー) (2000) and "Byōshō Public" (病床パブリック) (2000).

== 37564 ==
37564 (Mi Na Go Ro Shi, "Massacre") was a session band formed to perform the song "Nippon" (2014). In its initial line-up, it featured three guitarists: Sheena, session musician Yukio Nagoshi and Shinichi Ubukata of the bands Ellegarden and Nothing's Carved in Stone. In addition, the band featured Noriyasu "Kāsuke" Kawamura on drums, Hiroshi Watanabe on bass and Nobuhiko Nakayama programming the track. 37564 was reformed to record Hi Izuru Tokoro (2014), with Nagoshi, as well as two members of the band 100s, Hiroo Yamaguchi and Tom Tamada.

== 893 ==
893 (Hachi Kyū San, "Yakuza") is a band Sheena formed to perform her Chotto Shita Reco Hatsu mini-tour in 2014, and also to record the song "Sakasa ni Kazoete" from her "Nippon" (2014) single. It featured Midorin from Soil & "Pimp" Sessions on drums, Keisuke Torigoe on contrabass, Yoshiaki Sato on accordion, Masaki Hayashi on piano and Ringo Sheena on vocals and guitars. All of the members had performed at Sheena's Tōtaikai: Heisei Nijūgo-nendo Kamiyama-chō Taikai concert in 2013. Sato also arranged the song "Saisakizaka" for Sheena's album Gyakuyunyū: Kōwankyoku, released at the time of the concerts.

== Ano Yo no Orchestra ==
Ano Yo no Orchestra (アノヨノオーケストラ, Ano Yo no Ōkesutora, "The Other World Orchestra") was a collaboration between Ringo Sheena and Neko Saito for her soundtrack album Heisei Fūzoku (2007), which performed the song "Sakuran (Terra Ver.)."

== Bakeneko Killer ==
Bakeneko Killer (化猫キラー, Bakeneko Kirā, "Goblin Cat Killer") was a name Sheena gave to the production duo consisting of herself and Uni Inoue (井上雨迩). The pair worked together on the album Kalk Samen Kuri no Hana (2003). Bakeneko Killer was reunited in 2009 to work on Sheena's studio album Sanmon Gossip.

== Bōtoku Vitamin ==
Bōtoku Vitamin (冒涜ヴァイタミン, Bōtoku Vaitamin, "Blasphemy Vitamin") was a session band formed to perform the Mori Pact disc of Utaite Myōri: Sono Ichi (2002). It was led by Toshiyuki Mori (森俊之), who sequenced and arranged songs, played keyboard, the electric guitar and the bass synthesizer. Other members included Hitoshi Watanabe (渡辺等) (wood bass, electric bass), Takashi Numazawa (沼澤尚) (drums, tambourine) and occasionally support from Uni Inoue.

== Gyakutai Glykogen ==
Gyakutai Glykogen (虐待グリコゲン, Gyakutai Gurikogen, "Abuse Glycogen") was a band formed to perform Sheena's Gekokujyo Xstasy tour that was performed from April to June in 2000. The band featured Ringo Sheena on vocals and electric bass, Seiji Kameda on electric bass, Junji Yayoshi (弥吉淳二) on electric guitar, Makoto Minagawa (皆川真人) on synthesizer and keyboard and Masayuki Muraishi (村石雅行) on drums.

The band's recordings have been released several times in Sheena's discography. They were the first band on Sheena's 3-CD box set Ze-Chyou Syuu, released in September 2000, which featured the band performing the songs "Yattsuke Shigoto," "Gamble" and "Onaji Yoru." Footage of the Gekokujyo Xstasy tour was later released on DVD and VHS on December 7, 2000. The band were the session musicians for the Kame Pact disc of Utaite Myōri: Sono Ichi (2002). The band also performed the Zazen Extasy live concert, which was recorded in 2000 but released in 2008.

In November 2000, Sheena married Gyakutai Glykogen guitarist Junji Yayoshi, and gave birth to a son in July 2001. The pair then later divorced in January 2002.

== Hachiōji Gulliver ==
Hachiōji Gulliver (八王子ガリバー, Hachiōji Garibā) was a band Sheena performed with before her major debut in 1998 at live houses in Fukuoka. It featured Junko Murata (村田純子) on bass, Marvelous Marble member Rino Tokitsu (時津梨乃) on drums and Ryō Asagami (淺上了) on sound equipment.

The band sung a mixture of Sheena's solo songs and covers of Western musicians, such as T. Rex, The Cranberries, France Gall and Björk.

== Hatsuiku Status ==
Hatsuiku Status (発育ステータス, Hatsuiku Stētasu, "Growth Status") was an all-female band with three bassists formed by Sheena to perform on the Gokiritsu Japon tour in June and July 2000. The tour was a series of secret lives, with Sheena not being billed as a performing artist. The band consisted of Ringo Sheena (vocals, electric bass), Metalchicks and former DMBQ drummer Yuka Yoshimura (吉村由加), Number Girl and Bloodthirsty Butchers guitarist Hisako Tabuchi (田渕ひさ子), electric bassist Yasunobu Torii (鳥井泰伸) and Junko Murata from Sheena's previous band Hachiōji Gulliver.

The band's setlist was composed entirely of new compositions by Sheena and other band members, often with a theme of growth. The band's recordings have been released twice in Sheena's discography. They were the third band on Sheena's 3-CD box set Ze-Chyou Syuu, released in September 2000, which featured the band performing the songs "Fukurande Kichatta," "Haihai" and "Kōgōsei." Footage of their Hatsuiku Status: Gokiritsu Japon tour was later released on DVD and VHS on December 7, 2000. The songs "Fukurande Kichatta" and "Haihai" do not appear on the DVD.

Bassist Yasunobu Torii appeared in the music video for "Honnō," and guitarist Hisako Tabuchi later featured in the recording of "Sigma."

== Himitsu Butai ==
Himitsu Butai (秘密部隊, "Secret Corps") was a session band created to record the songs "Meisai" and "Ishiki" for the "Stem" single and Sheena's third studio album Kalk Samen Kuri no Hana (2003). It featured electric guitar by Ukigumo (then Ryosuke Nagaoka), drums by Ahito Inazawa (アヒト・イナザワ) (Vola and the Oriental Machine, formerly Number Girl), bass and contrabass by Hitoshi Watanabe, shinobue by Hideyo Takakuwa (高桑英世), violin by Neko Saito and didgeridoo by Tab Zombie from Soil & "Pimp" Sessions.

== Ikenai Kotachi ==
Ikenai Kotachi (いけない子達, "The Bad Kids") were a five-member session band created to record songs for Rie Tomosaka's "Shōjo Robot" in 2000. It featured Rie Tomosaka on vocals, Ringo Sheena on piano and chorus, Hisako Tabuchi of Number Girl/Bloodthirsty Butchers as the band's guitarist, Eikichi Iwai (岩井英吉) as a bassist (who later performed with Chirinuruwowaka) and drummer Rino Tokitsu of Roletta Secohan and Sheena's high school band Marvelous Marble.

The band performed three songs for the single, "Shōjo Robot," "Ikenai Ko" and "Nippon ni Umarete." "Shōjo Robot" and "Ikenai Ko" were written with Tomosaka's image in mind, while "Nippon ni Umarete" was an unused demo from the Shōso Strip sessions.

== Josei Jōi Kinen Orchestra ==
Josei Jōi Kinen Orchestra (女性上位記念オーケストラ, Josei Jōi Kinen Ōkesutora, "Women First Memorial Orchestra") was an orchestra created to record "Kuki," the Japanese-language version of "Stem" featured on the album Kalk Samen Kuri no Hana (2003).

== Karisome Orchestra ==
Karisome Orchestra (カリソメオーケストラ, Karisome Ōkesutora, "The Temporary Orchestra") was a collaboration between Ringo Sheena and Neko Saito for her soundtrack album Heisei Fūzoku (2007), to record the song "Karisome Otome" in September, 2006. The orchestra recorded two versions, the Hitokuchizaka version found on the "Kono Yo no Kagiri" single as a B-side which was recorded at Hitokuchizaka Studio in Kudankita, Chiyoda, Tokyo, as well as the Tameikesannoh version, recorded near to the Tameike-Sannō Station in Nagatachō, Chiyoda.

== Kōcha Kinoko ==
Kōcha Kinoko (紅茶キノコ, "Tea Mushroom") was one of the bands thanked in the booklet of Muzai Moratorium (1999), which lists the members' nicknames as Shige, Shin-chan, Shira-chan and Rino.

== Komae no Orchestra ==
Komae no Orchestra (コマエノオーケストラ, Komae no Ōkesutora) was a collaboration between Ringo Sheena and Neko Saito for her soundtrack album Heisei Fūzoku (2007), to re-record the song "Gamble," a song originally from Ze-Chyou Syuu (2000). The orchestra recorded the song at a studio in Komae, Tokyo.

== Kono Yo no Orchestra ==
Kono Yo no Orchestra (コノヨノオーケストラ, Kono Yo no Ōkesutora, "The Orchestra of This World") was a collaboration between Ringo Sheena and Neko Saito for her soundtrack album Heisei Fūzoku (2007), to record the leading single "Kono Yo no Kagiri."

== Kuri no Hana Kaoru Orchestra ==
Kuri no Hana Kaoru Orchestra (栗ノ花薫オーケストラ, Kuri no Hana Kaoru Ōkesutora, "Chestnut Flower Scented Orchestra") was an orchestra conducted by Yuichiro Goto to record songs for the album Kalk Samen Kuri no Hana (2003). The orchestra recorded the songs "Shūkyō," "Doppelganger," "Poltergeist" and "Sōretsu."

== Kurubushi Hysteric ==
Kurubushi Hysteric (踝ヒステリック, "Ankle Hysteric") was one of the bands thanked in the booklet of Muzai Moratorium (1999), which lists the members' nicknames as Macha, Kuma and Rino.

== Mangarama ==
Mangarama were a special band created for Ringo Sheena's concert at the Taipei World Trade Center Nangang Exhibition Hall on August 16, 2015. In addition to Sheena, the band featured former Tokyo Jihen members Ukigumo on guitar and Masayuki Hiizumi on piano, Yukio Nagoshi on guitar, Keisuke Torigoe on bass guitar, Tom Tamada on drums and Yoshiaki Sato on accordion. In addition to the rock band ensemble, the band featured brass instruments: Koji Nishimura on the trumpet, Osamu Koike on both the saxophone and the flute, and Yoichi Murata on trombone. Saya and Yuka, two dancers from Elevenplay were also billed as being a part of Mangarama.

== Marvelous Marble ==
Marvelous Marble (マーベラス・マーブル, Māberasu Māburu) was a high school all-female band from Fukuoka who performed at the 9th Teens' Music Festival in 1995, singing a cover of Danielle Brisebois song "Just Missed the Train." It featured Yukiko Tsuda (津田由貴子) on guitar, Ai Nakagawa (中川愛) on bass, Izumi Suenaga (末永いずみ) on keyboard, Rino Tokitsu (時津梨乃) on drums and Sheena on vocals (then known as Yumiko Shiina). The group also performed at the Nagasaki Kayōsai, reaching the finals. The group disbanded when Sheena left high school in her second year.

Drummer Rino Tokitsu later went on to perform with the band Roletta Secohan.

== Matatabi Orchestra ==
Matatabi Orchestra (マタタビオーケストラ, Matatabi Ōkesutora, "The Catnip Orchestra") was a collaboration between Ringo Sheena and Neko Saito for Dai Ikkai Ringo-han Taikai: Adults Only (第1回林檎班大会 アダルト・オンリー, "Adults Only: The First Members-Only Extravaganza for the Ringo Squad Fan Club"), a series of concerts held in December 2005. The orchestra was used again for her soundtrack album Heisei Fūzoku (2007), performing the songs "Papaya Mango," "Yokushitsu," "Meisai" and "Yume no Ato."

== Mizuage Orchestra ==
Mizuage Orchestra (ミズアゲオーケストラ, Mizuage Ōkesutora) was a collaboration between Ringo Sheena and Neko Saito for her soundtrack album Heisei Fūzoku (2007), to record the song "Sakuran (Onkio Version)," a B-side of the "Kono Yo no Kagiri" single. It was recorded at Onkio Haus in Ginza, Chūō, Tokyo. Mizuage is a term for an oiran's coming-of-age ceremony.

== Momoiro Spanner ==
Momoiro Spanner (桃色スパナ, "Pink Spanner") was one of three session bands formed to record for Sheena's debut album, Muzai Moratorium (1999). The band featured Sheena on vocals, piano, fake koto (Synthesizer) and whistle, Seiji Kameda on bass guitar,Akihito Suzuki (鈴木玲史) on electric guitar, acoustic guitar and backing vocal guidance, and Noriyasu Kawamura on drums and conga.

The band performed the songs "Akane Sasu, Kiro Terasaredo...," "Tsumiki Asobi," "Onaji Yoru" and "Morphine."

== Nadataru Orchestra ==
Nadataru Orchestra (ナダタルオーケストラ, Nadataru Ōkesutora, "The Famous Orchestra"") was a collaboration between Ringo Sheena and Neko Saito for her soundtrack album Heisei Fūzoku (2007). The orchestra recorded two new songs, "Hatsukoi Shōjo" and "Oiran," which both featured electronic arrangements.

== Noraneko Orchestra ==
Noraneko Orchestra (ノラネコオーケストラ, Noraneko Ōkesutora, "The Alley Cat Orchestra") was an orchestra used for her Baishō Ecstasy concert, held on May 27, 2003, that was conducted by Neko Saito. The orchestra was later utilised on her soundtrack album Heisei Fūzoku (2007), recording the songs "Stem," "Ishiki" and "Poltergeist," where were all originally songs from her album Kalk Samen Kuri no Hana (2003).

== Ōoku Kinen Orchestra ==
Ōoku Kinen Orchestra (大奥記念オーケストラ, Ōoku Kinen Ōkesutora, "Ōoku Memorial Orchestra") was an orchestra conducted by Yuichiro Goto especially for the recording sessions of "Stem" and Kalk Samen Kuri no Hana (2003). The orchestra recorded the songs "Stem (Daimyō Asobi-hen)" and the studio version of "Yattsuke Shigoto."

== Ringo-haku Kinen Buyō-dan ==
Ringo-haku Kinen Buyō-dan (林檎博記念舞踊団, Ringo Expo Memorial Dance Troupe) was a troupe of dancers used for Ringo Sheena's three 10th anniversary concerts at Saitama Super Arena in 2008, (Nama) Ringo-haku '08: Jūshūnen Kinen-sai ((生)林檎博'08 ～10周年記念祭～). It featured choreographer Shigetaro Ide (井手茂太) and dancers Mineko Saitō (斉藤美音子), Nagisa Sugao (菅尾なぎさ), Tomoko Yoda (依田朋子) and Ai Kaneko (金子あい). Also featured were the Koenji Awa Odori Shinkō Kyōkai (高円寺阿波おどり振興協会, "Koenji Awa Dance Promotion Association"), who performed the Awa Dance, a famous dance from Tokushima Prefecture.

== Ringo-haku Kinen Kangen Gakudan ==
Ringo-haku Kinen Kangen Gakudan (林檎博記念管弦楽団, "Ringo Expo Memorial Orchestra") was a backing band used for Ringo Sheena's three 10th anniversary concerts at Saitama Super Arena in 2008, (Nama) Ringo-haku '08: Jūshūnen Kinen-sai. It featured vocals, electric guitar, electronic keyboard by Ringo Sheena, arrangement by Neko Saito, electric guitar by Yukio Nagoshi, electric bass by Seiji Kameda, drums by Noriyasu Kawamura, piano by Elton Nagata (エルトン永田), electric and acoustic guitar by Fumio Yanagisawa (柳沢二三男), percussion by Mataro Misawa (三沢またろう) and sequencer by Nobuhiko Nakayama (中山信彦).

As well as the band musicians, a 60-member orchestra was featured, which was conducted by Neko Saito and led by concert master Great Eida. The orchestra featured more than 16 instruments, including flutes, an oboe, a clarinet, a bassoon, French horns, alto, tenor and baritone saxophones, trumpets, trombones, percussion instruments, a harp, vilions, violas, cellos and double basses.

== Saimin Electric Guitar ==
Saimin Electric Guitar (催眠エレキギター, "Hypnotic Electric Guitar") was one of the bands thanked in the booklet of Muzai Moratorium (1999), which lists the members' nicknames as Ryota, Kore and Sada.

== Seirei Catharsis ==
Seirei Catharsis (政令カタルシス, "Ordinance Catharsis") was a non-musical collaborative unit between Sheena and illustrator Mitsuru Nakamura. It was featured in Nakamura's 1999 illustration book, Watashi no E ja Dame da ne (君の絵じゃダメだね, "My Drawings Aren't Good Enough")

== Shūdan Jiketsu ==
Shūdan Jiketsu (集団自決, "Group Suicide") was a band formed in 1999 featuring Ringo Sheena (vocals), Susumu Nishikawa (guitar) and Seiji Kameda (bass). The band was used for miscellaneous live events in 1999, as well as studio recordings.

== Tensai Präparat ==
Tensai Präparat (天才プレパラート, Tensai Pureparāto, "Genius Prepared Specimen") was a band formed to perform at Sheena's Manabiya Ecstasy (学舎エクスタシー, "School Ecstasy") tour of university campuses in November 1999. Audio from these tours was recorded for Ze-Chyou Syuu (2000), however Sheena was not satisfied with the results, and re-recorded three songs in studio instead for the collection. The band consisted of Ringo Sheena on vocals and electric guitar, Makoto Tani (戸谷誠) on electric guitar, Eikichi Iwai on electric bass and theremin and Hisashi Nishikawa (西川央) on drums.

Tensai Präparat recorded the songs "Mellow," "Fukō Jiman" and "So Cold" for Ze-Chyou Syuu.

== Tokyo Jihen ==
Tokyo Jihen (東京事変, "Tokyo Incidents") is a band formed in 2004, which became Ringo Sheena's main musical project from 2004 to 2012. The initial line-up of the band was composed of Ringo Sheena as the band's vocalist, main songwriter and guitarist, long-time producer of Sheena's solo works Seiji Kameda as a bassist, session drummer Toshiki Hata (刄田綴色), pianist for the jazz ensemble band PE'Z, Masayuki Hiizumi, and guitarist Mikio Hirama (平間幹央). The group initially were the concert musicians who played for Sheena's Electric Mole tour in 2003. After the band's debut album Kyōiku (2004) and first live tour Dynamite!, Hiizumi and Hirama left the band. They were replaced by guitarist Ukigumo of the band Petrolz, and pianist Ichiyō Izawa of the band Appa.

== Tokyo Magical Big Band ==
Tokyo Magical Big Band (東京マジカルビッグバンド, Tōkyō Majikaru Biggu Bando) was a special unit of Tokyo Jihen, to perform the song "Onna no Ko wa Dare Demo". The project was led by conductor Takayuki Hattori, and featured all of the members of Tokyo Jihen, as well as 13 additional musicians to perform the swing jazz song.

== Tokyo Samba Paradise Band ==
Tokyo Samba Paradise Band (東京サンバパラダイスバンド, Tōkyō Sanba Paradaisu Bando) was a special unit of Tokyo Jihen, to perform the song "Tengoku e Yōkoso (Tokyo Bay Ver.)", a samba instrumental version of the song. Tokyo Jihen members performed their regular instruments, except for Hata, who performed on the agogô, tamborim, shaker, timbales and surdo. There were two additional members in the project, flautist Hideyo Takakuwa and vibraphone performer Midori Takada.

== Uchū Antenna ==
Uchū Antenna (宇宙アンテナ, "Space Antenna") was a group that formed in Fukuoka in August 1996 after Sheena left high school. It featured Takashi Taniguchi (谷口崇), who later had a solo career, and Hidekazu Kuchira (久知良秀和).

Sheena later performed chorus work on Takashi Taniguchi's 1998 album Becoming.

== Yokoshima ==
Yokoshima (邪, "Wicked") is a band formed by Ringo Sheena in 2002, featuring Jumpei Shiina (keyboard), Ringo Sheena (chorus), Takashi Numazawa (drums), Toshiyuki Mori (森俊之) on piano and Ryosuke Nagaoka (vocals, guitar). Nagaoka was later known as Tokyo Jihen guitarist Ukigumo.

The group released a cover of the Toto song "Georgy Porgy" as a limited download between April 10 to April 17, 2002, and later May 1 to May 9, 2002.

Takashi Numazawa, who was the session drummer of Sheena's album Utaite Myōri: Sono Ichi (2002), was acquainted with the drummer of Toto, Jeff Porcaro. Numazawa learned how to drum from Jeff's father Joe Porcaro, and he worked in his drum school as an instructor after graduation. This gave Sheena the idea for the project.

Though Ringo Sheena was going to sing all the parts of this song at first, she was dissatisfied at how her voice could not mimic Steve Lukather's voice. After hearing Nagaoka, who was a member of Junpei Shiina's band, sing to the song in her car, she felt his voice was much more suited to the song, and made him the main vocalist.

Sheena considers the performance just a "copy" of the song and not a cover with any extra input, and felt it was not something suitable to put on an album.

== Zekkyō Solfeggio ==
Zekkyō Solfeggio (絶叫ソルフェージュ, Zekkyō Sorufēju, "Scream Solfeggio") was one of three session bands formed to record for Sheena's debut album, Muzai Moratorium (1999), however they performed only a single song, "Marunouchi Sadistic." The band featured Sheena on vocals, piano, melodica, handclap and footsteps, Seiji Kameda on bass guitar and backing vocals, and Noriyasu Kawamura on drums, backing vocals, handclaps and footsteps.

== Zetsurin Hectopascal ==
Zetsurin Hectopascal (絶倫ヘクトパスカル, Zetsurin Hekutopasukaru, "Matchless Hectopascal") was one of three session bands formed to record the bulk of Sheena's debut album, Muzai Moratorium (1999). It featured Sheena on vocals, and drums for "Kabukichō no Joō." Other members included Susumu Nishikawa (西川進) of Diamond Head playing acoustic and electric guitar, Seiji Kameda playing bass and Noriyasu Kawamura playing drums and singing backing vocals.

The band recorded the songs "Tadashii Machi," "Kabukichō no Joō," "Kōfukuron (Etsuraku-hen)," "Sid to Hakuchūmu," "Koko de Kiss Shite." and "Keikoku."

== See also ==
- Ringo Sheena production discography
- Ringo Sheena discography
- Ringo Sheena videography
- Tokyo Jihen discography
