= Ze-Chyou Syuu =

Ze-Chyou Syuu 絶頂集

EP by Ringo Sheena
- Released: September 13, 2000
- Recorded: Shibuya Public Hall (Disc1); NHK Hall (Disc1); Studio Terra (Disc2); Shinjuku Liquidroom (Disc3)
- Genres: J-pop, pop, rock and roll, hard rock, grunge, punk rock, pop rock, jazz, kayōkyoku
- Length: 14:34 (Disc 1); 11:25 (Disc 2); 8:22 (Disc 3)
- Language: Japanese
- Label: Toshiba EMI / Virgin Music
- Producer: Uni Inoue

Ringo Sheena chronology
Shōso Strip (2000)	Ze-Chyou Syuu 絶頂集 (2000)	Utaite Myōri: Sono Ichi (2002)

Ze-Chyou Syuu (絶頂集, Zetchōshū), also known as The Acme Collection, is an EP by Japanese singer and songwriter Ringo Sheena. Composed of both live and studio recordings, it was released on September 13, 2000 by Toshiba EMI / Virgin Music. The RIAJ certified Ze-Chyou Syuu as a gold certified album for 200,000 copies shipped.

== Background ==
After releasing her debut album Muzai Moratorium in February 1999, she toured the album on her six-date Senkō Ecstasy tour in April 1999, with her band Gyakutai Glykogen. After finishing the tour, Sheena recorded her second album Shōso Strip. After the recording sessions were finished, Sheena embarked on the four date Manabiya Ecstasy tour performed with Tensai Präparat in November, in which Sheena toured university campuses: Tokai University's Shonan Capus in Hiratsuka, Kanagawa, Showa Women's University in Tokyo, Seinan Gakuin University in Fukuoka and Ritsumeikan University in Kyoto.

After the singles "Honnō" (1999), "Gips" (2000) and "Tsumi to Batsu" (2000), Sheena released Shōso Strip on March 31, 2000. It was a great success, being certified for two million copies shipped to stores by the RIAJ. From April to June, Sheena embarked on her 16 date third national tour, Gekokujō Xstasy, starting in Utsunomiya, Tochigi and finishing in Morioka, Iwate. In June and July, Sheena quickly toured again, with a band called Hatsuiku Status. The band performed secret lives and they were not widely publicised.

"So Cold", "Mellow" and "Fukō Jiman" were first performed at November 2, 1999 at Tokai University's Shonan Campus. "Yattsuke Shigoto" and "Gamble" were first performed on April 17, 2000 on the first date of the Gekokujō Xstasy tour. "Onaji Yoru", a song originally appearing on Muzai Moratorium (1999), was first performed on April 1, 1999, on the first date of her Senkō Ecstasy tour in Fukuoka. The Hatsuiku Status songs were all brand new, and had not been performed before their June and July 2000 tour.

== Concept ==
A promotional poster for Ze-Chyou Syuu, showing Sheena with a headache and the medicine concept.

The box set was created to look like a medicine case. As the set was composed of 8 cm singles, Sheena thought back to the 1980s, the era of 8 cm singles and thought of idol Hiroko Mita, who had appeared on many posters for medical products, acting as if her stomach or head hurt. So for the promotional posters, Sheena stood with her head or stomach in pain, with the Ze-Chyou Syuu case advertised on top, as if it were medicine.

The set is composed of three 8 cm CDs, each featuring a performance from a different band. Disc 1 features performances by Gyakutai Glykogen from Gekokujō Xstasy. Disc 2 is a collection of studio recordings with Tensai Präparat. Sheena intended for these to be live recordings from their Manabiya Tour, but as the sound quality was not what she wanted, she decided to re-record them. Disc 3 contains three songs from the Hatsuiku Status: Gokiritsu Japon tour.

Two of the songs were given mojibake titles in the Ze-Chyou Syuu booklet: "Onaji Yoru" was written as Jｪﾁ~ｯじo？ｳ,, and "So Cold" as 喪@CINコ瑠ヲュWァ,.

== Promotion ==
"Yattsuke Shigoto" was given a music video to promote the release. It was shot on the day of the dress rehearsal of the one-night stand live Zazen Ecstasy performed at Kaho Theater in Iizuka-shi, Fukuoka in 2000. All extras playing spectators in the theater were her fans, and they were chosen from her fans who drew a blank in the lottery of the live ticket. The parody of the news report of the various countries in the world at the beginning is used as the introduction part of the music of different arrangement recorded in her third album Kalk Samen Kuri no Hana (2003). In 2006, "Yattsuke Shigoto" was covered by Kera and the Synthesizers on their third album Tonari no Onna.

== Track listing ==
All lyrics are written by Ringo Sheena; all music is composed by Ringo Sheena unless otherwise noted. All songs arranged and played by each band.

Disc 1: Abuse Glycogen (虐待グリコゲン Gyakutai Gurikogen)
No.	Title	Length
1.	"Rush Job" (やっつけ仕事 Yattsuke Shigoto)	3:29
2.	"Gamble" (ギャンブル Gyanburu)	5:31
3.	"Ordinary Night" (Jｪﾁ~ｯじo？ｳ Onaji Yoru)	5:30
Total length:		14:34

Disc 2: Genius Präparat (天才プレパラート Tensai Pureparaato)
No.	Title	Music	Length
1.	"Mellow" (メロウ Merō)	Makoto Totani; Sheena	5:54
2.	"Unhappy Pride" (不幸自慢 Fukō Jiman)		2:25
3.	"So Cold" (喪@CINコ瑠ヲュWァ)		3:05
Total length:			11:25

Disc 3: Growth Status (発育ステータス Hatsuiku Suteetasu)
No.	Title	Music	Length
1.	"It Expanded" (膨らんできちゃった Fukurande kichatta)		2:06
2.	"Crawling" (はいはい Hai Hai)	Sheena; Hisako Tabuchi	2:34
3.	"Photosynthesis" (光合成 Kougousei)		3:41
Total length:			8:22

== Credits and personnel ==
Disc 1: Gyakutai Glycogen (虐待グリコゲン, Abuse Glycogen)

- Ringo Sheena - vocals, electric guitar:
- Junji Yayoshi (Sheena’s ex-husband) - electric guitar
- Seiji Kameda - electric bass guitar
- Makoto Minagawa (from Thinners, Sparky) - synthesizer, keyboard instrument
- Masayuki Muraishi - drums

Disc 2: Tensai Praeparat (天才プレパラート, Genius Praeparat)

- Ringo Sheena - vocals, electric guitar
- Makoto Totani (from Milk Crown, Thinners) - electric guitar
- Eikichi Iwai - electric bass guitar, theremin
- Hisashi Nishikawa (he is Sheena’s friend and an amateur) - Drums

Disc 3: Hatsuiku Status (発育ステータス, Growth Status)

- Ringo Sheena - vocals, electric bass guitar
- Junko Murata (from Hachioji Gulliver) - electric bass guitar
- Hisako Tabuchi (from Number Girl, toddle, Bloodthirsty Butchers)- electric guitar
- Yasunobu Torii (from Panicsmile, Gaji) - electric bass guitar
- Yuka Yoshimura (of Catsuomaticdeath, Metalchicks, ex-DMBQ, ex-Hydro-Guru, ex-OOIOO, ex-Mensu) - Drums
