= Mayonaka wa Junketsu =

Single by Ringo Sheena
- Released: March 27, 2001
- Length: 11:55
- Label: Toshiba EMI / Virgin Music
- Songwriter(s): Ringo Sheena
- Producer(s): Uni Inoue

Ringo Sheena singles chronology
"Gips" (2000)	"Mayonaka wa Junketsu" (2001)	"Stem (Daimyō Asobihen)" (2003)

"Mayonaka wa Junketsu" (真夜中は純潔, Chastity at Midnight) is Japanese singer Ringo Sheena's 6th single and it was released on March 27, 2001 by Toshiba EMI / Virgin Music.

== Background ==
In this single, Sheena canceled her partnership with Seiji Kameda, with whom she had arranged her songs up to that point, and asked musicians of various genres to arrange her songs. She arranged three songs in a "night, daytime, and a morning" order, according to the title, and she showed the reading of these song titles by writing katakana.

All players of each song were named "- Paradise Orchestra" on "Mayonaka wa Junketsu" which is the title tune of this single. Shin Tokyo Ska Paradise Orchestra (新東京スカパラダイスオーケストラ, New Tokyo Ska Paradise Orchestra) is a Ska band, and Higashi-Nihon Swing Paradise Orchestra (東日本スウィングパラダイスオーケストラ, East-Japan Swing Paradise Orchestra) is a big band, and Zen-Nihon Scherzo Paradise Orchestra (全日本スケルツォパラダイスオーケストラ, All-Japan Scherzo Paradise Orchestra) is the trio of a pianist, a bassist, a drummer, with accordionist coba.

Sheena intended to record "Mayonaka wa Junketsu" and "Aisaika no Chōshoku" on the third album Kalk Samen Kuri no Hana. However, she judged that they weren’t suitable for the view of the world of the album while she was producing that, and she shelved the adoption of the two songs for the album.

The literal translation of song titles is slightly different from the official English title.

The song was covered by Mino Kabasawa on her piano cover album Piano Pure: Memory of 2001, by Rieko Miura, Atsuko Kurusu and Saki Kamiryo on the NTV variety show The Yoru mo Hippare: Aki no Special on September 22, 2001 and by Max on the NTV variety show The Seiya mo Hippare: 2001 Christmas Special on December 15, 2001.

== Music video ==
"Mayonaka wa Junketsu" was accompanied by an animated music video. Originally, the music video was filmed by live action. The story was that a mysterious woman fights with a baldheaded leader of an evil secret society. Sheena played the woman and Masato Minagawa, a keyboard player of her band, played the enemy's leader.

However, Sheena's pregnancy came to light while filming, so the video was hurriedly changed into animation. The story remained as it was and the character design was also modeled on Sheena and Minagawa. Her pet cat "Goethe" also appears in the music video as a cyborg cat. The heroine was named "Mayo Kiyozumi" (潔純真夜, Kiyozumi Mayo) according to the anagram of the song title.

== Track listing ==
All tracks are written by Ringo Sheena

CD
No.	Title	Arranger(s)	Length
1.	"Mayonaka wa Junketsu (真夜中は純潔, Chastity at Midnight)"	Shin Tokyo Ska Paradise Orchestra	4:19
2.	"Sido to Hakuchūmu (シドと白昼夢, Sid & Daydreams)" (from Muzai Moratorium)	orchestrated by Takayuki Hattori	3:36
3.	"Aisaika no Chōshoku (愛妻家の朝食, Your Breakfast)"	Toshiyuki Mori	3:58
Total length:			11:55

== Credits and personnel ==
1. Mayonaka wa Junketsu
  with Shin Tokyo Ska Paradise Orchestra (新東京スカパラダイスオーケストラ, New Tokyo Ska Paradise Orchestra)
  - Trumpet: Nargo (Kimiyoshi Nagoya)
  - Trombone: Masahiko Kitahara
  - Alto Saxophone & Agitator: Tatsuyuki Hiyamuta
  - Tenor Saxophone: Gamou
  - Baritone Saxophone: Atsushi Yanaka
  - Piano: Yuichi Oki
  - Electric Bass: Tsuyoshi Kawakami
  - Electric guitar: Takashi Kato
  - Percussions: Hajime Ohmori
  - Drums: Kin-ichi Motegi (from Fishmans, support member)
2. Sido to Hakuchūmu
  with Higashi-Nihon Swing Paradise Orchestra (東日本スウィングパラダイスオーケストラ, East-Japan Swing Paradise Orchestra)
  - Electric guitar: Jun Sumida
  - Double bass: Benisuke Sakai
  - Drums: Shuichi "Ponta" Murakami
  - Electronic organ: Nobuo Kurata
  - Trumpet: Eric Miyashiro, Shiro Sasaki, Yusuke Hayashi, Isao Sakuma
  - Trombone: Eijoro Nakagawa, Osamu Matsumoto, Satoshi Sano
  - Bass Trombone: Junko Yamashiro
  - Alto Saxophone & flute: Bob Zung, Kazuhiko Kondo
  - Tenor Saxophone: Osamu Koike, Osamu Yoshida
  - Baritone Saxophone: Masakuni Takeno
  - Harp: Yuko Taguchi
  - Vibraphone & Glockenspiel: Hitoshi Hamada
3. Aisaika no Chōshoku
  with Zen-Nihon Scherzo Paradise Orchestra (全日本スケルツォパラダイスオーケストラ, All-Japan Scherzo Paradise Orchestra)
  - Piano & Programming: Toshiyuki Mori
  - Contrabass: Hitoshi Watanabe
  - Drums: Takashi Numazawa
  - Accordion: coba Yasuhiro Kobayashi
