= Kono Yo no Kagiri =

Single by Ringo Sheena, Neko Saito, Junpei Shiina

from the album Heisei Fūzoku
- Released: January 17, 2007
- Length: 10:09 minutes
- Label: Toshiba EMI / Virgin Music
- Songwriters: Ringo Sheena, Neko Saito
- Producer: Inoue Uni

Ringo Sheena, Neko Saito, Junpei Shiina singles chronology
"Karisome Otome" (2006)	"Kono Yo no Kagiri" (2007)	"Ariamaru Tomi" (2009)

"Kono Yo no Kagiri" (この世の限り, Memory) was released by Ringo Sheena, Neko Saito and Junpei Shiina on January 17, 2007 in the name of 椎名林檎×斎藤ネコ＋椎名純平 (Sheena Ringo × Saito Neko + Shiina Junpei). It was certified gold by the RIAJ for 100,000 copies shipped to stores in 2007.

== Background ==
The song was used as theme song for the movie Sakuran, of which Sheena was the music director. The song is a duet with her brother Shiina Junpei, and is shown using the ending of the film. This is the first solo work by Sheena for two months, after the digital single "Karisome Otome (Death Jazz Ver.)" was released, and her first physical single in three years since she released "Ringo no Uta" at the end of 2003. Kiyoshi Hasegawa whom Shiina had respected for a long time played "Sakuran (ONKIO ver.)" on the acoustic guitar.

== Track listing ==
All lyrics are written by Ringo Shiina; all music is composed by Ringo Shiina and orchestrated by Neko Saitō.

No.	Title	Length
1.	"Kono Yo no Kagiri (この世の限り, Memory)"	3:29
2.	"Sakuran (錯乱, Confusion) (ONKYO ver.)"	3:26
3.	"Karisome Otome (カリソメ乙女, Temporary Virgin) (Hitokuchizaka ver.)" (instrumental music)	3:10
Total length:		10:05

== Charts and sales ==
Chart (2007)	Peak position
Japan Oricon weekly singles	8
Japan RIAJ Reco-kyō monthly ringtone chart	49

=== Sales and certifications ===
Chart	Amount
Oricon physical sales	54,000
RIAJ physical certification	Gold (100,000)
