= Karisome Otome =

- Death Jazz Version cover.

Single by Ringo Sheena, Soil & "Pimp" Sessions

from the album Heisei Fūzoku and Sanmon Gossip
- Released: November 11, 2006
- Genre: Jazz
- Length: 2:31
- Label: Toshiba EMI
- Songwriter(s): Ringo Sheena, Soil & "Pimp" Sessions
- Producer(s): Uni Inoue

Ringo Sheena singles chronology
"Ringo no Uta" (2003)	"Karisome Otome" (2006)	"Kono Yo no Kagiri" (2007)

"Karisome Otome" (カリソメ乙女, "Temporary Virgin") is a song written by Japanese singer Ringo Sheena and has several versions.

== Background ==
The song was first released as a digital single on November 11, 2006, "Karisome Otome (DEATH JAZZ ver.)" (カリソメ乙女（DEATH JAZZ ver.）, Temporary Virgin (DEATH JAZZ ver.)), performed by Ringo Sheena and Soil & "Pimp" Sessions and sung in Japanese. This version of the song later showed up on her fourth album. The distributor is Toshiba EMI. This song ascended to the number-one position on iTunes Store in Japan.

The song was performed again on her single "Kono Yo no Kagiri" (2007) as an instrumental tango "Karisome Otome (Hitokuchizaka Ver.)," and "Karisome Otome (Tameikisannoh Ver.)" on the soundtrack album Heisei Fūzoku (2007), performed in English. These two versions were recorded by the Karisome Orchestra, a collaboration with Neko Saito. They were recorded in September 2006.

The single charted at number 67 on the RIAJ's monthly ringtone chart for November 2006.

The song was covered by Maki Nagayama on Asuka Sakai's compilation album Little Love Light: 10 Songs for 10 Stories in 2009.

=== Track listing ===
All lyrics are written by Ringo Shiina; all music is composed by Ringo Shiina, arranged and performed by Soil & "Pimp" Sessions

No.	Title	Length
1.	"Karisome Otome (カリソメ乙女, Temporary Virgin) (DEATH JAZZ ver.)"	2:31

== Personnel ==
Personnel details were sourced from "Kono Yo no Kagiri", Heisei Fūzoku and Sanmon Gossip's liner notes booklet.

Death Jazz version by Soil & "Pimp" Sessions

- Goldman Akita – contrabass
- Jōsei – piano, keyboards
- Midorin – drums
- Motoharu – saxophone
- Shachō – agitator
- Ringo Sheena – vocals, songwriting
- Tabu Zombie – trumpet

Hitokuchizaka and Tameikisannoh versions by the Karisome Orchestra

- Masaki Hayashi – piano
- Natsuki Kido – acoustic guitar, electric guitar
- Keisuke Ohta – viola
- Neko Saito – conductor
- Yoshiaki Sato – accordion
- Ringo Sheena – vocals, songwriting
- Torigoe Yūsuke – bass
- Yūji Yamada – viola
