= Zazen Xstasy =

Zazen Ecstasy DVD
- DVD edition cover.

Video (Live DVD) by Ringo Sheena
- Released: September 17, 2008
- Recorded: July 30, 2000
- Genre: J-pop, Live
- Label: EMI Music Japan

Ringo Sheena chronology
Dai Ikkai Ringohan Taikai no Moyou	Zazen Ecstasy DVD

Zazen Xstasy (座禅エクスタシー, Zazen Ekusutashii; Zen Meditation Ecstasy) was a live show performed by Japanese musician Ringo Sheena at the Kaho Theater (Kaho Gekijou (嘉穂劇場, kaho gekijou) in Iizuka City, Fukuoka. The event took place on July 30, 2000. The event's official name is "Sheena Ringo (rare) Kyushu Performance Zen Meditation Ecstasy (椎名林檎 (稀)実演キューシュー 座禅エクスタシーShiina Ringo Jitsuen Kyūshū Zazen Ekusutashii; Shiina Ringo (mare) Jitsuen Kyūshū Zazen Ekusutashii)".

A video recording of the event was released on DVD by EMI Music Japan on September 17, 2008 as part of the celebration for the 10th anniversary of Ringo Sheena's debut.

== Ticket lottery ==
Due to the high demand for tickets exceeding the capacity of the Kaho Theater (a theater featuring traditional Japanese architecture with a capacity of 1,000 people), tickets for the concert were sold by lottery. The high demand for tickets resulted in many being sold at auction for a higher price. Toshiba EMI broadcast a live-stream of the performance, which was viewed by approximately 17,300 people, a new national record in Japan.

Sheena invited fans who had not managed to get tickets to play extras in the filming of the promotional video for Yattsuke Shigoto on July 28, where band members had a dress rehearsal before the public performance. Inspired by a rock band vocalist who told his fans to "wear black to tomorrow's show" and then did not wear black himself, Sheena asked all the guests to wear red for the day. No music was recorded during filming. The track used in the video was the recording from the performance at Shibuya Public Hall on April 15, 2000 from the "Gekokujou Xstasy" tour. Thus, at the end of the video, the beginning of another song, "Benkai Debussy", can be heard.

== Performance ==
The show was a one-night performance that took place at the Kaho Theater in Iizuka in Fukuoka Prefecture.

The scenic design and stage effects incorporated shōji (the traditional sliding door of translucent paper) and other Japanese-style effects. Sheena and members of the backing band, Gyakutai Glycogen, were all costumed in yukata (traditional cotton kimono). As part of the stage performance, Sheena crucified a mannequin dressed in the image of her bandage-like costume from her previous nationwide tour "Gekokujou Xstasy." She also used similar Japanese themes in her later nationwide tour "Sugoroku Ecstasy" (which was recorded and released on DVD as "Electric Mole"). A photograph of this was posted on the homepage of Kaho Theater.

1. "Tsumiki-asobi (積木遊び, Playing With Blocks)"
2. "Memai (眩暈, Vertigo)"
3. "Shōjo Robot (少女ロボット, Girl Robot)" (Note: She covered the offer song to Rie Tomosaka in person.)
4. "Remote Controller (リモートコントローラー, Remote Control)"
5. "Akane-sasu Kiro Terasaredo... (茜さす 帰路照らされど..., The crimson-gleaming sun still shines on my way back, but...)"
6. "Haikei EMI dono (拝啓EMI殿, Dear Sir EMI)" (Note: She covered Sex Pistols's "E.M.I.", but this song was not recorded on this DVD.)
7. "Identity (アイデンティティ)"
8. "Byōshō Public (病床パブリック, Sickbed Public)"
9. "Unconditional Love" (Cyndi Lauper cover)
10. "Sakana (サカナ, Tidbits)"
11. "Kabuki-chō no Jo-ō (歌舞伎町の女王, Queen of Kabuki-cho)"
12. "Benkai Debussy (弁解ドビュッシー, Excuse Debussy)"
13. "Yokushitsu (浴室, Bathroom)"
14. "My Luxury Night (マイラグジュアリーナイト)" (Note: Originally it was Hatsumi Shibata's song, but she covered the version of Takao Kisugi, the composer.)
15. "Sid to Hakuchumu (シドと白昼夢, Sid & Daydreams)"
16. "Stoicism (ストイシズム)"
17. Encore
18. "Born in Japan (日本に生まれて, Nippon ni Umarete)" (Note: She covered the offer song to Rie Tomosaka in person.)

== Backing band ==
Gyakutai Glycogen (虐待グリコゲン, Abuse Glycogen) (1999–2000)

- Vocals, Electric guitar: Shiina Ringo (椎名林檎)
- Electric guitar: Susumu Nishikawa (西川進) (1999), Junji Yayoshi (弥吉淳二) (2000, Sheena's former husband)
- Electric bass guitar: Seiji Kameda (亀田誠治)
- Synthesizer, Keyboard instrument: Masato Minagawa (皆川真人) (from Thinners, SPARKY)
- Drums: Masayuki Muraishi (村石雅行)
- Music sequencer: Nobuhiko Nakayama (中山信彦)
