= Stem (Ringo Sheena song) =

Single by Ringo Sheena

from the album Kalk Samen Kuri no Hana
- Released: January 22, 2003
- Length: 11:44
- Label: Toshiba EMI / Virgin Music
- Songwriter: Ringo Sheena
- Producer: Uni Inoue

Ringo Sheena singles chronology
"Mayonaka wa Junketsu" (2001)	"Stem" (2003)	"Ringo no Uta" (2003)

"Stem", also known by its Japanese translated title "Kuki" (茎) is a song written by Japanese singer Ringo Sheena and released in several versions.

== Background ==
It was first released as a single in 2003, as "Stem (Daimyō Asobi-hen)" (茎(STEM)～大名遊ビ編～; "The Daimyō's fun version") as her 8th single and it was released on January 22, 2003 by Toshiba EMI / Virgin Music. The single version is sung in English, and was orchestrated by Toshiyuki Mori. The B-sides "Meisai" and "Ishiki" were arranged by Bakeneko Killer, a production team Sheena and Inoue formed. Nobuyoshi Araki, the prominent photographer, took the album cover.

The version featured on the album Kalk Samen Kuri no Hana, "Kuki" (茎), is sung in Japanese and arranged by Bakeneko Killer. A further version found on the vinyl edition of Kalk Samen Kuri no Hana called "Stem" (茎(STEM)), featured the album arrangement with English lyrics. It was also featured on the film Casshern's official album Our Last Day: Casshern Official Album. An English language version of "Stem" also appears on Sheena's 2007 soundtrack Heisei Fūzoku, orchestrated by Neko Saito.

The song was used as the theme song for Sheena's short film Hyakuiro Megane (百色眼鏡; "Kaleidoscope"), released in January 2003. It was also the theme song for the stage play Lens that was based on the film, which was held at the Sunshine Theater from July 5 to July 11 at Tokyo, and at the Theater Drama City from July 24 to July 25 in Osaka.

== Track listing ==
All tracks are written by Ringo Sheena. Track 2 is translated into English by Robbie Clark.

CD
No.	Title	Arranger(s)	Length
1.	"Meisai~Sengo Saidai-kyū no Bōfū-u Kennai Kashō~ (迷彩～戦後最大級ノ暴風雨圏内歌唱～, Camouflage~A Song From One of the Greatest Rainstorms of The Post-war Era~)"	Bakeneko Killer	3:11
2.	"Kuki (STEM)~Daimyo Asobi hen~ (茎(STEM)〜大名遊ビ編〜, Stem (STEM)~At Play With a Feudal Lord~)"	orchestrated by Toshiyuki Mori	4:20
3.	"Ishiki~Sengo Saidai-kyū no Bōfū-u Kennai Kashō~ (意識～戦後最大級ノ暴風雨圏内歌唱～, Consciousness~A Song From One of the Greatest Rainstorms of The Post-war Era~)"	Bakeneko Killer	3:13
Total length:			10:44

== Personnel ==
M2 / Ōoku Kinen Orchestra (大奥記念オーケストラ, Ōoku Memorial Orchestra): orchestra

- Conductor: Goto Yuichiro

M1, 3 / Himitsu Butai (秘密部隊, Secret Corps): rock band

- Vocals, Percussion: Ringo Sheena
- Electric guitars (Fender Telecaster): Ryosuke Nagaoka (Ukigumo)
- Drums: Ahito Inazawa (from Vola and the Oriental Machine, ex-Number Girl)
- Electric bass guitars, Contrabass: Hitoshi Watanabe
- Shinobue: Hideyo Takakuwa
- Violin: Neko Saito
- Didgeridoo: Tab Zombie (from Soil & "Pimp" Sessions)

=== Music video cast ===
Kuki (STEM)

- Actress - Kaede Katsuragi: Koyuki (actress)
- Student aspiring novelist - Amagi: Kentaro Kobayashi (actor)
- Detective - Komagata: Nao Omori (actor)
- A woman: Ringo Sheena

Meisai

- Maid & singer: Ringo Sheena
- Student: Kazuki Yamaguchi (Toshiba-EMI director)
- Aristocrat: Ryosuke Nagaoka
- Aristocrat: Ahito Inazawa
- Aristocrat: Neko Saito
- Aristocrat: Hitoshi Watanabe
- Aristocrat: Atsuhide Tsukuda (music planning company BEA)
- Fake Ringo Sheena: Keiko Yokomachi (actress)
