= Utaite Myōri: Sono Ichi =

- Kame Pact cover.

Studio album by Ringo Sheena
- Released: May 27, 2002
- Genre: Avant-pop; garage rock
- Length: 67:38
- Language: Japanese; English; French; German; Portuguese
- Label: Toshiba EMI; Virgin Music
- Producer: Uni Inoue; Masashi Kudo

Ringo Sheena chronology
Ze-Chyou Syuu (2000)	Utaite Myōri: Sono Ichi (2002)	Kalk Samen Kuri no Hana (2003)

Alternative cover
- Mori Pact cover.

Utaite Myōri: Sono Ichi (唄ひ手冥利 ～其ノ壱～), also known as A Favor of Duty Part 1, is the first cover album by Japanese singer and songwriter Ringo Sheena, released on May 27, 2002, by Toshiba EMI. The album is a set of two discs. It has sold over 409,000 copies since its release and was certified Platinum by the RIAJ.

== Background ==
This album is Ringo Sheena's first work after her maternity leave of one year and two months. It wasn't clear whether she was going to return to the entertainment world, so Toshiba EMI intended to release her greatest hits album at first to fulfill the number of CDs in the contract term. Sheena herself said in a TV appearance: "I even thought that I would retire during my maternity leave," but she ended up deciding against that plan, so this cover album was released as a compromise.

The album consists of songs originally written by musicians that influenced Sheena until that point. Sheena usually writes her lyrics and music herself, but she devoted herself to being just "a singer" this time. She entrusted the arrangement to Seiji Kameda, who arranged her first and second album, and Toshiyuki Mori, who arranged her third album. She selected famous songs that had an influence on her and ordered them to arrange these songs in her own way.

Sheena parodied the names of the album's arrangers in the titles of the two discs; Kame-pact Disc and Mori-pact Disc. Kame-pact Disc was recorded in the garage rock style she used to record in earlier in her career because of a lack of budget. On Mori-pact Disc, a music sequencer is used and multitrack recording is adopted, which was also used on her third album.

The album jacket is designed by Sheena and Yumi Ota, an employee of Sheena's private office. Sheena was in charge of the photographs and illustrations in the booklet, and she designed the lettering with Ryosuke Nagaoka (Ukigmo). The model on the album cover is Hisako Tabuchi.

Four guest singers participated in each disc, all of which are acquaintances of Sheena. Masamune Kusano is from the same town as her, and he is a senior in her elder brother's high school. Nao Matsuzaki is a friend of Sheena. Hikaru Utada, another friend of Sheena, sang the same song with Sheena at the Toshiba EMI Party before, which was distributed in Japan by Napster. Junpei Shiina is her elder brother.

Sheena arranged one bonus track for each disc.

== Track listing ==
Disc 1: Kame-pact Disc (亀パクトディスク) All tracks arranged by Seiji Kameda, except "Nobara" by Ringo Sheena.
No.	Title	Lyrics	Music	Original artist	Length
1.	"Haiiro no Hitomi (灰色の瞳, Grey Eyes)" (featuring Masamune Kusano)	Tito Veliz; Tokiko Kato	Uña Ramos	Tokiko Kato and Kiyoshi Hasegawa	4:24
2.	"More"	Marcello Ciorciolini; Norman Newell	Riz Ortolani; Nino Oliviero	Andy Williams	3:34
3.	"Chiisana Konomi (小さな木の実, Small Fruits)"	Hiroshi Unno	Bizet		3:35
4.	"I Wanna Be Loved by You"	Bert Kalmar	Herbert Stothart; Harry Ruby	Helen Kane	1:44
5.	"Shiroi Kobato (白い小鳩, White Dove)"	Michio Yamagami	Shunichi Tokura	Shuri Eiko	3:39
6.	"Love Is Blind"	Janis Ian	Ian	Ian	3:34
7.	"Momen no Handkerchief (木綿のハンカチーフ, Cotton Handkerchief)" (featuring Nao Matsuzaki)	Takashi Matsumoto	Kyōhei Tsutsumi	Hiromi Ōta	6:00
8.	"Yer Blues"	John Lennon; Paul McCartney	Lennon; McCartney	The Beatles	4:13
9.	"Heidenröslein (野薔薇, Wild Roses)" (special thanks track)	Goethe	Schubert		2:11

Disc 2: Mori-pact Disc (森パクトディスク) All tracks arranged by Toshiyuki Mori, except "Komori Uta" by Sheena.
No.	Title	Lyrics	Music	Original artist	Length
1.	"Ich Liebe Dich (君を愛す, I Love You)"	Hans Christian Andersen	Edvard Grieg	Carmen Dragon	3:13
2.	"Jazz a Go Go"	Robert Gall	Alain Goraguer	France Gall	2:38
3.	"Autumn Leaves (枯葉, Kareha)"	Jacques Prévert	Joseph Kosma	Edith Piaf	6:30
4.	"I Won't Last a Day Without You" (featuring Hikaru Utada)	Roger Nichols; Paul Williams	Nichols; Williams	Carpenters	4:22
5.	"Manhã de Carnaval (黒いオルフェ, Kuroi orufe)"	Antônio Maria de Araújo Morais; Francois Llenas; Marcel Camus; George David Weiss; Hugo Peretti; Luigi Creatore	Luiz Bonfá		4:51
6.	"Mr. Wonderful"	Jerry Bock; Weiss; Larry Holofcener	Bock; Weiss; Holofcener	Peggy Lee	3:20
7.	"The Onion Song (玉葱のハッピーソング, Tamanegi no happīsongu)" (featuring Junpei Shiina)	Nickolas Ashford; Valerie Simpson	Ashford; Simpson	Marvin Gaye	3:21
8.	"Starting Over"	John Lennon	John Lennon	John Lennon	3:51
9.	"Lullaby (子守唄, Komori-uta)" (special thanks track)	Sheena	Sheena; Chopin		2:50

Notes:

- "Haiiro no Hitomi" is Tokiko Kato and Kiyoshi Hasegawa's cover version of Uña Ramos' "Aquellos ojos grises."
- "Chiisana Konomi" is adapted from the serenade in Bizet's opera La jolie fille de Perth.
- "I Wanna Be Loved By You" is Marilyn Monroe's cover version of the song of the same name originally recorded by Helen Kane.
- "Lullaby" contains an excerpt from Chopin's "Grande valse brillante" Op.34 No.2 in A minor.

== Credits and personnel ==
=== Disc 1: Kame-pact Disc ===
Gyakutai Glycogen (虐待グリコゲン, Abuse Glycogen)

- Junji Yayoshi: electric guitar, acoustic guitar
- Seiji Kameda: electric bass guitar
- Makoto Minagawa: piano, organ, melodica, synthesizer, tambourine
- Masayuki Muraishi: drums, cowbell
- Nobuhiko Nakayama: music sequencer (tracks #2 and #3)
- Chieko Kinbara: strings (track #6)

Additional personnel

- Masamune Kusano: guest vocals (track #1)
- Nao Matsuzaki; guest vocals (track #7)
- several assistants: handclaps and footsteps (track #3)

=== Disc 2: Mori-pact Disc ===
Bōtoku Vitamin (冒涜ヴァイタミン, Blasphemy Vitamin)

- Toshiyuki Mori: music sequencer, keyboard, bass synthesizer, electric guitar (track #1)
- Hitoshi Watanabe: double bass, electric bass guitar
- Takashi Numazawa: drums, tambourine
- Uni Inoue: finger snapping (track #3)

Additional personnel

- Hikaru Utada: guest vocals (track #4)
- Junpei Shiina; guest vocals (track #7)
- several others: finger snapping (track #3)
