= Kalk Samen Kuri no Hana =

Kalk Samen Kuri no Hana 加爾基 精液 栗ノ花

Studio album by Ringo Sheena
- Released: February 23, 2003
- Recorded: Toshiba EMI 3rd Studio; Studio Terra; Kroneko Studio; Tokyo Opera City Concert Hall; Kajika-sou Waraku-tei, Atami (ryokan)
- Genre: Avant-pop; progressive pop
- Length: 44:44
- Label: Toshiba EMI; Virgin Music
- Producer: Bakeneko Killer (Note: Japanese: 化猫キラー; a pseudonym for Ringo Sheena and Uni Inoue.)

Ringo Sheena chronology
Utaite Myōri: Sono Ichi (2002)	Kalk Samen Kuri no Hana 加爾基 精液 栗ノ花 (2003)	Heisei Fūzoku (2007)

Singles from Karuki Samen Kuri no Hana
- 1. "Stem" Released: January 22, 2003

Kalk Samen Kuri no Hana (Japanese: 加爾基(カルキ) 精液(ザーメン) 栗(クリ)ノ花(ハナ)) (Note: Japanese karuki is a loanword from Dutch Kalk (lime) and an abbreviation of kuroru karuki (クロルカルキ) from Dutch chloorkalk (calcium hypochlorite), which has a strong chlorine smell. It is rendered in the song title with ateji, meaning that its composite kanji serve only a phonetic purpose. Samen, usually read as seieki, is transliterated as zāmen, derived from the German Samen (semen).) also known as Kalk Samen Chestnut Flower and Chlorine, Semen, Chestnut Flower, is the third studio album by Japanese singer-songwriter Ringo Sheena, released on February 23, 2003, on Toshiba EMI and Virgin Music. The album's lead single was a massive success, topping the Oricon charts for the first time in her career.

EMI released the album using CCCD at first. Then, the CCCD version was stopped producing, and the CD-DA version was newly released on July 2, 2008. The 2LP vinyl record version was released on May 27, 2003 and contains the bonus track "Fig Flower" (Note: Japanese: 映日紅の花, Hepburn: Ichijiku no hana).

The short film Kaleidoscope: A Short Film (Note: 短篇キネマ 百色眼鏡, Tanpen Kinema Hyakuiro Megane) acts as a visual accompaniment to the album and was released prior to the album on January 22, 2003.

== Background and recording ==
Kalk Samen Kuri no Hana was released hot off of the success of Sheena's sophomore album Shōso Strip (2000) as well as her self-cover album Utaite Myōri: Sono Ichi (2002). The album was originally titled Wonderful, Vulgar, Eccentric (Note: 不思議・猥雑・エキセントリック, Fushigi, Waizatsu, Ekisentorikku). (Note: In an interview that was played in the special program for the album by Space Shower TV, Sheena revealed that "Kalk" was "Wonder", "Semen" was "Vulgar" and "Chestnut Flower" was "Eccentric".) However, she decided to change the title at the last minute after being intrigued by an argument she overheard between two male staff members on her team, who bickered over whether the smell of semen more resembled the smell of chlorine or the smell of the chestnut flowers. She thought that the nuance of the word "semen" was beautiful, and adapted it to the original title, explaining that "Kalk" (calcium hypochlorite) fit into the original first word of "Wonder", while "Semen" fit "Vulgar", and "Chestnut Flower" fit with "Eccentric". The 2001 single "Mayonaka Wa Junketsu" (真夜中は純潔, Midnight is pure) was to have been included on the album along with one of the single's b-sides, "Aisaika no Choushoku" (愛妻家の朝食, The breakfast of the devoted husband), however these tracks were dropped on the basis of not thematically fitting in with the rest of the album.

Kalk Samen Kuri no Hana saw Sheena producing a major release all by herself for the first time in her career, as opposed to working with her usual collaborators and producer Seiji Kameda. The album allegedly took her an extra year to produce than her previous two studio albums did. Sheena chose to not record a band all at once as she had done on previous albums, choosing to instead record one instrument at a time by overdubbing and multitracking and layering the instruments. Musically, the album combines both the standard instrumentation of a rock band as well as various other musical instruments, including folk instruments from Japan and other regions, string instruments, wind instruments, percussion instruments, as well as music sequencer and a full orchestra. In order to reduce budgets, she used her own Macintosh computer and cheap recording equipment to compose and edit the songs by herself using computer software, while sometimes exchanging the arranged songs with Uni Inoue. She recorded one musical instrument in one room of her house while recording the ensemble parts (string section, etc.) in another room.

Seiji Kameda, who had been involved in the production and arrangement of her previous two studio albums did not participate in the album. Instead, Sheena arranged the album with audio engineer Uni Inoue. Toshiyuki Mori orchestrated each of the recorded songs and arranged the entirety of "Yattsuke Shigoto".

The song titles and their places in the tracklist continue a pattern seen on Sheena's first two albums where each song title symmetrically parallels the opposite side of the tracklist. For instance, tracks 1 and 11 are written with exactly two kanji, tracks 2 and 10 are written with eight katakana characters, and so on.

== Reception ==
Kalk Samen Kuri no Hana was ranked second in CNN International Asia's list of "the 2000s' most under-appreciated Japanese music of the last decade" on December 22, 2009. Sheena also received a mention in The Guardian as one of Japan's artists who "deserve to be seen and heard in the west" in 2010.

== Track listing ==
All tracks written by Ringo Sheena; all tracks arranged by Sheena and Uni Inoue (credited as "Bakeneko Killer"), except "Rush Job" by Toshiyuki Mori, and "Fig Flower" by Ukigumo.

Track listing symmetry
01. 宗教; Religion	11. 葬列; Funeral
02. ドッペルゲンガー; Doppelganger	10. ポルターガイスト; Poltergeist
03. 迷彩; Camouflage	09. 意識; Consciousness
04. おだいじに; Please Take Care	08. おこのみで; As You Wish
05. やっつけ仕事; Rush Job	07. とりこし苦労; Needless Worry
06. 茎 Stem

No.	Title	Length
1.	"Religion" (宗教 Shūkyō)	5:08
2.	"Doppelganger" (ドッペルゲンガー Dopperugengā)	3:46
3.	"Camouflage" (迷彩 Meisai)	3:44
4.	"Please Take Care" (おだいじに Odaiji ni)	3:01
5.	"Rush Job" (やっつけ仕事 Yattsuke Shigoto)	5:08
6.	"Stem" (茎 Kuki)	3:50
7.	"Needless Worry" (とりこし苦労 Torikoshi Kurō)	2:36
8.	"As You Wish" (おこのみで Okonomi de)	5:45
9.	"Consciousness" (意識 Ishiki)	2:45
10.	"Poltergeist" (ポルターガイスト Porutāgaisuto)	3:41
11.	"Funeral" (葬列 Sōretsu)	5:12
Total length:		44:44

Vinyl edition bonus track
No.	Title	Length
12.	"Fig Flower" (映日紅の花 Ichijiku no Hana)	4:32
Total length:		49:16

== Credits and personnel ==
- All English translation and pronunciation guidance: Robbie Clark

Track 1 and 11

- Chestnut Flower Fragrance Orchestra (Note: 栗ノ花薫香るオーケストラ, Kuri no hana kaeru ōkesutora): orchestral music
- Yuichiro Goto: conductor
- Kazuhiro Momo (from Mo'some Tonebender): electric guitars
- Junji Ikehata: drums
- Toshiyuki Mori: pipe organ
- Uni Inoue: electric bass guitars, hurdy-gurdy, mandolin, lute, sitar, Fender B.Bender (3-stringed), drum machine
- Ringo Sheena: vocal, koto (Ikuta style), distortion koto (her own way), pipe organ

Track 2 and 10

- Chestnut Flower Fragrance Orchestra: orchestral music
- Yuichiro Goto: conductor
- Ringo Sheena: vocal
- Uni Inoue: Mellotron, electric bass guitars

Track 3 and 9

- Himitsu Butai: the band
- Ringo Sheena: vocal, bandmaster, percussion
- Ukigumo: electric guitars (Fender Telecaster)
- Ahito Inazawa: drums
- Hitoshi Watanabe: electric bass guitars, contrabass
- Hideyo Takakuwa: shinobue (篠笛, bamboo flute)
- Neko Saito: violin
- Tabu (from Soil & "Pimp" Sessions): Didgeridoo

Track 4 and 8

- Kotaro Saito: cello
- Junko Minobe: viola
- Youkan Mizue: conch and other wind instruments
- Yumi Ōta: the voice of the announcement
- Uni Inoue: electric bass guitars, electric guitars, electronic drum
- Ringo Sheena: vocal, prepared piano, acoustic piano, Erhu (二胡, Chinese instrument with two strings)

Track 5

- Ōoku Kinen Orchestra: orchestral music
- Yuichiro Goto: conductor
- Toshiyuki Mori: piano, all works
- Ringo Sheena: vocal, koto (Ikuta style), distortion koto (her own way), pipe organ
- Ukigumo: vacuum cleaner (her elder brother Shiina Junpei's wife's possessions)

Track 6

- Josei-jōi Kinen Orchestra: string section
- Chieko Kinpara party: string quintet
- Kanako Tsuruta: drums
- Uni Inoue: electric bass guitar
- Ringo Sheena: vocal, koto (Ikuta style), piano

Track 7

- Ukigumo: vocal percussion
- Toshiyuki Mori: Cornet
- Uni Inoue: electric bass guitar
- Ringo Sheena: vocal, koto (Ikuta style), shamisen, melodica, alto recorder, kalimba, harmonium, jaw harp, whistle, piano, drums, electric guitars

Track 12

- Ringo Sheena: vocal
- Ukigumo: acoustic guitars
- Uni Inoue: bass
