= Ringo Sheena production discography =

Japanese singer-songwriter Ringo Sheena has produced many songs for other artists, as well as collaborating as a musical director for projects. The following is a list of songs that feature songwriting and/or song production by Ringo Sheena. In 2014, Sheena released an album compiling self-covers of several of these songs, called Gyakuyunyū: Kōwankyoku.

== Songs produced for other artists ==
List of songs that feature songwriting or production by Ringo Sheena. All songs have lyrics and music written by Sheena unless stated.
Title	Year	Album	Notes
"Private" (Ryōko Hirosue)	1998	Private	Originally appeared on the "Jeans" single.
"Cappuccino" (Rie Tomosaka)	1999	Murasaki.	Released as a single.
"Mokuren no Cream" (木蓮のクリーム; "Magnolia Cream") (Rie Tomosaka)	1999	Murasaki.	Originally appeared on the "Cappuccino" single, additional whistling by Sheena.
"Shampoo" (シャンプー, Shampū) (Rie Tomosaka)	1999	Murasaki.	Additional piano by Sheena.
"Shōjo Robot" (少女ロボット; "Girl Robot") (Rie Tomosaka)	2000	Rie Tomosaka Best +3	Released as a single, additional piano and chorus by Sheena.
"Ikenai Ko" (いけない子; "Bad Kid") (Rie Tomosaka)	2000	Rie Tomosaka Best +3	Originally appeared on the "Shōjo Robot" single, additional piano by Sheena.
"Nippon ni Umarete" (日本に生まれて; "Born in Japan") (Rie Tomosaka)	2000	Rie Tomosaka Best +3	Originally appeared on the "Shōjo Robot" single, additional piano and song arrangement by Sheena.
"Amagasa" (雨傘; "Rain Umbrella") (Tokio)	2008	17	Released as a single, arrangement performed with Tokyo Jihen.
"Kachū no Otoko" (渦中の男; "Vortex Boy") (Tokio)	2008	—	Arrangement performed with Tokyo Jihen.
"Hiyori Hime" (日和姫; "Weather Princess") (Puffy)	2009	Bring It!	Released as a single, arrangement performed with Tokyo Jihen.
"Shuen no Onna" (主演の女; "Leading Lady") (Puffy)	2009	Bring It!	
"Tokai no Manner" (都会のマナー; "Urban Manners") (Rie Tomosaka)	2009	Toridori.	Arrangement performed with Tokyo Jihen, additional chorus by Sheena.
"Kodomo no Jōkei" (子供の情憬; "A Scene of Children") (Rie Tomosaka)	2009	Toridori.	Arrangement performed with Ichiyo Izawa.
"Oishii Kisetsu" (おいしい季節; "The Tasty Season") (Chiaki Kuriyama)	2011	Circus	Released as a single, arrangement performed with Tokyo Jihen, additional chorus by Sheena.
"Ketteiteki Sanpunkan" (決定的三分間; "The Decisive Three Minutes") (Chiaki Kuriyama)	2011	Circus	Released as a single, arrangement performed with Tokyo Jihen, additional synths by Sheena.
"Tsukiyo no Shōzō" (月夜の肖像; "Portrait of the Moonlit Night") (Chiaki Kuriyama)	2011	Circus	Released as a single, arrangement performed with Tokyo Jihen.
"Seishun no Matataki" (青春の瞬き; "Flicker of Youth") (Chiaki Kuriyama)	2011	Circus	Originally appeared on "Tsuki no Shōzō" single, arrangement performed with Tokyo Jihen.
"Manatsu no Datsugokusha" (真夏の脱獄者; "Midsummer Escaped Prisoner") (SMAP)	2012	Gift of SMAP	
"Wakare 1940" (別れ; "Separation") (Ichigo Ichie)	2012	Dokuichigo	Lyrics by Hideki Noda, co-written by Sheena.
"The Heavy Metallic Girl" (Ichigo Ichie)	2012	Dokuichigo	Lyrics by Noda, co-written by Sheena, arrangement by Sheena.
"Sōshitsu" (喪失; "Defeat") (Ichigo Ichie)	2012	Dokuichigo	Lyrics by Noda, co-written by Sheena, arrangement by Sheena.
"Wakare 1964" (Ichigo Ichie)	2012	Dokuichigo	Lyrics by Noda, co-written by Sheena.
"What Did U Say?" (Ichigo Ichie)	2012	Dokuichigo	Lyrics by Noda, co-written by Sheena.
"Bōenkyō no Naka no Kioku" (望遠鏡の中の記憶; "Memories Inside of the Telescope") (Ichigo Ichie)	2012	Dokuichigo	Lyrics by Noda, co-written by Sheena.
"Bōenkyō no Soto no Keshiki" (望遠鏡の外の景色; "View Outside of the Telescope") (Ichigo Ichie)	2012	Dokuichigo	Lyrics by Noda, co-written by Sheena.
"Wakare 2012" (Ichigo Ichie)	2012	Dokuichigo	Lyrics by Noda, co-written by Sheena.
"Saisakizaka" (幸先坂; "Fortune Hill Road") (Yōko Maki)	2013	—	Released as a single.
"An'ya no Shinjūtate" (暗夜の心中立て; "Dark Night Promise") (Sayuri Ishikawa)	2014	X: Cross II	Released as a single.
"Naute no Dorobōneko" (名うての泥棒猫; "The Celebrated Cat Burglar") (Sayuri Ishikawa)	2014	X: Cross II	Originally appeared on the "An'ya no Shinjūtate" single, music video produced for the song.
"Saihate ga Mitai" (最果てが見たい; "I Want to See the Very End") (Sayuri Ishikawa)	2014	X: Cross II	
"Karei Naru Gyakushū" (華麗なる逆襲; "Magnificent Counterattack") (SMAP)	2015	—	Released as a single, theme song of the drama Zeni no Sensō.
"Yasei no Dōmei" (野性の同盟; "Wild Alliance") (Ko Shibasaki)	2015	—	Released as a single, theme song of the drama Kasouken no Onna.
"Uchū no Kioku" (宇宙の記憶; "Memories of the Universe") (Maaya Sakamoto)	2018	Single Collection+ Achikochi	Released as a single, theme song of the anime BEM.

== Music director ==
Title	Year	Type	Notes
Hyakuiro Megane (百色眼鏡; "Kaleidoscope")	2003	film	40-minute film based on her album Kalk Samen Kuri no Hana (2003), featuring music from the album. "Stem (Daimyō Asobi-hen)" acts as the theme song, and the songs "Doppelganger", "Odaiji ni", "Yattsuke Shigoto", "Torikoshi Gurō" and "Poltergeist" feature as incidental music.
Lens	2004	stage play	The play was produced by Kentaro Kobayashi and was presented in July 2004. Lens is an adaptation of Hyakuiro Megane.
Sakuran	2007	film	Sheena was a music director of this film. Tokyo Jihen and guitarist Kiyoshi Hasegawa, etc. participated in production. Some music was not recorded on any albums because an official soundtrack was not produced.
Sannin Kichisa (三人吉三)	2007	Kabuki	Sannin Kichisa is the program of the 8th performance of the Cocoon Kabuki which performed at the Theater Cocoon in Shibuya which is the town of youth culture to popularize kabuki. It was presented from June 7 to 28, 2007. She produced a part of music in the play and the ending theme "Tamatebako" (玉手箱; "Casket").: Personnel; Vocals: Ringo Sheena; Guitars: Yukio Nagoshi (名越由貴夫, Nagoshi Yukio); Bass guitars: Jungo Miura (三浦淳悟, Miura Jungo), a.k.a. "Jumbo" (from Petrolz)
Egg	2012	stage play	The play was produced by Noda Map which Hideki Noda, dramatist, theatre director, manages. It was presented from September 5 to October 28. The album Doku Ichigo (毒苺; "Poison Strawberry") which contains eight songs (Noda wrote, Sheena composed and Eri Fukatsu lead in the play sang) was released on August 31, 2012.
