= Gyakuyunyū: Kōwankyoku =

Studio album by Ringo Sheena
- Released: May 27, 2014
- Recorded: 2013–2014
- Genre: Pop; rock; digital hardcore; punk rock; jazz; funk
- Length: 41:45
- Language: Japanese; English; Spanish
- Label: EMI Records Japan (EMI R)
- Producer: Ringo Sheena

Ringo Sheena chronology
Ukina; Mitsugetsu-shō (2013)	Gyakuyunyū: Kōwankyoku (2014)	Hi Izuru Tokoro (2014)

Singles from Gyakuyunyū
- 1. "Seishun no Matataki" Released: May 14, 2014

Gyakuyunyū: Kōwankyoku (逆輸入 ～港湾局～; "Reimport: Ports and Harbours Bureau") is an album by Japanese musician Ringo Sheena, released on May 27, 2014. It is a self-cover album, featuring new recordings of songs that Sheena wrote for other artists.

Each song also collaborates with a different famous Japanese music producer. Gyakuyunyū was the final release of Sheena's 15th anniversary celebrations, released on the day marking 16 years since her debut single "Kōfukuron".

"Gyakuyunyū" (逆輸入, literally "reverse import", commonly rendered as "reimport") in the title refers to the act of reimporting products that were once exported to another country, and by extension, it also applies to culture and technology. Editor/Writer Masaki Uchida offered further explanation in the liner notes that "reimported" products are often regarded as containing rare items, as they are originally manufactured in accordance with the market conditions and regulatory frameworks of their export destinations or production sites. Consequently, their specifications and performance often diverge from those of domestically marketed counterparts. Such differences may manifest in distinctive outputs, designs, or color variations in automobiles, motorcycles, apparel, wristwatches, and consumer electronics, thereby creating opportunities for enthusiasts to encounter items of substantial or exceptional rarity.

== Background and development ==
The album had been a planned release by Sheena for several years, at least as far back as 2010 and 2011, when she was recording music with Chiaki Kuriyama. Gyakuyunyū: Kōwankyoku was released as a part of Ringo Sheena's 15th anniversary celebrations. This was after the single "Irohanihoheto/Kodoku no Akatsuki" and two albums released on November 13, 2013: Ukina, a collaboration compilation album and Mitsugetsu-shō, a live compilation album. Also released on November 13 were The Sexual Healing Total Care Course 120min. and Live, two box sets compiling all of her visual media. Several days after, Sheena held a series of concerts at the Orchard Hall in Tokyo called Tōtaikai: Heisei Nijūgo-nen Kaneyama-chō Taikai (党大会 平成二十五年神山町大会; "The Party Convention: 2013 Kamiyama Event") on November 18, 19, 20, 25 and 26. Two additional concerts for Sheena's fanclub called Hantaikai: Heisei Nijūgo-nen Hamarikyū Taikai (班大会 平成二十五年浜離宮大会; "The Squad Convention: 2013 Hamarikyū Event") were held on November 28 and 29 at the Hamarikyu Asahi Hall in Tokyo. The November 26 concert was later released on DVD on March 19, 2014.

Since her debut in 1998, Sheena has written songs for other musicians, starting with Ryōko Hirosue and Rie Tomosaka between 1998 and 2000. After a break of eight years, she began producing music for other musicians again, beginning with boyband Tokio's single "Amagasa". She worked with actress and musician Chiaki Kuriyama on four songs, with three becoming singles: "Oishii Kisetsu", "Ketteiteki Sanpunkan" and "Tsukiyo no Shōzō".

On Ukina, Sheena asked electronic producer Yasutaka Nakata to arrange her song "Netsuai Hakkakuchū" for the album. This was the first time Sheena had collaborated with Nakata, and a rare collaboration with an electronic producer.

Before the release of the album, Sheena collaborated with enka singer Sayuri Ishikawa, writing and producing three songs for her album X: Cross II: "An'ya no Shinjūdate", "Naute no Dorobōneko" and "Saihate ga Mitai". "An'ya no Shinjūdate" was released as a single on April 2, while the album was released on April 23. The pair performed the songs "An'ya no Shinjūdate" and "Naute no Dorobōneko" together on the NHK program Songs on April 12, 2014. None of these songs appear on Gyakuyunyū: Kōwankyoku.

Sheena previously performed the songs "Private", and "Cappuccino" in a grunge style at her Jisaku Jien Nama Jitsuenkai and Kōkotsu Gokuhi Ensōkai concerts in June 1999. She performed "Seishun no Matataki" at Tokyo Jihen's Bon Voyage concerts in 2012, and "Saisakizaka" as the final song at her Tōtaikai concerts in 2013.

== Writing and production ==
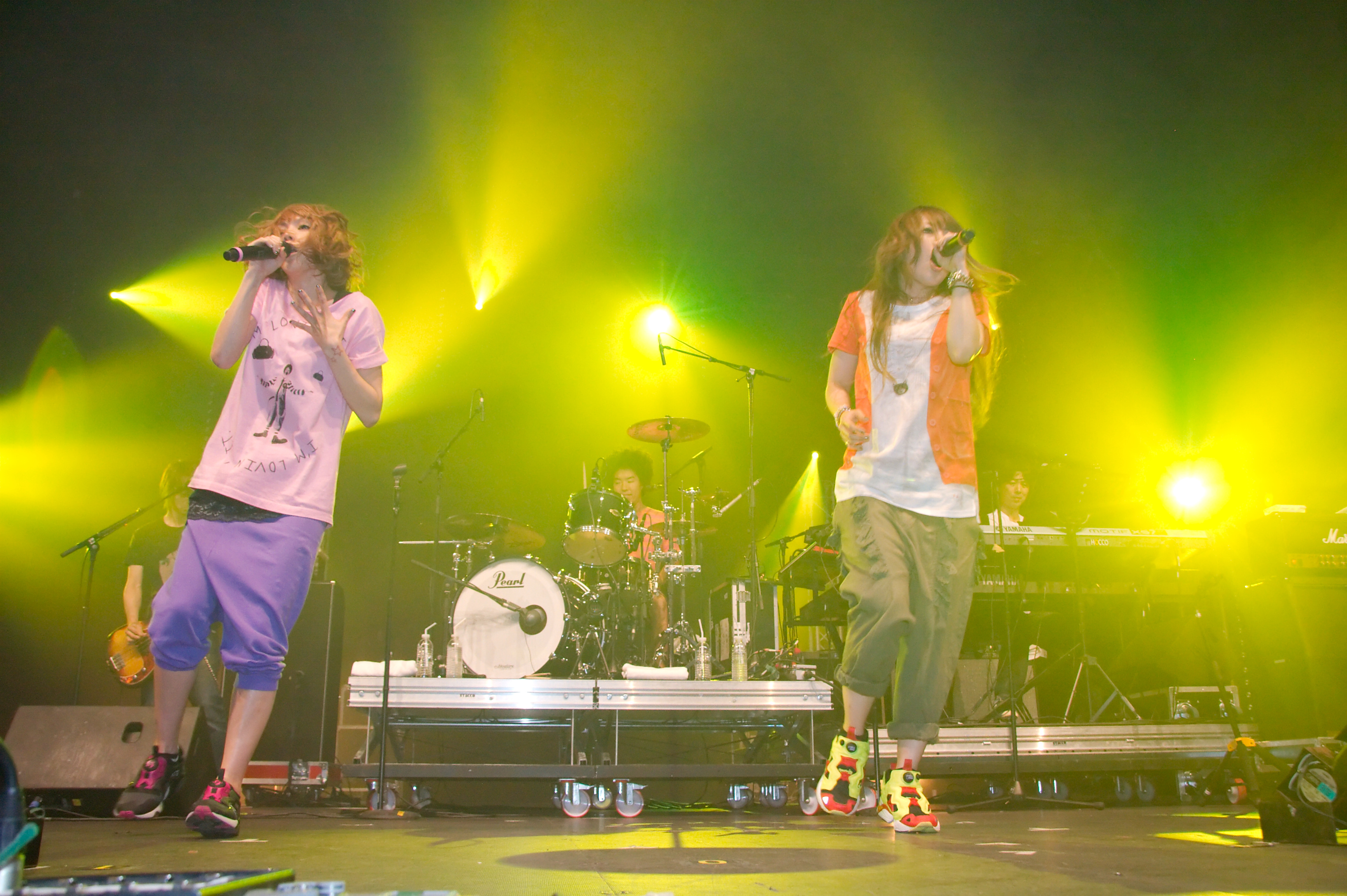
Sheena recorded two songs she had initially given to Puffy AmiYumi in 2008 and 2009: "Hiyori Hime" and "Shuen no Onna".

Gyakuyunyū: Kōwankyoku is a selection of 11 out of the 25 songs written for other musicians by Sheena between 1998 and 2013. A self-cover album was something her fanclub members had requested the most, so decided her 15th anniversary was the best time to release such an album. Included was her first song given to another singer, Ryōko Hirosue, which was released after her second single "Kabukichō no Joō" in 1998. Out of the eight songs written for Rie Tomosaka, Sheena covered one, "Cappuccino". Sheena covered both songs written for Tokio in 2008, and both songs written for Puffy AmiYumi in 2009. Out of the four songs written for Chiaki Kuriyama, Sheena chose "Ketteiteki Sanpunkan" and "Seishun no Matataki". She also covered the song "Manatsu no Datsugokusha", written for boyband SMAP in 2012. Sheena was inspired by SMAP's dance atmosphere in their live concerts to write the song. As well as this, Sheena covered "Saisakizaka", a song she had given actress Yōko Maki to perform for the film The Ravine of Goodbye in 2013. The remaining song "Bōenkyō no Soto no Keshiki" was written for Hideki Noda's stage play Egg, which was held from September 5 to October 28, 2012. It was one of seven songs written for the play, performed by Eri Fukatsu under the moniker Ichigo Ichie. Sheena had written this song in the style of a Burt Bacharach waltz. As it appears on Gyakuyunyū: Kōwankyoku, "Bōenkyō no Soto no Keshiki" is almost entirely an instrumental. Sheena decided to record the songs she had given Tokio and SMAP in English, as the lyrics were written using words that men would use, which Sheena felt would sound odd coming from her.

Each song features a collaborating producer, all of whom were men. Sheena decided to pick musicians who she had learnt things from about the world of J-Pop, which she was unfamiliar with when she debuted. An exception was Kenichi Maeyamada, who she saw as developing a new sound in Japanese music. Most of the musicians she had not met before, including Takeshi Kobayashi, Maeyamada, Shinichi Osawa, Otomo Yoshihide and Negishi Takamune. She had met Takeshi Ueda at the Rising Sun Rock Festival in 1999, and Tōru Hidaka from Beat Crusaders before, but had not collaborated with either before.

Of the collaborators she had worked with before, Nobuhiko Nakayama had acted as a programmer on Shōso Strip and had performed at Tokyo Jihen tours. Sheena had worked together with Keiichi Tomita on his Tomita Lab album Joyous, performing the songs "Yasashii Tetsugaku", "Tokai no Yoru, Watashi no Machi" and "Kono Yo wa Fushigi". The song "Yasashii Tetsugaku" was featured on her collaboration album Ukina (2013). Sheena had worked together with accordion player Yoshiaki Sato several times. He performed on her songs "Ringo no Uta" (2003), "Karisome Otome (Hitokuchizaka Ver.)" (2007) and "Karisome Otome (Tameikisannoh Ver.)" (2007), and was also a member of the backing band for her Tōtaikai concerts in 2013. His song "Your Son" was also sampled on "Saisakizaka". Sheena had also worked with Yoichi Murata on multiple occasions.

Originally, Sheena had planned on just sending demos to the producers, and then later seeing what they had come up with. However, the producers all requested to have meetings with Sheena instead. For the song "Private", Maeyamada listened to Hirosue's original version, then had a single meeting with Sheena about the song. Sheena had requested Maeyamada to "make it sparkle", as she felt uncomfortable singing the girly lyrics now that she was in her 30s. Maeyamada had the concept of a "strange amusement park" in mind, so raised the key and the tempo, and added "cheap-sounding" synths. He further added bowling and cuckoo clock sound effects to the song. The pair then mixed the song together at a later date.

The songs with Japanese titles were given European language titles for the album. "Seishun no Matataki" ("Le Moment") and "Saisakizaka" ("Fortune Hill Road") already received one during their initial release. "Ketteiteki Sanpunkan" was given the title "The Decisive 3min." in 2011, but for the album was re-titled "A Decisive 3 Minutes". "Shuen no Onna", "Kachū no Otoko", "Manatsu no Datsugokusha" and "Amagasa" were all given names in English ("Leading Lady", "In a Whirlwind", "Midsummer Fugitives" and "Umbrella" respectively), while "Hiyori Hime" was given the French title "Princesse Quotidienne". "Bōenkyō no Soto no Keshiki" was given the Spanish title "Paisaje", which was the first time Sheena used a Spanish language title.

== Recording ==
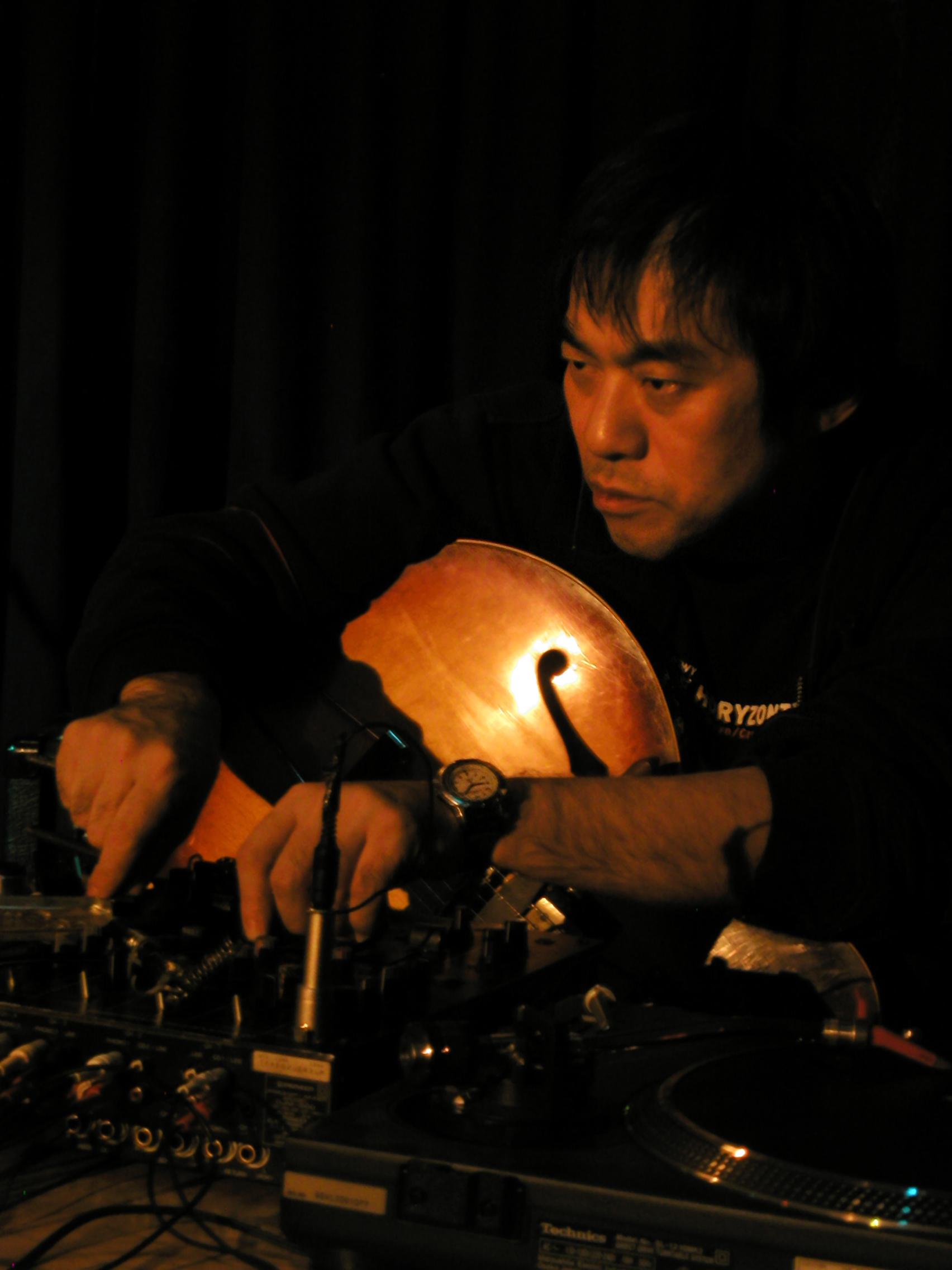
Otomo Yoshihide arranged the song "Shuen no Onna" with a 16 member brass band.

The album was recorded at Prime Sound Studio Form in Higashiyama, Meguro, Tokyo as well as at Sound Inn in Chiyoda, Tokyo. Additional instrument recordings were undertaken at private studios, such as Sweep-Zweep Studio and Non-Aggression Studio for "Kachū no Otoko," Samsa Studio for "Ketteiteki Sanpunkan" and Oorong Tokyo Studio for "Cappuccino."

"Shuen no Onna" was recorded with a 16 member brass band, dubbed the Otomo Yoshihide Special Big Band (大友良英スペシャルビッグバンド, Ōtomo Yoshihide Supesharu Biggu Bando). "Bōenkyō no Soto no Keshiki" was recorded with a 26-member band, featuring rock, jazz and classical instruments. Many of the players on the song previously worked on songs from Sanmon Gossip (2009). One collaborator was pianist Masanori Sasaji, who was a judge at the 5th Music Quest Japan in 1996, a contest that Sheena had entered at 17. It was the first time the pair had met in 18 years.

"Cappuccino" features guitars by music producer Yukio Nagoshi, who previously collaborated with Sheena at her concert Ringo Expo 08. Drummer Noriyasu Kawamura, who performed the drums in the three bands that performed the songs for Sheena's debut album Muzai Moratorium (1999), Momoiro Spanner, Zekkyō Solfeggio, Zetsurin Hectopascal, also makes an appearance on "Amagasa". Several musicians collaborated with Sheena for the first time on Gyakuyunyū. Shinichi Ubukata of the band Nothing's Carved in Stone (formerly the guitarist for Ellegarden) performed electric guitars on "Amagasa". For Sheena's collaboration with Tōru Hidaka on the song "Hiyori Hime", he enlisted Kazuma Koshikawa of his current band The Starbems, as well as Asparagus members Naou Hara and Masakazu Ichise.

== Promotion and release ==
To promote the release, Sheena performed a four date tour called Chotto Shita Recohatsu 2014 (ちょっとしたレコ発 2014; "A Little Release Party 2014"). The tour had two locations: Ōsanbashi Hall in the Port of Yokohama (May 26 and 27) and the Sankei Hall Breeze in Umeda, Osaka (June 5 and 6). The paid channel Wowow Premium broadcast a special program about Gyakuyunyū on May 25, and on May 27 broadcast her Yokohama concert live. Sheena performed 21 songs, including "Cappuccino", "Amagasa", "Seishun no Matataki", "Bōenkyō no Soto no Keshiki" and "Shuen no Onna" from the album, as well as a cover of Hikaru Utada's "Traveling".

Interviews with Sheena appeared in the magazines Rockin' On Japan and Switch, as well as online publication Natalie to promote the album. On the day of release, Sheena appeared on Miu Sakamoto's radio show Sakamoto Miu no DearFriends, and the next day on NHK FM's Music Line. Also on the 28th, the Fuji TV show Sakigake! Ongaku Banzuke: Eight broadcast an interview with Sheena about the album.

On May 14, the songs "Seishun no Matataki", "Private" and "Amagasa" were released on iTunes when the album was made available for pre-order. On the same day, a music video for "Seishun no Matataki" was released. "Seishun no Matataki" peaked on the Billboard Japan Hot 100 at number 41. "Private" also reached number 68 on the Adult Alternative Airplay chart, and "Cappuccino" at number 98. Sheena performed "Seishun no Matataki" at Music Station on May 30, 2014.

== Critical reception ==
What's In? Tomonori Shiba reviewer felt positively about the album, noting that even though it was a collection of older songs, the sound production is more indicative of the future than the past, with the songs being reborn in a new sound. Yamaha music critic Manabu Sakurai called the release "a hectic and fun album, maybe the height of variation," but also noting that every song had Sheena's personality carved into it.

The album's cover artwork was the winner of Music Jacket Award 2015, as voted on by members of the Recording Industry Association of Japan.

== Commercial reception ==
On the first day of sales, Gyakuyunyū: Kōwankyoku sold 17,000 copies, becoming the second most sold album that day, underneath Aiko's Awa no Yō na Ai Datta. The digital edition topped the iTunes top 100 albums the first day it was released. The album debuted at number 3 weekly, selling 31,000 copies.

== Track listing ==
Additional English lyrics translated by Robbie Clark, additional Spanish lyrics by Hikaru Iwakawa.

All music is composed by Ringo Sheena.

No.	Title	Lyrics	Arranger	Length
1.	"Shuen no Onna" (主演の女 "Leading Lady," Puffy AmiYumi (2009))	Ringo Sheena	Otomo Yoshihide	3:48
2.	"Kachū no Otoko" (渦中の男 "Vortex Boy," Tokio (2008))	R. Sheena, Robbie Clark	Takeshi Ueda	3:13
3.	"Private" (Ryōko Hirosue (1998))	R. Sheena	Kenichi Maeyamada	3:19
4.	"Seishun no Matataki" (Chiaki Kuriyama (2011))	R. Sheena	Keiichi Tomita	5:18
5.	"Manatsu no Datsugokusha" (真夏の脱獄者 "Midsummer Fugitives," SMAP (2012))	R. Sheena, R. Clark	Shinichi Osawa	3:29
6.	"Bōenkyō no Soto no Keshiki" (望遠鏡の外の景色 "View Outside of the Telescope," Eri Fukatsu (2012))	R. Sheena, H. Iwakawa	Yoichi Murata	4:34
7.	"Ketteiteki Sanpunkan" (Chiaki Kuriyama (2011))	R. Sheena, R. Clark	Nobuhiko Nakayama	3:00
8.	"Cappuccino" (Rie Tomosaka (1999))	R. Sheena	Takeshi Kobayashi	4:03
9.	"Amagasa" (Tokio (2008))	R. Sheena, R. Clark	Negishi Takamune	3:46
10.	"Hiyori Hime" (Puffy AmiYumi (2009))	R. Sheena	Tōru Hidaka	3:00
11.	"Saisakizaka" (Yōko Maki (2013))	R. Sheena	Yoshiaki Sato	4:15
Total length:				41:45

== Personnel ==
Credits were adapted from Ringo Sheena's official website.

Performers and musicians

- Ren Adachi – programming (#8)
- Hitomi Aikawa – vibraphone, glockenspiel (#1)
- Ryōta Azuma – baritone sax (#1)
- Ryoko Egawa – soprano sax (#1)
- Great Eida – violin (#6)
- Naoko Etō – piano (#1)
- Takeshi Hamano – violin (#6)
- Naou Hara – electric bass (#10)
- Tōru Hidaka – arrangement, electric guitar, synthesizer (#10)
- Masato Honda – alto sax (#6)
- Masakazu Ichise – drums (#10)
- Tsutomu Ikeshiro – trombone (#6)
- Osamu Imagome – trombone (#1)
- Rie Inoue – clarinet (#1)
- Shinobu Kawai – electric bass (#1)
- Noriyasu Kawamura – drums (#9)
- Jin'ya Kimura – tuba (#1)
- Chieko Kinbara – violin (#6)
- Takefumi Kobayashi – conga, djembe, metal percussion (#1)
- Takeshi Kobayashi – arrangement, keyboards (#8)
- Tatsuo Kondo – synthesizer (#1)
- Kazuma Koshikawa – electric guitar (#10)
- Kenichi Maeyamada – arrangement, instruments, programming (#3)
- Yoichi Murata – arrangement, trombone (#6)
- Yukio Nagoshi – guitars (#8)
- Nobuhiko Nakayama – arrangement, programming (#7)
- Kōji Nishimura – trumpet (#6)
- Tatsuo Ogura – violin (#6)
- Akira Okumura – trumpet (#6)
- Shunsuke Ōguchi – accordion (#1)
- Shinichi Osawa – arrangement, mixing (#5)
- Otomo Yoshihide – arrangement, guitars (#1)
- Kang Saito – piccolo (#1)
- Masanori Sasaji – piano (#6)
- Hidenori Satō – trumpet (#1)
- Yoshiaki Sato – arrangement, accordion (#11)
- Ringo Sheena – electric guitar (#7), vocals
- Kanade Shishiuchi – trombone (#6)
- Satoshi Shōji – oboe (#6)
- Masahiko Sugasaka – trumpet (#6)
- Hiroshi Suzuki – tenor sax (#1)
- Kenji Takamizu – wood bass (#6)
- Hideyo Takakuwa – flute (#6)
- Negishi Takamune – arrangement, electric bass (#9)
- Mayu Takashima – viola (#6)
- Hisashi Takayanagi – electric guitar (#5)
- Masakuni Takeno – tenor sax (#6)
- Kojiro Takizawa – violin (#6)
- Tom Tamada – arrangement, keyboards (#8)
- Keiichi Tomita – arrangement, instruments, treatments (#4)
- Shinsuke Torizuka – trombone (#6)
- Shinichi Ubukata – electric guitar (#9)
- Takeshi Ueda – arrangement, track composing (#2)
- Nanae Uehara – marimba, timpani (#1)
- Yuji Yamada – viola (#6)
- Hideo Yamaki – drums (#6)
- Takuo Yamamoto – baritone sax (#6)
- Kimio Yamane – clarinet (#6)
- Haruko Yano – violin (#6)
- Hitoshi Yokoyama – trumpet (#6)
- Osamu Yoshida – tenor sax (#6)
- Yasuhiro Yoshigaki – drums (#1)

Technical and production

- Ren Adachi – guitar recording (#8)
- Ryōta Gomi – assistant engineer (Prime Sound Studio Form)
- Uni Inoue – electric guitar recording (#7), recording engineer, mixing engineer, vocal recording (#2, #7)
- Shin'ya Kondō – assistant engineer (Prime Sound Studio Form)
- Kei Kusama – recording engineer, mixing engineer (#2)
- Tadashi Matsumura – recording engineer (#7)
- Shigeo Miyamoto – mastering engineer
- Fumio Miyata – musician coordination (#1, #6)
- Hajime Nagai – recording engineer (#7)
- Atsushi Oota – assistant engineer (Prime Sound Studio)
- Tsuguhiro Sasaki – musician coordination (#1)
- Yūji Tanaka – assistant engineer (Prime Sound Studio Form)
- Masayuki Tsuruta – assistant engineer (Bunkamura Studio)
- Takeshi Ueda – recording engineer, mixing engineer (#2)
- Kazunori Yamada – assistant engineer (Sound Inn)
- Yujiro Yonetsu – assistant engineer (Prime Sound Studio Form)

== Charts ==
Chart (2014)	Peak position
Japan Oricon daily albums	2
Japan Oricon weekly albums	3
Japan Oricon monthly albums	10
Taiwan G-Music East Asian weekly chart	6

=== Sales ===
Chart	Amount
Oricon physical sales	45,000

== Release history ==
Region	Date	Format	Distributing Label	Catalogue codes
Japan	May 27, 2014	CD, digital download	EMI Records Japan	TYCT-60035, TYCT-69017
South Korea	May 28, 2014	Digital download	Universal	
Taiwan	May 30, 2014	CD	Universal	0643945
Hong Kong	June 4, 2014	CD	Universal	0643945
Japan	June 14, 2014	Rental CD	EMI Records Japan	TYCT-60035, TYCT-69017

== See also ==
- Ringo Sheena production discography
