= Private (Ryōko Hirosue song) =

Song by Ryōko Hirosue

Song by Ryōko Hirosue

from the album Private
- Released: 1998
- Recorded: 1998
- Genre: Pop
- Length: 3:53
- Label: Warner Music Japan
- Songwriter: Ringo Sheena
- Producer: Yūta Saitō

"Private" (プライベイト, Puraibeito) is a song by Japanese entertainer Ryōko Hirosue, written by Ringo Sheena. It was released as the B-side to her fourth single "Jeans" on October 7, 1998, and was the title track of her second studio album Private (1999). Hirosue performed it on her first live tour in February 1999. The Budokan performance on February 7, 1999 was released as a CD/DVD set called Hirosue Ryoko First Live: RH Debut Tour 1999 on May 26, 1999. "Private" was also featured on both of Hirosue's greatest hits albums: RH Singles &... (1999) and Hirosue Ryoko Perfect Collection (2002).

== Background and development ==
Hirosue released her debut album Arigato! in 1997, after releasing the singles "Maji de Koi Suru 5-byō Mae", "Daisuki" and "Kaze no Prism", all of which were certified platinum by the RIAJ. She followed up this with the single "Summer Sunset", and released the single "Jeans" in 1998. "Jeans" was used as an ending theme song for the anime Kindaichi Case Files, and "Private" was featured as the single's B-side.

Ringo Sheena released her debut single "Kōfukuron" on May 27, 1998, and her second "Kabukichō no Joō" on September 9, 1998. Sheena came to fame in 1999, after her single "Koko de Kiss Shite." and album Muzai Moratorium, the later of which sold over 1,200,000 copies. During her early career, Sheena wrote "Private" for Hirosue, and several recordings for fellow actress and singer Rie Tomosaka, such as "Cappuccino" (1999) and "Shōjo Robot" (2000).

== Writing and production ==
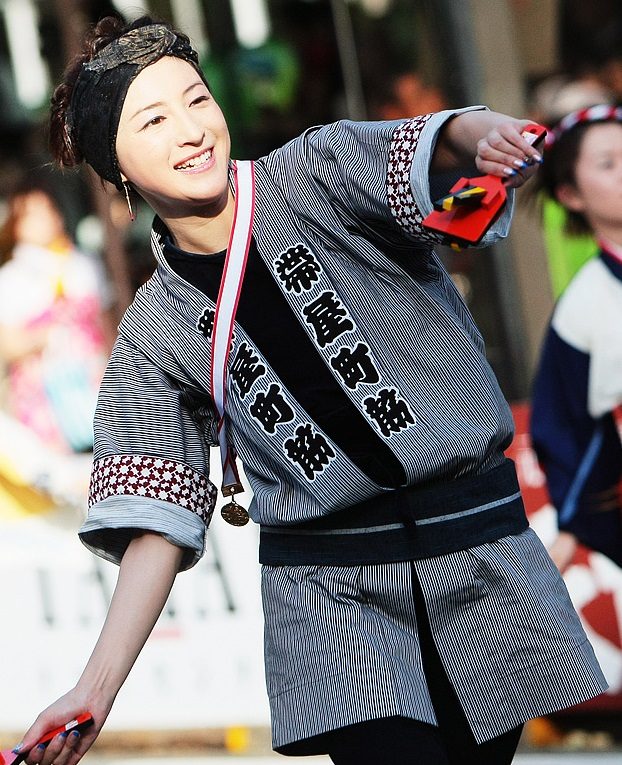
Ringo Sheena wrote lyrics that she believed Ryōko Hirosue (pictured) would say herself.

The song was written by Ringo Sheena, featuring production by Yūta Saitō. The song was recorded as a demo by Sheena before her debut with entirely different lyrics, and was her first song she had given to another musician. The new lyrics were tailored for Hirosue, with Sheena attempting to use words that sounded as if they had come from Hirosue herself for the lyrics. The lyrics, despite their tone, use non-standard, historical kanji versions of words such as kore (是, 此れ), soba (傍), tada (只), iu (云う) and sono (其の).

== Promotion ==
The song was used as the ending theme song for the NTV variety show Ojamanbō in 1998. "Private" was succeeded by "Cappuccino" by Rie Tomosaka in January 1999, a song also written by Sheena.

== Ringo Sheena version ==
"Private"

Promotional single by Ringo Sheena

from the album Gyakuyunyū: Kōwankyoku
- Released: May 14, 2014
- Recorded: 2013
- Genre: Pop
- Length: 3:19
- Label: EMI Records Japan
- Songwriter: Ringo Sheena
- Producer: Kenichi Maeyamada

In 2014, writer Ringo Sheena released her own version of the song for her album of self-covers, Gyakuyunyū: Kōwankyoku.

=== Background and development ===
Sheena performed the song at her Jisaku Jien Nama Jitsuenkai and Kōkotsu Gokuhi Ensōkai concerts in June 1999, but it was not a staple of her set-list.

To re-record the song, Sheena enlisted producer Kenichi Maeyamada, also known as Hyadain, as she saw him as someone developing a new sound in Japanese music. The pair had never met before, but Maeyamada felt he had been inspired by Sheena's single "Stem" and album Kalk Samen Kuri no Hana, especially due to their multimedia aspects and how they interacted with the short film Hyakuiro Megane.

After Maeyamada listened to Hirosue's original version, then had a single meeting with Sheena about the song. Sheena had requested Maeyamada to "make it sparkle", as she felt uncomfortable singing the girly lyrics now that she was in her 30s. Maeyamada took the subway in Tokyo as inspiration for the song, due to the song's lyric man'in no chikatetsu ni noru (満員の地下鉄に乗る; "riding on a fully packed subway"). Maeyamada thought was peculiar and humanising for Hirosue to sing this, as at the time she was at the height of her fame, and probably did not ride on subways. Maeyamada had the concept of a "strange amusement park" in mind, so raised the key and the tempo, and added "cheap-sounding" synths. He further added bowling and cuckoo clock sound effects to the song. The pair then mixed the song together at a later date.

On May 14, "Private" was released on iTunes, when Gyakuyunyū: Kōwankyoku was made available to pre-order, along with the songs "Seishun no Matataki" and "Amagasa". The song received enough airplay to chart at number 68 on the Billboard Adult Contemporary Airplay the week before the album's release.

=== Charts ===
Chart (2014)	Peak position
Japan Billboard Adult Contemporary Airplay	68

=== Release history ===
Region	Date	Format	Distributing Label
Japan	May 14, 2014	Digital download	EMI Records Japan
