= Tokyo Friends =

- Tokyo Friends DVD cover
- Genre: Romantic comedy
- Created by: Max Matsuura
- Written by: Rin Eto
- Directed by: Kozo Nagayama
- Starring: Ai Otsuka; Eita; Rio Matsumoto; Masanobu Katsumura; Yōko Maki; Mao Kobayashi; Ryuta Sato
- Theme music composer: Ai Otsuka & Ikoman; Takehiko Takeuchi
- Opening theme: Friends (フレンズ) by Ai Otsuka
- Ending theme: To Me by Boo Bee Benz; Kimi to Iu Hana (君という花) by Boo Bee Benz; Yumekui (ユメクイ) by Ai Otsuka
- Composer: Sin
- Country of origin: Japan
- Original language: Japanese
- No. of episodes: 5

Production
- Executive producers: Ryuhei Chiba; Masaomi Takagi
- Producers: Motohiro Abe; Yoshikazu Kenmochi; Nanami Takahashi; Hidefumi Tokairin; Ichiro Takai
- Cinematography: Tomotaka Sato; Hiroshi Gonda
- Editors: Yoshifumi Fukasawa; Masaharu Hirakawa
- Camera setup: Multiple-camera setup
- Running time: 46 min. (approx)
- Production companies: Avex Entertainment; Fuji Television

Original release
- Release: June 3, 2005

Related
- Tokyo Friends: The Movie

Tokyo Friends (東京フレンズ, Tōkyō Furenzu) is a Japanese television drama released on June 3, 2005. Unlike many other dramas, it was never aired on television but released as a set of 3 DVDs. Volumes one and two contain the first 4 episodes while volume three contains the last episode. Each episode is approximately 70 minutes.

The Tokyo Friends Premium Box was also released which includes all 5 episodes, a bonus DVD, and 12 postcards. Although this is a very typical Tokyo-story and was never aired, it was quite successful probably because it was Ai Otsuka's debut as an actress.

== Plot ==
Rei Iwatsuki moved from her hometown Kōchi to Tokyo to pursue her dreams. On arrival, she found a job as a waitress in a restaurant and met guitarist Ryuuji Shintani. Ryuuji liked her voice and invited her to join his band as the vocalist, The Survival Company (also known as Sabakan). The two started a relationship but then broke off when Rei wanted to write her own songs.

Rei met other girls also working in the restaurant, Hirono, Ryoko and Maki, all in pursuit of their own dreams, and became good friends with all of them.

== Cast ==
- Ai Otsuka - Rei Iwatsuki
- Eita - Ryuuji Shintani
- Rio Matsumoto - Hirono Hayama
- Masanobu Katsumura - Kazuo Sasakawa
- Yōko Maki - Ryoko Fujiki
- Mao Kobayashi - Maki Abiko
- Ryuta Sato - Kenichi Satomi
- Yuuta Hiraoka - Hidetoshi Tanaka
- Kuranosuke Sasaki - Kohashi
- Mari Hoshino - Akemi
- Kei Tanaka - Wataru Iwatsuki
- Kazuki Kitamura - Keitaro Sasakawa
- Hajime Okayama
- Kazuyuki Asano
- Yutaka Matsushige - Shirakawa
- Shunta Nakamura - Mitsuo Nagase
- Takashi Ito - Oku-chan
- Yuu Misaki - Yoshie Sasakawa
- Arata Furuta - Wada

== Movie ==
Tokyo Friends: The Movie was released in theaters by Shochiku on August 12, 2006 and on DVD by Avex on December 13, 2006.
