= Summer Time Machine Blues =

- Directed by: Katsuyuki Motohiro
- Written by: Makoto Ueda
- Produced by: Chikahiro Ando; Masaki Koide
- Starring: Eita; Juri Ueno; Yoshiaki Yoza; Daijiro Kawaoka; Munenori Nagano; Yoko Maki; Tsuyoshi Muro; Riki Honda; Kuranosuke Sasaki
- Cinematography: Kazunari Kawagoe
- Distributed by: Toshiba Entertainment
- Release date: September 3, 2005
- Running time: 107 minutes
- Country: Japan
- Language: Japanese

Summer Time Machine Blues (サマー タイム マシン ブルース, Samâ Taimu Mashin Burūsu) is a 2005 Japanese film directed by Katsuyuki Motohiro and written by Makoto Ueda, based on Ueda's 2001 play of the same name. The film stars Eita as a member of a university science-fiction club, and Juri Ueno and Yoko Maki as part of the neighboring photography club.

== Plot ==
At a university in Kagawa Prefecture, the science-fiction club and the photography club share a clubroom. On August 19, 2005, the sci-fi club members play a game of baseball while Yui Ito, a member of the photography club takes pictures of them nearby. After the game, the sci-fi club heads off to the bathhouse leaving Yui and fellow photography club member Haruka to develop their pictures. While they bathe, Niimi gets angry because he thinks someone stole his Vidal Sassoon shampoo. On their way back, Komoto sneaks off to buy tickets at the theater for a sci-fi B movie, hoping that he can ask Haruka out. However, Haruka declines his offer as she believes that he already has a girlfriend, even though Komoto has no idea what she is talking about. When Komoto returns to the clubhouse, his friends act very strangely as to where he has been and force him to dance naked. Through a series of chain events, Nimi accidentally spills Coca-Cola all over the air-conditioner remote control, breaking it. Because the air conditioner cannot be operated without the remote, the boys give it to their club advisor, Kotaro Hozumi, referred to as "Hoze," to try and fix.

The next day, Haruka and Yui are developing the photos they took the previous day when Haruka notices a mysterious figure hiding in the clubroom in one photo. Meanwhile, the sci-fi club members discover a strange boy in the clubroom who hurriedly escapes, leaving behind what appears to be a time machine. Believing it to be a practical joke, the members put Soga on the machine, but to their surprise it actually works. Soga travels back to August 19 and ends up watching the baseball match, revealing himself to be the figure the photography club noticed. As a result, Ishimatsu, Koizumi and Niimi decide to travel back to yesterday to steal the remote control before it was broken and bring it back to the present. However, once the boys arrive in the past, they forget their original goal and decide to go exploring.

Back in the present, the strange boy introduces himself as Tamura, a member of the sci-fi club who travelled from August 20, 2030. Much like Soga, he was coerced onto the machine by his fellow club members and does not know where it came from. The remaining members, Haruka, Soga, Yui, and Komoto proceed to take him on a tour of the past. While on the tour they encounter Hoze, who explains that changing the past results in the grandfather paradox and would cause the universe to vanish. Realizing this, the remaining club members rush back to ensure that Ishimatsu, Niimi, and Koizumi do not change the past. Ishimatsu and Koizumi get sent back to the present, but quickly return with Tamura after being informed about the situation. After finding the time machine waiting for them in the club room, Soga and Komoto go travel back to August 19. Upon their arrival, Soga wraps the remote in tape, but ends up travelling to August 19, 1906 to prevent the caretaker from discovering the time machine. As the school was originally a swamp, Soga loses the remote and almost drowns before returning to the present. The past villagers mistake him for a Kappa and Kappas becomes integral to the town culture.

Komoto finds Niimi at the bathhouse and in a twist it is revealed that Niimi himself took the shampoo. With the remote missing, Tamura travels to December 19, 2030 to retrieve the remote from the future so that the past won't be altered. Everyone boards the time machine to return to August 20, 2005, but the machine cannot fit all of them and Komoto gets ejected. Stuck in the past, Komoto then encounters the past club members, who mistakenly believe that he has a girlfriend due to a voice message Komoto sent to the "present Soga" which "past Soga" received. Komoto distracts the club members but before he can leave, his past self enters the clubroom, forcing him to hide in a locker. Meanwhile, the present club members return and notice that Komoto is not with them, only for Komoto to reveal that he was there the whole time, having spent the whole day in the locker. A dog digs up the remote that Soga dropped, which is revealed to still work after having been buried for 99 years. With the air conditioning fixed, Tamura returns to 2030, only to return, as he forgot his camera. He says that the camera once belonged to his mother, and Komoto and Yui note that Haruka has a similar camera. As Tamura had previously stated that his mother also attended this college, Komoto and Yui deduce that Tamura is Haruka's future son.

Professor Hozumi is inspired by these events to build a time machine, which might explain where the machine came from.

Since Komoto's girlfriend was revealed to be a lie, Haruka agrees to go on a date with Komoto. Meanwhile, Komoto wonders how he can change his name (presumably to Tamura).

== Cast ==
- Eita as Takuma Komoto
- Juri Ueno as Haruka Shibata
- Yoshiaki Yoza as Yu Niimi
- Daijiro Kawaoka as Shunsuke Koizumi
- Tsuyoshi Muro as Daigo Ishimatsu
- Munenori Nagano as Jun Soga
- Chikara Honda as Akira Tamura
- Takeshi Masu
- Yōko Maki as Yui Itō
- Kuranosuke Sasaki as Kotaro Hozumi/"Hoze"

== See also ==
- The Tatami Galaxy
