= Sherlock: Untold Stories =

Japanese TV drama (2019)

- シャーロック アントールドストーリーズ
- Genre: Mystery drama Japanese drama
- Based on: Sherlock Holmes by Sir Arthur Conan Doyle
- Written by: Yumiko Inoue 東山狭 (Note: The Roman spelling of this name is unknown.) 上田恒
- Directed by: Hiroshi Nishitani; Yusuke Noda; Kozo Nagayama; Hiroyuki Abe
- Starring: Dean Fujioka; Takanori Iwata; Maho Yamada; Yutaro; Kuranosuke Sasaki
- Theme music composer: Dean Fujioka
- Opening theme: "Searching For The Ghost"
- Ending theme: "Shelly"
- Composer: Yugo Kanno
- Country of origin: Japan
- Original language: Japanese
- No. of episodes: 11 + 1 special

Production
- Producer: Dai Ota
- Running time: 54 minutes
- Production company: Fuji Television

Original release
- Network: Fuji Television
- Release: October 7 – December 16, 2019

Related
- Medical Examiner Asagao; Zettai Reido: Mizen Hanzai Sennyū Sōsa

Sherlock: Untold Stories (シャーロック アントールドストーリーズ, Shārokku: Antōrudo Sutōrīzu) is a Japanese television drama aired on every Monday at 21:00 (JST) on Fuji Television from October 7 to December 16, 2019. This is Dean Fujioka's first lead role in the Fuji TV 21:00 drama time slot.

The opening and ending themes are performed by Dean Fujioka.

A special episode aired on December 23, 2019, the week after the last episode. A film version was released in 2022, titled The Hound of the Baskervilles: Sherlock the Movie.

== Premise ==
Based on Sherlock Holmes detective stories written by Arthur Conan Doyle, this is a one-shot drama series set in modern Tokyo. The British network BBC also aired the drama Sherlock from 2010 to 2017 in modern London, and the American network CBS also aired the drama Elementary from 2012 to 2019 in modern New York City, but this is not a remake of those dramas.

The subtitle "Untold Stories" refers to "incidents in which only the title is slightly mentioned in the text, but the details are not specified." Producer Dai Ota said in an interview, "I thought something was missing in making use of only the relationship between Sherlock and Watson and making the incidents original. Then, the idea came from scriptwriter Yumiko Inoue was 'Untold Stories.'"

Dean Fujioka plays the main character, Shishio Homare, a criminal consultant equivalent to Sherlock Holmes, and his partner, Junichi Wakamiya, a psychiatrist equivalent to John H. Watson, is played by Takanori Iwata.

== Cast and characters ==
- Dean Fujioka as Shishio Homare (His boyhood is played by Ruito Yamashiro (Note: From the flashback in ep. 7. He also plays the role of Torao Hazama.)), a freelance criminal investigation consultant. He has been interested in criminal psychology and human sin since childhood, which led him to solve a number of mysterious crimes as a student. However, he always has a danger lurking inside him and is in danger of becoming a criminal if he makes a mistake. He takes on only those cases that interest him from among the requests the police and individual clients bring. His office and residence suffered a water leak from the upper floor, so he comes to live in Wakamiya's apartment. He was born to a wealthy man, Tatsuo Homare, who had made his fortune from the financial business, and his mother, who became his second wife after having been his mistress. He is a half-brother to his older brother, Makio. (Note: Episode 11. From a conversation between Shishio and Rieko Ichikawa.) When he was 18 years old, Tatsuo died. After Shishio's mother, who was kicked out of the Homare house by Makio who found out that the cause of death of Makio's own mother wasn't an accident, but a suicide, died of a disease, Shishio himself disappeared and moved around abroad without going to college. Five years ago, while in Hong Kong, he assisted in the investigation of the Gloria Scott case, which led him to return to Japan and start his own detective work. The character is based on Sherlock Holmes from the novels and also shares the same initials as S.H.
- Takanori Iwata as Junichi Wakamiya, a psychiatrist at Tomasu Central Hospital. He has been treated as a "good boy" since childhood and has always lived with loneliness and sadness in his heart, so he has a very sensitive personality. When he first met Shishio after an incident, he didn't have a good impression of him, but gradually becomes interested in his charming attitude and builds trust with him as a buddy. He was a classmate of Haruki Akabane at Ebara Medical College, and they obtained a medical license illegally. He later quit his job as a doctor but couldn't pay the rent, so he ended up living with him instead of working as Shishio's assistant. The character is based on John Watson from the novels and also shares the same initials as J.W.
- Kuranosuke Sasaki as Reiji Eto, a unit head in the First Investigation Division of the Tokyo Metropolitan Police Department. His rank is Chief Inspector. He believes himself to be an excellent detective, but he isn't a competent detective as he consciously interferes with investigations and has a habit of slacking off. Therefore, while Shishio makes a fool of him all the time, he leads Shishio to start investigating the case by sweet-talking him. He uses Shishio for his promotion, but he worries about and trusts him to a certain extent. At the end of episode 10, he gets his promotion to a manager of the First Investigation Division in the next human resources. However, in the special episode, it is revealed that he hasn't been promoted any further. The character is based on Inspector Lestrade from the novels.
- Maho Yamada as Kumiko Kogure, a sergeant in the First Investigation Division of the Tokyo Metropolitan Police Department. She is a calm and collected person. Although she considers her boss, Eto, to be excellent, she calmly does her job to solve the case while poking fun at his stray thoughts. She also has an emotional side and sometimes sympathizes with the victims. She doesn't seem to think very well of Shishio and sometimes tells him off. Shishio and others call her Gure. At the end of episode 10, she gets her promotion to the head of the Third Unit in the next human resources. The character is based on Inspector Gregson from the novels.
- Yutaro as Leo, an informant with many mysteries. Since Shishio picked him up, he has followed the people who are considered suspects and provided him with useful information. It is unclear how he came to know Shishio. He mainly uses a skateboard to get around. He has an androgynous face and is very particular about his clothes. In episode 6, he receives a canary from Shishio, and there's also a scene where he appears with it. The character is based on Baker Street Irregulars from the novels.

== Guests ==
=== Episode 1 ===
- Akiyoshi Nakao as Haruki Akabane, a gastroenterologist at Tomasu Central Hospital and Wakamiya's colleague. He had obtained a medical license illegally and was threatened by Gunji about it. So he killed Gunji in a form that Teiko spurred him on. Later, fearing that the fraudulent acquisition of his medical license and the murder of Gunji would come to light, he was mentally forced into a corner and jumped to his death.
- Marika Matsumoto as Teiko Akabane, Haruki's wife. When Haruki was threatened by Gunji for obtaining a medical license illegally, she spurred him on to kill Gunji. She also schemed to set a trap against Shishio and Wakamiya.
- Rena Matsui as Mari Mizuno, a nurse at Tomasu Central Hospital. The first person to discover Haruki's body.
- Yasushi Fuchikami as Takao Gunji, a medical journalist. He holds the important key to the case of Haruki's death by a fall. Like Haruki and Wakamiya, he also tried to obtain a medical license illegally but failed the national examination. Afterward, he threatened Haruki that he would expose the fact that he had obtained a medical license illegally, but Haruki killed him and dumped his body in the sea.
- Houka Kinoshita as Futoshi Ishii, a security guard at Tomasu Central Hospital.
- Sei Hiraizumi as Shigeki Imai, the president of Ebara Medical College. He was the professor in charge of Haruki and Wakamiya when they were in medical college and knows their past.
- Meikyo Yamada as Takashi Akabane, Haruki's father. He is a former professor at the Faculty of Medicine of Keiyo University and on good terms with the Superintendent-General of the Tokyo Metropolitan Police Department, Kanazaki.
- Yoko Asaji as Masae Akabane, Haruki's mother. She has a cold attitude toward Teiko.
- Asaki Nishitomi as Hikari Akabane, Haruki and Teiko's daughter. She has been strictly disciplined to correct her dominant hand by Teiko.

=== Episode 2 ===
- Miho Kanno as Aiko Aoki, a lawyer at Darlington Law Firm. She creates an intelligent and calm atmosphere, and her policy is to stay close to her clients for the rest of their lives, even after their defense is over. On the other hand, she has a secret past she wants to keep sealed, and she sometimes shows her impulsive and emotional side unexpectedly. The character is based on Irene Adler from the novels.
- Yukino Kishii as Misa Kawamoto, a part-time clerk at Darlington Law Firm. She is on friendly terms with Yamashita.
- Toko Miura as Sawako Yamashita, Aoki's former client. She has a brother (Note: That role is played by Shuntaro Yanagi.) who has been sentenced to death for murder. At some point, she began to live under the false name of Hiromi Takahashi.
- Haruka Uchimura as Mamoru Sasaki, a former boyfriend of Takahashi who was killed by a train at Shinjuku Station. He is a homeroom teacher at an elementary school.
- Miku as Hiromi Takahashi, Aoki's client. She was being sued for consolation money by the wife of a man that she had an affair with, and Aoki was negotiating with her.

=== Episode 3 ===
- Ayumi Ito as Rieko Ichikawa, a detective in the Second Investigation Division of the Tokyo Metropolitan Police Department. She graduated from Teito University. (Note: Episode 11. From a web-based information site that Wakamiya was watching.) She was in charge of a jimenshi scam (Note: A jimenshi scam is a type of scam in which a person pretends to be an owner of lands, offers to sell it, and cheats the buyer out of a large amount of money. Reference: ja:地面師) case that occurred five years ago, but she was actually involved with Tanba in the case. Yoshino found out about it, so she killed him.
- Yoshinori Okada as Kazuhito Furuta, an employee in the real estate department of Prenter House Inc., a real estate company. Five years ago, when he worked at Daitei Construction Co., a property he was in charge of at the time was used for a jimenshi scam, and he caused a loss of 2.1 billion yen to his company.
- Naomasa Musaka as Masao Yoshino, a former deep sea fishing crew member. He was a member of a jimenshi scam group and was arrested for a jimenshi scam five years ago. He had just been released from prison but was murdered at the Bando residence.
- Izumi Yamaguchi as Honami Hosokawa, a former housekeeper at the home of Bando who was the president of Daitei Construction Co.
- Momiji Yamamura as Junko Saito, the wife of a wealthy person living in a property in Shibuya that Furuta is in charge of, and a former hairdresser. In fact, she is an impersonator, a member of a jimenshi scam group, and her real name is Hisae Negishi.
- Yukihiro Ino as Kohei Saito, the oldest son of a wealthy person living in a property in Shibuya that Furuta is in charge of. In fact, he is an impersonator, a member of a jimenshi scam group, and his real name is Goro Matsushita.
- Kinya Kikuchi as Tanba, the president of Tanba Club, a real estate brokerage firm. When he worked at Daitei Construction Co., he was a senior colleague of Furuta. He brokered the property that was used for a jimenshi scam five years ago and Saito's property to Furuta.
- Kisuke Iida as Tanaka, a detective in the Second Investigation Division of the Tokyo Metropolitan Police Department and Ichikawa's boss.
- Michio (Note: He is a member of a Japanese comedy duo called Tom Brown.) as a security guard. The first person to discover Yoshino's body at Bando's residence.
- Hiroki Nunokawa as a security guard. The first person to discover Yoshino's body at Bando's residence.

=== Episode 4 ===
- Nobuaki Kaneko as Takuya Ishibashi, the president of Ishibashi Hongo Sports Gym, a boxing gym. After retiring, he puts emphasis on training the younger generation as a trainer.
- Wataru Mori as Kaburagi, a trainer of Ishibashi Hongo Sports Gym.
- Masato Yano as Yuta Kajiyama, a professional boxer of Ishibashi Hongo Sports Gym. He had won two weight classes and was preparing for his first defense as a lightweight champion. But he suddenly disappeared on the day of the fight.
- Fujiko Kojima as Yuko Hosoya, a juku teacher. She was a former English teacher at Tomisaka High School and Kajiyama's former homeroom teacher. She got a serious cervical spine injury in the accident caused by Murakawa's destruction of playground equipment in a park and died after a long hospitalization.
- Kika Kobayashi as Jun Hosoya, a junior high school student of Ishibashi Hongo Sports Gym and Yuko's son.
- Mayumi Asaka as Ikue Hosoya, Yuko's mother. She took in her grandson Jun after Yuko's death.
- Koshiro as Masaki Murakawa, a man found dead after falling at Otokozaka. There were many bruises on his body as if he had been beaten. When he was in college, he cut the rope of athletic playground equipment in Sento Park just for fun, injuring a user, and received a suspended prison sentence on charges of inflicting bodily harm and property damage.
- Hiroki Ando as the role of himself. He reports Kajiyama's world title match live.
- Daijiro Enami as the role of himself (Fuji TV's announcer). He reports on Kajiyama's world title match from his waiting room.

=== Episode 5 ===
- Mayumi Wakamura as Chisako Inui, Takayuki's mother. She was a nurse at the operating room of St. Margate Hospital and left a job because of marriage.
- Mantaro Koichi as Takahisa Inui, Takayuki's father. He was supposed to be out at his mistress's house, but because Chisako was indifferent to anything other than Takayuki, he rented a room outside and spent some time alone.
- Shono Hayama as Takayuki Inui, an employee in the design department of Matsukado Construction Co. Since he was entrusted with the competition for Toyosu Stadium, he had been power harassed by Machida and forced into a corner. And the night of the day he loses the competition and is abused by Machida, he goes missing.
- Masaru Nagai as Takuo Machida, a chief staff in the sales department of Matsukado Construction Co. and the second son of Yosuke Machida, a member of the House of Representatives and a former Minister of Land, Infrastructure, Transport and Tourism. He has power harassed Takayuki and Shimizu. He is called by someone who uses the audio data of his power harassment as a reason and is beaten with a baseball bat.
- Ryota Ozawa as Hiroto Shimizu, an employee in the design department of Matsukado Construction Co. He had been power harassed by Machida, but after Machida's target changed to Takayuki, he was also complicit in the power harassment.
- Yumi Wakatsuki as Masumi, Machida's girlfriend. She visits Machida's room and finds the room in a horrible state with a lot of blood and deadly weapons.

=== Episode 6 ===
- Masato Wada as Soji Ui (His high school days are played by Jiei Wakabayashi), an associate professor of the department of neuropsychiatry at Totan Medical University Hospital. After Hirata's retirement, he took over all researches and patients. He is currently in charge of Ayaka's treatment.
- Ai Yoshikawa as Ayaka Takato, a female high school student. On her way home from juku, she was almost attacked by a man, which triggered her PTSD and caused her to suffer from insomnia, for which she is receiving treatment. One day, she confesses that she committed a murder 20 years ago.
- Reika Kirishima as Miki Takato (Her high school days are played by Riko Nagase), Ayaka's mother. Her maiden name is Kawahara. She is a ceramist and runs an interior design store in Tokyo specializing in ceramics. She is angry because she thinks Shishio visited her to punish Ayaka.
- Satoshi Nikaido as Kazuya Takato, Ayaka's father, and an executive of Woodman Pharmaceutical. In contrast to his wife, who becomes agitated, he treats Shishio with a calm attitude.
- Yozaburo Ito as Hatsuo Hirata, a former professor belonging to department of neuropsychiatry at Totan Medical University Hospital. He was known as an authority on PTSD treatments. But he retired three months ago because his heart disease got worse, and he had to stay home to recuperate.
- Yuho as Junko Tajima. She was an English teacher at a high school in Tokyo. She has been missing for 20 years, and her family has filed a missing person report, but some of her white bones and old clothes are found.
- Mayu Hotta as the woman on a videotape. In the video of counseling records left by Hirata, she confesses, "I was ordered by that person (Jinzo Moriya) to kill a person." The date of the record, December 13, 1999, and the initials of the patient's name, S.A, are written on the record, which is later revealed to be Setsuko Aran.

=== Episode 7 ===
- Ruito Yamashiro as Torao Hazama, Torajiro's grandchild. He asks Shishio to search for Torajiro because he disappeared. He has great admiration for Shishio, and even though he is a child, he is able to infer like an adult.
- Masatō Ibu as Torajiro Hazama (His youth is played by Hiroki Ohchi), Torao's grandfather. He suffers from dementia and goes to daycare at a nursing facility but disappears suddenly. He used to be the "Suma-Tora no Onezumi," a righteous bandit who was active in the 1950s with Suma. But he left the backroom business after stealing from the office of Yamamori-Gumi, a yakuza organization, in September 1959.
- Kondo Yoko as Michie Hazama, Torao's mother.
- Toshiya Toyama as Yuhei Terashima, a director at Senior House Edogawa no Mori, a nursing facility.
- Asuka Kurosawa as Kanako Nagamine, a caregiver at Senior House Edogawa no Mori, a nursing facility.
- Yuki Arisawa as Maki Kasai, a caregiver at Senior House Edogawa no Mori, a nursing facility.
- Yukijiro Hotaru as Ginji Suma (His youth is played by Tatsuhiko Machida). He used to be the "Suma-Tora no Onezumi," a righteous bandit who was active in the 1950s with Torajiro. However, he lost his right thumb protecting Torajiro when he stole from the office of Yamamori-Gumi, a yakuza organization, and he left the backroom business.

=== Episode 8 ===
- Kyoko Hasegawa as Setsuko Aran, a principal of Sutton Business School. She is always greedy to get what she wants.
- Mitsuki Tanimura as Aya Kitayama, Aran's secretary. She graduated from Sutton Business School one year ago and can't stop respecting Aran.
- Yuki Kubota as Masaki Shibata, an employee in the Ministry of Economy, Trade and Industry. He and Misaki are found dead in his apartment.
- Daichi Saeki as Yuichi Misaki, an employee at a tailor shop in Nagata-cho. He and Shibata are found dead.
- Katsunori Takahashi as Makio Homare, Shishio's half-brother and a bureaucrat of the Ministry of Economy, Trade and Industry. (Note: Episode 11. From the conversation between Eto and Kogure as they track down Shishio and Wakamiya.) He has an adversarial relationship with Shishio and is a nervous and sharp person. He always looks down on Shishio and makes a fool of him, but he recognizes his intelligence and loves him as his own flesh and blood. When he was 25 years old, his father, Tatsuo, died. At that time, he found out that the cause of death of his mother, who he thought had died in an accident at a young age, was suicide due to pessimism caused by the mistress relationship between Tatsuo and Shishio's own mother. So he kicked her out of the Homare house. The character is based on Mycroft Holmes from the novels and also shares the same initials as M.H.

=== Episode 9 ===
- Kohei Otomo as Tomoji Koga, a chef-owner of Ristorante Elena, a northern Italian restaurant. He claimed to have invented the signature dish that made his restaurant famous, the quail cacciatore, even though it was invented and cooked by Arai. Due to mild cerebral infarction, he had spoken inarticulately, and his sense of taste had become dull. But he couldn't say it to maintain his restaurant.
- Tomohiro Kaku as Shingo Arai, a deputy chef of Ristorante Elena. Tired of being Koga's ghost chef, he agrees to be headhunted by another restaurant. Just before the opening of the restaurant on the day of the incident, he submits his resignation to Koga but is found dead in the cleaning supplies closet.
- Kazuya Tanabe as Shigeru Kato, a sommelier of Ristorante Elena. He has a history of killing a person in a fight when he was young, and when he couldn't find a job, Koga hired him. He keeps the sommelier knife that Koga gave him.
- Yuki Ito as Keisuke Nishioka, a pastaio of Ristorante Elena. He had racked up debts from Arai. Taking advantage of this, Arai, who plans to remind Koga that he is no longer useful as a chef, threatens Nishioka. Then, Arai tries to make him take out Koga's recipe book, but Kato stops him.
- Robin Furuya as Toma Saeki, a patissier of Ristorante Elena. Due to Arai's absence, he was also forced to assist in the preparation of other dishes that were not desserts, and he gives up on the future of the restaurant and wants to go home early.
- Kaori Shima as Rinko Fuwa, a customer of Ristorante Elena and Tatsuhiko's wife. She came to the restaurant with Tatsuhiko to celebrate their wedding anniversary.
- Toshiki Ayata as Tatsuhiko Fuwa, a customer of Ristorante Elena and Rinko's husband. He runs a construction company and takes charge of the building of Ristorante Elena. He came to the restaurant with Rinko to celebrate their wedding anniversary.
- Rie Minemura as Seiko Nakahara, a customer of Ristorante Elena and an investor. She was going to meet with him to discuss headhunting Arai as a business partner.
- Ryoko Yui as Mizue Takatsu, a customer of Ristorante Elena and an editor of the magazine "Stoke." She comes to the restaurant with Oishi for an interview but complains that the quail cacciatore isn't served.
- Takeshi Masu as Mansaku Oishi, a customer of Ristorante Elena and a food critic. He comes to the restaurant with Takatsu for an interview but complains about the taste of the food.
- Koji (Note: At the time this drama aired, he was a member of a Japanese comedy duo called Brillian.) as Kinoshita, a detective in the precinct.

=== Episode 10 ===
- Gitan Otsuru as Shohei Ukai, the Governor of Tokyo. He has the Tokyo gubernatorial election coming up in three months, but his approval rating is declining after a weekly magazine reported his alleged affair with a woman. He resigns as the Governor of Tokyo after the kidnapping of Ryosuke. (Note: As of episode 11, his title is the former governor of Tokyo.)
- Seishu Uragami as Ryosuke Ukai, Shohei's son and a 3rd year member of St. Luke's High School Basketball Club. His grades are excellent. He uses his low height to his advantage as a point guard. He is also the captain of the team and has a promising future. Someone kidnaps him and demands a ransom of 100 million yen.
- Shuichiro Masuda as Satoshi Haida, a coach of St. Luke's High School Basketball Club. He gives his players excessive coaching and is especially hard on Ryosuke.
- Shota Matsushima as Yohei Tsuzaki, Shohei's government-paid second secretary.
- Yu Sakuma as Takeuchi, a 3rd year member of St. Luke's High School Basketball Club. He and Ryosuke share a dormitory room.
- Takashi Okabe as Tadokoro, Shohei's government-paid first secretary.

=== Episode 11 ===
- Rino Katase as Sonomi Hado, a superintendent of Baker Heights where Shishio and Wakamiya live together. She meets Shishio when she visits Wakamiya's room to urge him to pay his outstanding rent. From then on, she makes a complaint to them whenever she gets a chance. The character is based on Mrs. Hudson from the novels.
- Eisuke Sasai as Yamashita, the Vice-Superintendent-General of the Tokyo Metropolitan Police Department. He gives Eto a mission.
- Masaki Miura as Teppei Tsukioka, a prison officer. A guard at Tokyo Detention House where a mass escape occurred. After Ichikawa and the others escaped, he went missing. However, he was wounded in the leg by a warning shot from a police officer of the Iriya police station who was on patrol and was hospitalized at Tomasu Central Hospital. When Wakamiya, who had infiltrated the hospital, asked him about the whereabouts of Ichikawa and the others, he replied, "I want you to wait a day," but then killed himself with a utility knife.
- Kento Shibuya as Mashu Tanaka, one of the defendants who escaped from Tokyo Detention House with Ichikawa. He is a former lawyer who graduated from the Faculty of Law at Meiho University but was arrested as the main suspect in an "It's me" scam. (Note: An "It's me" scam is a type of scam in which a person calls an elderly person, posing as a relative who is in need of money, and tricks them into paying a large amount of money by appealing to their emotions. It was so named because when calling them, the first thing to say is, "It's me." Reference: ja:特殊詐欺) He has been once abused by his father and has a scar on the back of his hand where his father pressed a cigarette flame on. Right after Shishio and Wakamiya visited an office, he is stabbed to death by a man nearby.
- Rie Kitahara as Hitomi Kasuga, one of the defendants who escaped from Tokyo Detention House with Ichikawa. She graduated from Tokyo Chuo University and is a former instructor at a specialized training college. She delivered flowers planted with explosives to Shohei's office, injuring the clerk.
- Shima Onishi as Jinzo Moriya, one of the defendants who escaped from Tokyo Detention House with Ichikawa. His background is unknown. He is the leader of a criminal syndicate and Shishio's old enemy. He waited for Shishio in Alicia's boathouse and said, "I'm Moriya." But after saying, "Do you think I'm the real Moriya?" he grabbed Shishio's hand and jumped into the sea with him and disappeared. The character is based on Professor James Moriarty from the novels and also shares the same initials as J.M.

=== Special Episode ===
The people involved and perpetrators of the previous 11 episodes also appear in the special episode.

- Haruka Kinami as Karen Moji, a freelance journalist. She follows up on the aftermath of criminals who were exposed for their crimes by Shishio and those who were saved by him.

Perpetrators

Teiko Akabane (ep. 1)
Takuya Ishibashi (ep. 4)
Chisako Inui (ep. 5)
Soji Ui (ep. 6)
Kanako Nagamine (ep. 7)
Shigeru Kato (ep. 9)
Rieko Ichikawa (ep. 11)

The people involved

Misa Kawamoto (ep. 2)
Jun Hosoya (ep. 4)
Yuta Kajiyama (ep. 4)
Takahisa Inui (ep. 5)
Ayaka Takato (ep. 6)
Torao Hazama (ep. 7)
Tomoji Koga (ep. 9)

People in the flashback

Haruki Akabane (ep. 1)
Aiko Aoki (ep. 2)
Masaki Murakawa (ep. 4)
Takuo Machida (ep. 5)
Miki Takato (ep. 6)
Shingo Arai (ep. 9)
Rinko Fuwa (ep. 9)
Tatsuhiko Fuwa (ep. 9)

== Episodes and ratings ==
No.	Title	Directed by	Written by	Untold case(s)	Original release date	Rating (Kantō)
1	"世界一有名なミステリーが蘇る! 天才探偵と精神科医が運命の出会い! 医師変死の謎を解け"; Transliteration: "Sekaiichi Yūmei na Misuterī ga Yomigaeru! Tensai Tantei to Seishinkai ga Unmei no Deai! Ishi Henshi no Nazo wo Toke"	Hiroshi Nishitani	Yumiko Inoue	The Dreadful Business of the Abernetty Family	7 October 2019	12.8
2	"新宿駅替え玉遺体の女の謎! 都会の闇に埋もれた女達"; Transliteration: "Shinjuku Eki Kaedama Itai no Onna no Nazo! Tokai no Yami ni Umoreta Onnatachi"	Yusuke Noda	Yumiko Inoue	The Case of the Darlington Substitution Scandal	14 October 2019	9.3
3	"地面師詐欺という闇! 死者の伝言は3本の小枝…"; Transliteration: "Jimenshi Sagi to Iu Yami! Shisha no Dengon wa Sanbon no Koeda…"	Kozo Nagayama	Yumiko Inoue	The Tankerville Club Scandal	21 October 2019	9.9
4	"ボクシング世界王者の失踪…空白の15分に何が?"; Transliteration: "Bokushingu Sekai Ouja no Shissou… Kūhaku no Jūgohun ni Nani ga?"	Yusuke Noda	Yumiko Inoue	The Disappearance of Mr. James Phillimore	28 October 2019	10.6
5	"死体が歩く夜…真相は、愛か狂気か"; Transliteration: "Shitai ga Aruku Yoru… Shinsou wa, Ai ka Kyōki ka"	Kozo Nagayama	Yumiko Inoue	The Case of the Woman at Margate with no Powder on her Nose	4 November 2019	9.3
6	"前世殺人? 古いビデオテープが語る真相"; Transliteration: "Zense Satsujin? Furui Bideo Tēpu ga Kataru Shinsou"	Yusuke Noda	Yumiko Inoue	The Arrest of Wilson, the Notorious Canary-Trainer	11 November 2019	8.3
7	"少年シャーロック現る! 祖父誘拐と開かずの金庫"; Transliteration: "Shōnen Shārokku Arawaru! Sofu Yūkai to Akazu no Kinko"	Hiroshi Nishitani	東山狭 (script cooperator: Yumiko Inoue)	The Case of Matilda Briggs and the Giant Rat of Sumatra	18 November 2019	9.9
8	"遺書の暗号は殺しの招待状"; Transliteration: "Isho no Angou wa Koroshi no Shōtaijō"	Kozo Nagayama	上田恒 (script cooperator: Yumiko Inoue)	The Story of the Red Leech and the Death of Crosby the Banker	25 November 2019	8.9
9	"最終章へ…別れの予感! 最後の晩餐は密室殺人レストラン"; Transliteration: "Saishūshō e… Wakare no Yokan! Saigo no Bansan wa Misshitsu Satsujin Resutoran"	Yusuke Noda	Yumiko Inoue	The Case of Mrs Farintosh and the Opal Tiara	2 December 2019	9.9
10	"最終章 都知事長男誘拐事件! そして彼が覚醒する"; Transliteration: "Saishūshō Tochiji Chōnan Yūkai Jiken! Soshite Kare ga Kakusei Suru"	Hiroyuki Abe	東山狭 (script cooperator: Yumiko Inoue)	The Case of the Politician, the Lighthouse, and the Trained Cormorant	9 December 2019	8.8
11	"最終回! 最強バディが下す決断…愛するものを守れるか? この冬最も胸を熱くするラスト"; Transliteration: "Saishūkai! Saikyō Badī ga Kudasu Ketsudan… Ai Suru Mono wo Mamoreru ka? Kono Fuyu Mottomo Mune wo Atsuku Suru Rasuto"	Yusuke Noda	Yumiko Inoue	The Case of the Cutter Alicia	16 December 2019	9.8
SP	"探偵×医師の最強バディ再び 終わらぬ最期の事件!"; Transliteration: "Tantei × Ishi no Saikyō Badī Futatabi Owaranu Saigo no Jiken!"	Hiroshi Nishitani	東山狭 and Shuho Takase (script cooperator: Yumiko Inoue)	The Case of the Unfortunate Mme. Montpensier The Bogus Laundry Affair	23 December 2019	7.7; Average Rating (Kantō): 9.9

== Related products ==
=== Soundtrack ===
It was released by Pony Canyon on November 27, 2019. All tracks are composed by Yugo Kanno.

Track	Title
1	Sherlock MAIN THEME
2	Zaiaku (罪悪)
3	"Tensai" (天才)
4	Shuppatsuten (出発点)
5	Bonyou na Ningen (凡庸な人間)
6	Tanjun na Suiri (単純な推理)
7	Shinri (心理)
8	Jiyū Kimama (自由気まま)
9	Kansatsu (観察)
10	Like a dream
11	Yowai Ningen (弱い人間)
12	Hametsu (破滅)
13	Bunsekiteki na Suiri (分析的な推理)
14	Bikou (尾行)
15	Kiki (危機)
16	Daiji na Mono (大事なもの)
17	Trick
18	Sherlock~Piano Ver.~
19	Kiken na Tantei (危険な探偵)
20	What's up fellows?
21	Get me now!
22	Utsukushī Mono (美しいもの)
23	Unmei no Itazura (運命の悪戯)
24	Sherlock~Ballad Ver.~
25	Sherlock~Violin Ver.~
26	Daiji na Mono~Violin Ver.~ (大事なもの)

=== Blu-ray and DVD ===
They were released by Pony Canyon on May 8, 2020. The number of discs is 4 for Blu-ray and 7 for DVD.

Bonus footage

- Scenes from the poster and teaser shoot
- A Birthday Surprise for Dean Fujioka
- Press conference
- Collection of the opening of the main story
- Collection of actors' finish shooting scenes
- Official SNS video collection
  - Collection of pre-air announcements
  - Live streaming videos on official SNS
  - Dancing to the song "Shelly": unreleased making-of video
  - Dancing to the song "Rat-tat-tat": unreleased making-of video ~practicing a dance~
- Collection of candid shots and making-of videos (It includes unreleased footage from official SNS.)
- Collection of trailers
  - Teaser trailer
  - Collection of public relations

Enclosed bonus

- Photo book (36 pages)

== International broadcast ==
Sherlock: Untold Stories premiered on October 8, 2019, on KKTV, a video streaming service in Taiwan. It also started airing on March 5, 2020, on Videoland Japan Channel (緯來日本台) in Taiwan under the title 世界第一名偵探·夏洛克.
