= Mao Kobayashi (actress) =

Japanese newscaster and actress

- 小林 麻央
- Mao Kobayashi on her wedding day in 2010
- Born: Mao Kobayashi; 21 July 1982; Ojiya, Niigata, Japan
- Died: 22 June 2017 (aged 34); Aobadai, Meguro, Tokyo, Japan
- Other name: Mao Horikoshi
- Occupations: Actress, newscaster
- Years active: 2003–2017
- Spouse: Ichikawa Ebizō XI (m. 2010)
- Children: 2
- Relatives: Maya Kobayashi (sister)

Mao Kobayashi (小林 麻央, Kobayashi Mao; 21 July 1982 – 22 June 2017) was a Japanese freelance newscaster and actress. She was also one of Fuji TV's weathercasters.

== Early life and education ==
Kobayashi was born in 1982 in Ojiya, Niigata, the younger of two children. Her family moved between Saitama, Saitama and Nishinomiya, Hyogo seven times before settling in Arakawa, Tokyo when she was in high school. Her sister is Maya Kobayashi (b. 1979).

Kobayashi attended Kokugakuin Senior High School. In 2005, she graduated from the department of psychology at Sophia University.

== Career ==
While still in university, she gained attention for starring in Nippon TV's talk program Koi no kara Sawagi.

From October 2003 to September 2006, Kobayashi served as the weather caster for Fuji TV's Mezamashi Saturday. She was appointed as the navigator for a corner on Fuji TV's Junk Sports in April 2004. In October 2006, Kobayashi became a presenter for the News Zero program on the Nippon Television Network.

In June 2004, Kobayashi made her acting debut as a flight attendant in the Fuji TV television drama Division 1: Pink Hip Girl.

Kobayashi retired to focus on raising a family.

== Personal life ==
During an interview for News Zero, she met kabuki actor Ichikawa Ebizō XI. On 19 November 2009, they announced that they were dating with the intent of marriage and were to be formally engaged sometime in December 2009. The couple registered their marriage on 3 March 2010 and held their wedding reception at The Prince Park Tower on 29 July 2010.

She gave birth to their first child, daughter Reika, on 25 July 2011. On 22 March 2013, she gave birth to their second child, son Kangen.

=== Illness and death ===
Kobayashi was diagnosed with breast cancer in October 2014 but kept her illness a secret. On 9 June 2016, her husband announced her condition at a press conference after the tabloid, Sports Hochi, ran a front-page scoop about her ordeal. The cancer had reached stage four and spread to her bones and lungs. In November 2016, the BBC announced that she was one of the BBC's '100 Women 2016' — a list of inspirational and influential women for 2016 — after she started a blog about her illness and how she was dealing with it. Titled 'Kokoro', it became one of the most popular blogs in Japan.

Kobayashi died of cancer on 22 June 2017.

== Filmography ==
=== Film ===
- Tokyo Friends: The Movie (2006)
- Captain (2007)
- A Tale of Mari and Three Puppies (2007)

=== Television ===
- Division 1: Pink Hip Girl (Fuji TV, 2004) – Emi Saeki
- Tokyo Friends (Fuji TV, 2005) – Maki Abiko
- Slow Dance (2005) – Ayumi Hirose
- Unfair (Fuji TV, 2006) – Rieko Matsumoto
- Happy! (TBS, 2006) – Choko Ryugasaki
- Oishii Propose (TBS, 2006) – Saori Shimazaki
- Taiyou no Uta (TBS, 2006) – Yuuko Miura
- Happy! 2 (TBS, 2006) – Choko Ryugasaki
