= Maya Kobayashi =

Japanese journalist (born 1979)

Maya Kunimitsu
- 國光 麻耶
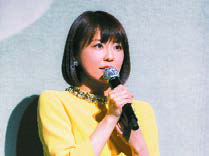
- Born: Maya Kobayashi (小林 麻耶); July 12, 1979 (age 47); Tokyo, Japan
- Occupation: Journalist
- Years active: 2003 - present
- Spouse: Akira Kunimitsu (m. 2018)
- Relatives: Mao Kobayashi (sister)

Maya Kobayashi (小林 麻耶, Kobayashi Maya; born July 12, 1979, in Tokyo, Japan) is a Japanese journalist.

== Biography ==
Kobayashi was born in Tokyo on July 12, 1979. She graduated from Aoyama Gakuin University. After working for TBS as a presenter, she become a freelance presenter in 2009, but continued to work on TBS programs. She was formerly affiliated with Cent Force and Ikushima Planning. Currently she was freelance.
