= Tokyo Friends: The Movie =

- Japanese: 東京フレンズ The Movie
- Directed by: Kozo Nagayama
- Written by: Rin Eto
- Starring: Ai Otsuka; Rio Matsumoto; Yōko Maki; Mao Kobayashi; Eita
- Production company: Tokyo Friends: The Movie Film Partners (Note: Composed of: Avex Entertainment Inc., Shochiku, Dentsu, Famima Digital One Co. Ltd., SKY Perfect Well Think, Gentosha, Kodansha, Yahoo! Japan, IMJ Entertainment, and Eisei Gekijo)
- Distributed by: Shochiku
- Release date: August 12, 2006
- Running time: 1h 56 min.
- Country: Japan
- Language: Japanese

Tokyo Friends: The Movie (東京フレンズ The Movie) is a 2006 Japanese film directed by Kozo Nagayama. The film is an extension to the original drama series Tokyo Friends with the same cast and plot. The film was noted for being Ai Otsuka's debut in theatre.

== Plot ==
At the end of the TV series, Rei began to gain fame as a rising vocalist for The Survival Company. Ryuuji's band though was involved in triad activities and was disbanded. Ryuuji moved to New York City to restart his life. Upon discovering that Ryuuji is in New York, Rei flew to New York to meet him just before an important concert that could make her a real star in Japan.

== Cast ==
- Ai Otsuka as Rei Iwatsuki
- Rio Matsumoto as Hirono Hayama
- Yōko Maki as Ryōko Fujiki
- Mao Kobayashi as Maki Abiko
- Eita as Ryūji Shintani
- Yuta Hiraoka as Hidetoshi Tanaka
- Shunta Nakamura as Mitsuo Nagase
- Takashi Ito as Oku-chan
- Ryuta Sato as Kenichi Satomi
- Kuranosuke Sasaki as Kohashi
- Arata Furuta as Wada
- Kazuki Kitamura as Keitaro Sasakawa
- Masanobu Katsumura as Kazuo Sasakawa
