= The Tatami Galaxy =

2004 novel & 2010 anime

- 2008 edition and DVD cover art

四畳半神話大系 (Yojōhan Shinwa Taikei)
- Genre: Dark comedy; Psychological drama; Romantic comedy
- Novel
- Written by: Tomihiko Morimi
- Published by: Ohta Publishing; Kadokawa Shoten
- English publisher: HarperCollins
- Published: December 2004; March 25, 2008 (bunkoban)
- Anime television series
- Directed by: Masaaki Yuasa
- Produced by: Fumie Takeuchi; Noriko Ozaki
- Written by: Makoto Ueda; Masaaki Yuasa
- Music by: Michiru Ōshima
- Studio: Madhouse
- Licensed by: AUS: Siren Visual; NA: Funimation; UK: Anime Limited
- Original network: Fuji TV (Noitamina)
- Original run: April 22, 2010 – July 1, 2010
- Episodes: 11
- Novel

The Tatami Time Machine Blues
- Written by: Tomihiko Morimi; Makoto Ueda
- Published by: Kadokawa Shoten
- English publisher: HarperCollins
- Published: July 29, 2020
- Original net animation

The Tatami Time Machine Blues
- Directed by: Shingo Natsume
- Produced by: Fumie Takeuchi; Noriko Ozaki; Eunyoung Choi; Hana Sugawara
- Written by: Makoto Ueda
- Music by: Michiru Ōshima
- Studio: Science Saru
- Licensed by: Disney Platform Distribution
- Released: September 14, 2022 – October 12, 2022
- Episodes: 6
- Anime film

The Tatami Time Machine Blues
- Directed by: Shingo Natsume
- Produced by: Fumie Takeuchi; Noriko Ozaki; Eunyoung Choi; Hana Sugawara
- Written by: Makoto Ueda
- Music by: Michiru Ōshima
- Studio: Science Saru
- Released: September 30, 2022

The Tatami Galaxy (Japanese: 四畳半神話大系, Hepburn: Yojōhan Shinwa Taikei; lit. "4½ Tatami Mythological Chronicles") is a 2004 Japanese varsity novel written by Tomihiko Morimi and published by Ohta Publishing. Its first-person narrator is an unnamed upperclassman at Kyoto University reminiscing on the misadventures of his previous years of campus life, with each of the four chapters taking place in parallel universes in which he is enrolled in a different student society.

A sequel, The Tatami Time Machine Blues (四畳半タイムマシンブルース, Yojōhan Taimu Mashin Burūsu), was published in 2020, which combines the characters of The Tatami Galaxy with the plot of Makoto Ueda's play and film Summer Time Machine Blues. English translations of both novels were published by HarperCollins in December 2022 and November 2023, respectively.

The Tatami Galaxy was adapted into an 11-episode anime television series produced by Madhouse and directed by Masaaki Yuasa, which aired on Fuji TV's late-night Noitamina programming block in 2010. The adaptation was critically acclaimed, winning the 2010 Japan Media Arts Festival Grand Prize in the Animation Division and the 2011 Tokyo Anime Award in the Television Category. An original net animation adaptation of The Tatami Time Machine Blues produced by Science Saru premiered in September 2022 on Hulu in the United States and Disney+ internationally.

== Plot ==
The Tatami Galaxy follows an unnamed third-year student at Kyoto University, using parallel universes as a plot device to explore how his life would have differed had he joined a particular student society (called a "circle" in Japan). The original novel follows four different timelines. The first has him joining the Film Ablutions Club where he works under the tyrannical rule of upperclassman Jōgasaki, the second timeline has him answer a "Disciples Wanted" notice where he is joined by fellow classman Ozu and Akashi to perform tasks for the eccentric Seitarō Higuchi, the third timeline has him joining the Mellow Softball Club, a cult-like group that he ultimately leaves, before he is thrown into a conflict involving Ozu and Jōgasaki's pristine love doll Kaori, and the fourth timeline has him join the underground Lucky Cat Chinese Food group, which he ultimately leaves due to their cruel methods.

In each timeline, the protagonist constantly runs into the devious Ozu who, despite his malicious and diabolical mind, considers him his closest friend. He also meets Akashi, a girl who is a year younger than him whom he slowly develops a close romantic kinship with, thanks to a mochiguman keychain she lost. Other characters he frequently meets, in differing situations thanks to the parallel universe theme, are the eccentric master Seitarō Higuchi, the jock-like film club leader Masaki Jōgasaki, and the lively alcoholic dental hygienist Ryōko Hanuki. Within each further timeline, the protagonist is convinced that life would be much different if he had chosen another club, mainly to avoid people like Ozu, only for this to be disproven with each timeline. His closeness to Akashi also changes from that of mutual respect, to that of genuine love.

He encounters a fortune teller who tells him that he is to pursue some kind of chance that he must take, adding that even if he was to pass it up, it will still come to him at some point. The prediction is "Colosseo", with the protagonist finding something in each timeline that seems to have a loose connection to it. This culminates in the last timeline: the protagonist decides that he no longer wants to attend any meetings or meet anyone, and finds himself in an endless universe of four-and-a-half mat tatami rooms (the titular Tatami Galaxy). He traverses the endless Tatami Galaxy for eighty days (from his perspective), during which he discovers that each tatami room is actually an alternate timeline. Coming to the conclusion that he misses his friends and that no matter what he did, he was never going to achieve a "rose-colored campus life", he finally escapes the Tatami Galaxy.

Each timeline ends with the protagonist, and a few of the associated characters, chasing Ozu onto a bridge above the Kamo River Delta, following him pulling one too many devious actions. A swarm of moths fly in (during which the final timeline reveals had come from the Tatami Galaxy) and coats the entire area. It always ends with Akashi running in terror from the moths (her biggest phobia) and Ozu falling into the Delta and breaking his leg. The protagonist comforts and later asks Akashi out (telling the reader that he doesn't want to "bore" them about his new relationship with her), and meets with Ozu in the hospital where he makes amends with him. The first three chapters end with a malicious Ozu telling the protagonist that he likes to show his "love" to him with his weird habits, while the final chapter has the newly appreciative protagonist turn the tables on Ozu's "affection".

== Characters ==
Protagonist / "Me" (私, Watashi)
Voiced by: Shintarō Asanuma
An unnamed college student in Kyoto reflecting on his past two years of college life. He entered college with dreams of finding a "rose-colored campus life" and the love of a "raven-haired maiden," but is continually disillusioned when he is unable to achieve this ideal. He is shy, self-regarding, and easily manipulated by others.
Ozu (小津)
Voiced by: Hiroyuki Yoshino
A troublemaking student who claims he is bound to the protagonist by the black thread of fate, and who often encourages the protagonist to make morally questionable choices. His mischievous nature is personified in his pale and unsettling appearance, resembling a yōkai.
Akashi (明石)
Voiced by: Maaya Sakamoto
An engineering student who is commonly (but not always) the center of the protagonist's affections, and who often appears in the same club that the protagonist joins. She has a cold and rational personality, but shows hints of softness and helpfulness towards the protagonist. She suffers from a severe fear of moths.
Seitarō Higuchi (樋口 清太郎, Higuchi Seitarō)
Voiced by: Keiji Fujiwara (The Tatami Galaxy), Kazuya Nakai (Tatami Time Machine Blues)
Though he claims be a god of matchmaking in the first episode, Higuchi—also referred to as "Master Higuchi", or simply "the Master" (Shishō)—is an eighth-year super senior living in the same dorm as the protagonist. He has a wise, distant, and nonchalant personality, and is always seen wearing a yukata. Higuchi, Hanuki, the ramen stall owner, and Jōgasaki were formerly classmates; Higuchi has an ongoing rivalry with the lattermost, called the "proxy-proxy war".
Masaki Jōgasaki (城ヶ崎 マサキ, Jōgasaki Masaki)
Voiced by: Junichi Suwabe
An eighth-year super senior and president of the movie circle. Though handsome and popular, he is privately lecherous and owns a love doll named Kaori. He often takes an antagonistic role relative to the protagonist, and is often assisted by Ozu in a way that is detrimental to the protagonist's progress, in spite of the fact that Ozu is helping the protagonist at the same time. Has an ongoing rivalry with Higuchi.
Ryōko Hanuki (羽貫 涼子, Hanuki Ryōko)
Voiced by: Yuko Kaida
A dental hygienist and former classmate of Higuchi and Jōgasaki. A frequent drinker, she drastically loses her sense of judgement when inebriated; aware of this, she is cautious about choosing who she goes drinking with.
Kaori (香織)
Voiced by: Mamiko Noto, Nobuyuki Hiyama
A love doll owned by Jōgasaki.
Aijima (相島)
Voiced by: Setsuji Satō
A subordinate in the film circle who secretly leads the Secret Society Lucky Cat Chinese Restaurant.
Keiko Higuchi (樋口 景子, Higuchi Keiko)
A person the protagonist believes to be an elegant girl with whom he exchanges letters. She is actually Akashi, who writes the letters to the protagonist as a prank at Ozu's behest.
Fortune teller (老婆, Rōba)
Voiced by: Ako Mayama
An old woman who appears in every episode, almost always along Kiyamachi Street, and tells the protagonist (often but not always at his behest) to seize the opportunities before him (or a variation thereof). She increases the price for her services by ¥1000 in each subsequent episode.
Cat Ramen stall owner (猫ラーメン店主, Neko Rāmen tenshu)
Voiced by: Atsushi Miyauchi
The owner of the ramen shop the protagonist favors. He is mostly silent, occasionally putting in a short, new insight into the protagonist's current conversations or problems. He occasionally takes on a more active role in the protagonist's adventures, always a helpful one.
Johnny (ジョニー, Jonī)
Voiced by: Nobuyuki Hiyama
A cowboy representing the protagonist's libido, who constantly bickers with the protagonist.
Tamura (田村)
Voiced by: Chikara Honda
A character from The Tatami Time Machine Blues. He is a college freshman from 25 years in the future who helped build a time machine and tested it out. He is later revealed to be the future child of Akashi and, most likely, the protagonist.

== Media ==
=== Novel ===
The Tatami Galaxy was first published in Japanese in December 2004 as a tankōbon by Ohta Publishing; it was republished in March 2008 as a bunkoban by Kadokawa Shoten. The novel was published in Korean by Viche in August 2008, in traditional Chinese by China Times Publishing in December 2009, and in simplified Chinese by Shanghai People's Publishing House in August 2010.

Morimi's 2006 novel The Night Is Short, Walk On Girl serves as a spiritual successor to Tatami Galaxy, with a shared setting and some recurring characters. The novel was published in English in the United States in 2019 by Yen Press.

The Tatami Galaxy received a sequel, titled The Tatami Time Machine Blues (四畳半タイムマシンブルース, Yojōhan Taimu Mashin Burūsu; lit. "4½ Tatami Time Machine Blues"), inspired by Makoto Ueda's stage play and film Summer Time Machine Blues. It was published in Japan on July 29, 2020.

Both The Tatami Galaxy and The Tatami Time Machine Blues were published in the United States by HarperCollins in December 2022 and November 2023, respectively, translated by Emily Balistrieri.

=== Anime ===
An anime television series adaptation of The Tatami Galaxy was produced by Madhouse, with Masaaki Yuasa as director, series composition by Makoto Ueda, teleplays by Ueda and Yuasa, and music by Michiru Ōshima. The series premiered on April 22, 2010, as a part of Fuji TV's Noitamina programming block. Two theme songs are used for the series: "Maigoinu to Ame no Beat" by Asian Kung-Fu Generation as the opening theme, and "Kamisama no Iutōri (神様のいうとおり; lit. "As God Dictates") by Etsuko Yakushimaru as the closing theme.

Three seven-minute animated shorts were included with the Japanese DVD and Blu-ray releases of the series. The first DVD/BD volume was released on August 20, 2010, and contained the first short; the second and third shorts were released on the third and fourth DVD/BD volumes on October 22, 2010, and November 26, 2010, respectively.

In North America, the series was simulcast by Funimation, and it was first licensed in United Kingdom by Beez Entertainment. In June 2019, Funimation announced the release of the series on Blu-ray and DVD with subtitles only on September 3.

On August 12, 2021, it was announced that The Tatami Time Machine Blues novel would be receiving an anime adaptation. The series, later revealed to be an original net animation (ONA), is produced by Science Saru, directed by Shingo Natsume and written for television by Makoto Ueda, with character designs by Yusuke Nakamura, music composed by Michiru Ōshima, and the majority of the original Japanese voice cast reprising their roles. Asian Kung-Fu Generation performed the theme song "Demachiyanagi Parallel Universe". The 6-episode series premiered exclusively on Disney+ in Japan on September 14, 2022, while a theatrical compilation film version followed on September 30. The Disney+ release of the series includes an original episode that was not covered by the theatrical compilation, which was released on October 12, 2022, along with the series finale. The series was also released in the United States on November 9, 2022. It was slated to appear on Disney+, but was unexpectedly moved over to Hulu with no promotion or announcement.

==== Episode list ====
No.	Title	Storyboard artist	Directed by	Original release date
1	"Tennis Circle "Cupid"" "Tenisu Sākuru "Kyūpiddo"" (テニスサークル「キューピッド」)	Masaaki Yuasa	Masaaki Yuasa	April 22, 2010
At a ramen stall behind Shimogamo Shrine, the protagonist meets a man who claims he is a god of matchmaking and that Akashi will be bound to either the protagonist or Ozu. The protagonist reflects on joining the tennis circle as a freshman, only to become embittered upon learning its membership was composed entirely of couples; abetted by Ozu, he spent the next two years sabotaging the relationships of his clubmates. He came to like Akashi, and had promised her to take her to the ramen stall behind the shrine. Higuchi tells the protagonist to confess his feelings to Akashi during Gozan no Okuribi, but he fails to do so.
2	"Film Circle "Misogi"" "Eiga Sākuru "Misogi"" (映画サークル「みそぎ」)	Akitoshi Yokoyama	Akitoshi Yokoyama	April 29, 2010
The protagonist joins the movie circle, but his ideas for films are rejected by Jogasaki, the circle’s president. Encouraged by Ozu, the protagonist spends the next two years shooting a documentary exposing the worst aspects of Jogasaki's character, including his love doll Kaori. He becomes fond of Akashi, the only member of the circle who takes an interest in his films, but she rebuffs him upon seeing the exposé.
3	"Cycling Association "Soleil"" "Saikuringu Dōkōkai "Soreiyu"" (サイクリング同好会「ソレイユ」)	Ryōtarō Makihara	Ryōtarō Makihara	May 6, 2010
The protagonist joins the cycling club, but is too frail to be competitive in races. He spends the next two years saving money to buy a road bike, but it is stolen. Akashi recruits the protagonist to be the pilot of the birdman glider she is building; the protagonist trains under Jogasaki to prepare for the event, but his increased musculature makes him too heavy for the glider. When Ozu attempts to steal the glider, it slips down a grade towards a pond. The protagonist attempts to steer the plane to safety, but instead crashes it.
4	"Disciples Wanted" "Deshi Motomu" (弟子求ム)	Akitoshi Yokoyama	Akitoshi Yokoyama	May 13, 2010
The protagonist and Ozu become disciples of Higuchi, who over the course of two years makes them do a variety of mundane tasks. The protagonist’s final task is to find a mythical tortoise brush that can purportedly clean anything; he is aided by Akashi, also a disciple of Higuchi. Upon finding the brush, Higuchi reveals that he has chosen the protagonist as his successor to carry on a “proxy proxy war” with Jogasaki, the original cause of which has become lost to time. Jogasaki chooses Ozu as his successor, who is revealed to have been a double agent all along.
5	"Softball Circle "Honwaka"" "Sofutobōru Sākuru "Honwaka"" (ソフトボールサークル「ほんわか」)	Hiroshi Hamasaki	Tomoya Takahashi	May 20, 2010
The protagonist joins the softball team, but finds that the outward kindness of its membership mask their hive mind and cult-like tendencies. The team is owned by a health food company, and the protagonist falls for the company owner’s daughter; he spends the next two years buying a large volume of the company’s products, before being invited to visit their factory. The company owner believes that the world will end in 2012 and has built a Noah's Ark, which is subsequently stolen and crashed by Ozu. The protagonist and Ozu flee the factory, and are rescued by the ramen shop owner.
6	"English Conversation Circle "JoEnglish"" "Eikaiwa Sākuru "Joingurisshu"" (英会話サークル「ジョイングリッシュ」)	Shingo Natsume	Shingo Natsume	May 27, 2010
The protagonist joins three circles as a freshman, one of which is the English Conversation Circle. He becomes close to Hanuki, a fellow member of the club, while simultaneously living with Kaori the love doll and exchanging letters with a girl named Keiko. One night, he must choose between getting drinks with Hanuki, spending time with Kaori before returning her to Jogasaki, or meeting Keiko in person. He chooses Hanuki, and after a night of heavy drinking, ends up at her apartment. To the chagrin of Johnny, the personification of the protagonist’s libido, he chooses to not reciprocate Hanuki’s inebriated flirting and returns home.
7	""Hero Show Association" Circle" "Sākuru "Hiro Shō Dōkōkai"" (サークル「ヒーローショー同好会」)	Michio Mihara	Michio Mihara	June 3, 2010
The second of the three clubs joined by the protagonist in the previous episode is the Hero Show Association, where he dresses as a costumed character and performs for children. During one show, the protagonist intervenes when Akashi is harassed by two men. This attracts the attention of Jogasaki, who hires the protagonist to be Kaori’s bodyguard. The protagonist again faces the choice of which of the three women he will spend the night with; he chooses Kaori and attempts to elope with her, but once again is berated by Johnny when he hesitates in consummating his desires. Jogasaki, who has been informed of the protagonist’s actions by Ozu, finds the protagonist, kicks him away, and takes Kaori back.
8	"Reading Circle "SEA"" "Dokusho Sākuru "SEA"" (読書サークル「SEA」)	Hiroshi Shimizu	Junichi Fujise	June 10, 2010
The third of the three clubs joined by the protagonist is the Reading Circle, where Ozu lends him a novel inscribed with the name and address of Keiko, its previous owner. Keiko and the protagonist exchange letters over the subsequent two years, before she invites them to meet. Once again, the protagonist faces a choice between the three women; he goes to Keiko’s apartment, only to find Ozu instead. Akashi appears and explains that she wrote the letters at Ozu’s behest as a prank; though Ozu eventually tired of the prank, she continued to write the letters in earnest as thanks for when the protagonist saved her at the Hero Show. The protagonist returns home, where he is lectured by Johnny for not asking Akashi out.
9	"Secret Society "Lucky Cat Chinese Restaurant"" "Himitsu Kikan "Fukuneko Hanten"" (秘密機関「福猫飯店」)	Akitoshi Yokoyama	Akitoshi Yokoyama	June 17, 2010
As a freshman, the protagonist joins a secret society that organizes the dubious campus activities seen in the previous episodes. While the protagonist fails in the various missions the society assigns him, Ozu is incredibly effective and eventually becomes the leader of the society. Under Ozu, the protagonist rises through the ranks of the society, but still feels dissatisfied with life; Higuchi explains this is because the perfect, idealized campus life he is searching for does not actually exist. In the depths of his depression, the protagonist discovers that Ozu has a girlfriend; he is dismayed to learn that Ozu, who always seemed to be wasting time, has truly enjoyed his college years. The protagonist declares that he should simply stay in his 4½ tatami room; unlike in every episode prior, time does not rewind.
10	"The 4½ Tatami Ideologue" "Yōjōhan Shugisha" (四畳半主義者)	Eunyoung Choi	Eunyoung Choi	June 24, 2010
Disillusioned by the discovery that a perfect life does not exist, the protagonist joins no clubs as a freshman, choosing instead to spend all of his free time in his 4½ tatami room. He awakens one morning to discover that he is surrounded by an infinite number of seemingly identical rooms behind every door, window, and wall. It transpires that the rooms bear slight variations, each corresponding to a parallel universe determined by the choices he could have (and has) made throughout the series. Overwhelmed by loneliness, the protagonist collapses. Once again, time does not rewind.
11	"The End of the 4½ Tatami Age" "Yōjōhanki no Owari" (四畳半紀の終わり)	Masaaki Yuasa	Masaaki Yuasa	July 1, 2010
Still trapped in the tatami world, the protagonist continues to search for an exit to no avail, eventually returning to the room he started from. Upon noticing that Akashi's lost mochiguman hangs from the ceiling in every room, he realizes that he loves Akashi. As he makes this realization, a swarm of moths appear, which knock him back to the night of Gozan no Okuribi depicted in the first episode. Back in reality, he rescues Ozu from the various groups he has wronged throughout the series, and asks Akashi out to the ramen shop after returning her mochiguman. The protagonist moves out of the 4½ tatami room, and begins to date Akashi. The protagonist and Akashi visit Ozu and, in a mirrored version of their conversation from the first episode, the protagonist offers to lend assistance to Ozu.

=== Film ===
The Night Is Short, Walk On Girl, a feature film and spiritual sequel to The Tatami Galaxy, based on the novel of the same name, was released by Toho on April 7, 2017.

== Reception ==
The Tatami Galaxy won the grand prize in the animation category at the 14th Japan Media Arts Festival on December 8, 2010, making it the first television series to win the award, with the jury describing the series in their justification as a "richly expressive work that turns the limitations of TV on its head" and complimenting its "unique scene layouts, characters' actions and color scheme." It also won the Television Category award at the 10th Tokyo Anime Awards in 2011.

In 2019, Polygon staff named The Tatami Galaxy as one of the best anime of the 2010s; writer Julia Lee commented, "This is my all-time favorite anime. It's wordy, it's fun, and it has this great, over exaggerated art style". In a 2019 Forbes's article about the best anime of the 2010s decade, Lauren Orsini considered it to be one of the five best anime of 2010; she wrote, "With thoughtful wordplay and deep insight into the human condition, this Bildungsroman bridges fantasy and reality with a cast of characters just on the other side of absurd".

=== Accolades ===
Year	Award	Category	Recipient	Result	Ref.
2010	14th Japan Media Arts Festival	Grand Prize for Animation Division	The Tatami Galaxy	Won	
2011	10th Tokyo Anime Award	Best Picture for TV Series	The Tatami Galaxy	Won	
2023	58th PEN America Literary Awards	PEN Translation Prize	The Tatami Galaxy	Nominated	
