= The Ravine of Goodbye =

2008 film

- Original Japanese poster
- Directed by: Tatsushi Ōmori
- Screenplay by: Tatsushi Ōmori; Ryo Takada
- Based on: Sayonara keikoku by Shuichi Yoshida
- Produced by: Akira Morishige
- Starring: Yōko Maki; Anne Suzuki; Nao Ōmori as Watanabe; Arata Iura (as Arata); Hirofumi Arai
- Cinematography: Ryo Otsuka
- Edited by: Ryo Hayano
- Music by: Masahiro Hiramoto
- Production companies: Stardust Pictures; Phantom Film; King Records; Studio3
- Release date: 22 June 2013 (Japan)
- Running time: 117 minutes
- Country: Japan
- Language: Japanese

The Ravine of Goodbye (Japanese: さよなら渓谷, Hepburn: Sayonara keikoku) is a 2013 Japanese drama film directed by Tatsushi Ōmori. The film is based on the Japanese 2008 novel Sayonara keikoku by Shuichi Yoshida, which intrigued Ōmori with its central mystery of a rape victim and her perpetrator choosing to live together. It won the Special Jury Prize at the 35th Moscow International Film Festival. The ending theme song "Saisakizaka" was written by musician Ringo Sheena, and performed by lead actress Yōko Maki.

== Cast ==
- Yōko Maki
- Anne Suzuki
- Nao Ōmori as Watanabe
- Arata Iura as Arata
- Hirofumi Arai
- Masaki Miura
- Mayu Tsuruta
- Mansaku Ikeuchi
- Shima Ohnishi
- Hana Kino
- Izumi Minai
