= Kozo Nagayama =

Japanese television and film director (born 1956)

- Born: July 22, 1956 (age 69); Tokyo, Japan
- Occupations: Television and film director

Kozo Nagayama (永山耕三, Nagayama Kozo; born on July 22, 1956, in Tokyo, Japan) is a Japanese television and film director.

== Filmography ==
- Tokyo Love Story (1991, TV series)
- Under One Roof (1993, TV series)
- Platonic Sex (2001) – as producer and director
- Backdancers! (2006)
- Tokyo Friends: The Movie (2006)
- Sherlock: Untold Stories (2019, TV series)
