= Eita Nagayama =

Japanese actor (born 1982)

- 永山 瑛太
- Nagayama in 2026
- Born: Eita Nagayama (永山 瑛太); December 13, 1982 (age 43); Tokyo, Japan
- Occupation: Actor
- Years active: 1999–present
- Spouse: Kaela Kimura (m. 2010)
- Children: 2
- Relatives: Kento Nagayama (younger brother)
- Website: www.eita.jp

Eita Nagayama (永山 瑛太; born December 13, 1982), occasionally credited mononymously as Eita, is a Japanese actor from Tokyo. He has appeared in many Japanese television dramas and movies; most notable is the TV series Water Boys. He also appeared in Summer Time Machine Blues and Tokyo Friends: The Movie.

== Biography ==
In March 2009, Nagayama made his theatrical role debut as human in a romantic relationship with a female ghost. The same year in August, he made his theatrical role in Tokyo Gekko Makyoku, playing the mysterious character living in the early Shōwa era.

On June 1, 2010, after becoming engaged at the end of 2009, Nagayama married singer Kaela Kimura, who was already five months pregnant. The couple announced that they submitted their marriage registration on September 1, 2010. Nagayama and Kimura have two children together.

Nagayama appeared with Jun Matsumoto and Masami Nagasawa in Sei Sankaku Kankei (正三角関係; Trilateral Connection) Hideki Noda. Performances occurred at Tokyo Metropolitan Theatre in Kitakyushu and Osaka as well as Sadler's Wells Theatre in London, the latter under the name of "Love in Action", running from July 11 until November 2, 2024.

== Filmography ==
=== Film ===
Year	Title	Role	Notes	Ref.
2002	Aoi Haru	Obake		
2003	Azumi	Hiei		
2003	9 Souls	Kaneko Noboru		
2005	Summer Time Machine Blues	Komoto Takuma	Lead role	
2005	Densha Otoko	Hirofumi		
2005	Hanging Garden	Tezuka		
2006	Su-ki-da	Yosuke (young)		
2006	Memories of Matsuko	Sho Kawajiri		
2007	Dororo	Tahomaru		
2007	The Foreign Duck, the Native Duck and God in a Coin Locker	Kawasaki	Lead role	
2008	Season of Snow	Shiroyama Gun	Lead role	
2009	April Bride	Taro Akasu	Lead role	
2009	Dear Doctor	Keisuke Soma		
2009	No More Cry!!!	Yusuke Shimoigusa		
2009	Nodame Cantabile: The Final Score - Part I	Ryutaro Mine		
2009	Toad's Oil	Tetsuya Yazawa		
2010	Nodame Cantabile: The Final Score - Part II	Ryutaro Mine		
2011	Hara-Kiri: Death of a Samurai	Chijiiwa Motome		
2014	The Magnificent Nine	Tokuheiji Sugawara		
2016	64: Part I	Akikawa		
2016	64: Part II	Akikawa		
2017	Mixed Doubles	Hisashi Hagiwara	Lead role	
2018	My Friend "A"	Hideto Suzuki	Lead role	
2020	Family Bond	Takashi Kawai		
2021	Hokusai	Ryūtei Tanehiko		
2021	In the Wake	Mikumo		
2023	September 1923	Shinsuke		
2023	Monster	Hori	Lead role	
2023	Undercurrent	Satoru		
2023	Don't Call it Mystery: The Movie	Garo Inudō		
2024	Don't Lose Your Head!	Ōishi Kuranosuke		
2024	Kaze yo Arashi yo	Ōsugi Sakae		
2024	I Ai	Kuga		
2025	Hero's Island	On		
2027	In My Father's Room	Taku		
2028	The Realm Beyond		Lead role	

=== Television ===
Year	Title	Role	Notes	Ref.
2002	The Queen of Lunchtime Cuisine	Noboru Sakai		
2002	Remote	Keisuke Sawamura	Episodes 3 and 4	
2003	Water Boys	Masatoshi Tanaka		
2003	Kimi wa Petto	Junpei Horibe		
2003	The Always the Two of Us	Kohei Morinaga		
2004	Orange Days	Keita Yashima		
2006	Nodame Cantabile	Ryutaro Mine		
2006	Unfair	Kazuyuki Ando		
2006	Suppliment	Satoshi Ogiwara		
2008	Atsuhime	Naogoro/Komatsu Tatewaki	Taiga drama	
2008	Last Friends	Takeru Mizushima		
2009	The Voices	Kaji Daiki	Lead role	
2010	Hard to Say I Love You	Keisuke Nakajima	Lead role	
2011	Still, Life Goes On	Hiroki Fukami	Lead role	
2013	Matrimonial Chaos	Mitsuo Hamasaki	Lead role	
2014	Kuroi Fukuin	Yoshitaka Ichimura		
2014	All About My Siblings	Satoru Satō		
2017	Hello, Detective Hedgehog	Goro Nanase	Lead role	
2018	Segodon	Ōkubo Toshimichi	Taiga drama	
2018	Anone	Riichi Nakaseko		
2020	Ashita no Kazoku	Kōtarō Hyōdō	Television film	
2021	How to Get a Divorce for the Whole Family!	Kōichi Obara		
2021	Bullets, Bones and Blocked Noses	Munate	Miniseries	
2022	Bakumatsu Aibō-den	Sakamoto Ryōma	Television film	
2022	Don't Call it Mystery	Shō Kumada		
2022	Kaze yo Arashi yo	Ōsugi Sakae	Television film	
2023	Even If You Don't Do It	Yōichi Yoshino		

=== Japanese dub ===
Year	Title	Role	Notes	Ref.
2013	Planes	Dusty Crophopper		
2014	Planes: Fire & Rescue	Dusty Crophopper		

== Stage ==
Year	Title	Role	Notes	Ref.
2024	Sei Sankkaku Kankei/Love in Action			

== Awards and nominations ==
Year	Organization	Award	Work	Result	Ref.
2009	33rd Elan d'or Awards	Newcomer Award	Himself	Won	
2009	5th Annual TV Navi Drama Awards	Best Supporting Actor	Last Friends	Won	
2009	17th Hashida Awards	Best Newcomer		Won	
2009	34th Hochi Film Awards	Best Supporting Actor	Dear Doctor	Won	
2010	52nd Blue Ribbon Awards	Best Supporting Actor	Dear Doctor	Won	
2013	6th International Drama Festival in Tokyo	Best Actor	Matrimonial Chaos	Won	
2019	73rd Mainichi Film Awards	Best Supporting Actor	My Friend A	Nominated	
2024	78th Mainichi Film Awards	Best Supporting Actor	September 1923	Nominated	
