= Saisakizaka =

Single by Yōko Maki
- Released: May 27, 2013
- Recorded: 2013
- Genre: Easy listening
- Length: 3:44
- Label: EMI Records Japan
- Songwriter: Ringo Sheena
- Producer: Ringo Sheena

"Saisakizaka" (幸先坂; "Fortune Hill Road") is the debut single by Japanese actress Yōko Maki, released on May 27, 2013. The Ringo Sheena-produced song was used as the theme song to the film The Ravine of Goodbye (2013), Maki's first leading film role since Veronika Decides to Die in 2005.

== Background and development ==
Maki, a fan of Ringo Sheena's, first met her in 2007 or 2008, after which the pair became frequent penpals, and Maki often attending Sheena's concerts. She first worked as a vocalist in 2011, when Maki covered Minoru Obata's 1950 kayōkyoku song "Hoshikage no Komichi" on Tokyo No. 1 Soul Set's album Subete Hikari. Director Tatsushi Ōmori heard the song, and thought Maki's voice would fit well with the atmosphere of the film. Maki hesitated in agreeing to sing the theme song as she did not consider herself a singer. Maki felt she needed somebody to rely on for the project, and asked Sheena if she could help.

== Writing and production ==
Sheena wrote the song after watching the uncompleted film, after receiving the impression of "the smell of midsummer soil" during the ending credits. She felt that she should give the song a very unadulterated feel. When Maki asked for Sheena's input into the project, she thought that Sheena would have written something similar to Tokyo Jihen's "Rakujitsu" (2005). However, after hearing "Saisakizaka," she was surprised at how well it fit with the film. Sheena was present at the recording studio the entire time while Maki was recording the song. Maki felt the song was difficult to sing, and was not used to her voice even when watched the final cut of The Ravine of Goodbye.

== Promotion and release ==
A music video was created to promote the single. It was also directed by the director of the film, Tatsushi Ōmori. A short version of this was uploaded to YouTube on May 15, 2013.

The physical single was released in Japan exclusively at Tower Records on May 27, 2013, in a CD/DVD format. A digital download version was released for purchase at stores such as iTunes and Amazon.co.jp. The single was released on the same day as Sheena's "Irohanihoheto/Kodoku no Akatsuki" single. The release date marks the 15th anniversary of Ringo Sheena, who debuted with the single "Kōfukuron" on May 27, 1998.

The song was performed by Sheena as the final song of her Tōtaikai concerts in November 2013, which was later released to DVD in March 2014. A studio self-cover version appears on her 2014 album Gyakuyunyū: Kōwankyoku.

== Track listing ==
All tracks are written by Ringo Sheena.

No.	Title	Length
1.	"Saisakizaka"	3:44
2.	"Saisakizaka (Shinryokuhen)" (新緑篇, "Spring Green Mix")	3:42
Total length:		7:26

DVD
No.	Title	Length
1.	"Saisakizaka (music video)"	3:44

== Charts ==
Chart (2013)	Peak position
Japan Oricon weekly singles	47

== Sales and certifications ==
Chart	Amount
Oricon physical sales	2,000

== Release history ==
Region	Date	Format	Distributing Label	Catalogue codes
Japan	May 27, 2013	CD/DVD, digital download	EMI Records Japan	QIAG‐70074
