= Shōjo Robot =

Single by Rie Tomosaka

from the album Daisuki!, Rie Tomosaka Best +3
- B-side: "Ikenai Ko," "Nippon ni Umarete"
- Released: June 21, 2000
- Genre: J-pop, J-Rock, Alternative rock
- Length: 2:40
- Label: Toshiba EMI
- Songwriter(s): Ringo Shiina
- Producer(s): Ringo Shiina

Rie Tomosaka singles chronology
"Cappuccino" (1999)	"Shōjo Robot" (2000)	"Tokai no Manners" (2009)

"Shōjo Robot" (少女ロボット; "Girl Robot") is a song by Rie Tomosaka, written by rock musician Ringo Shiina. It was released as her final single before her hiatus, on June 21, 2000. The song was used as an ending theme song for the Nippon Television variety show Fun.

== Rie Tomosaka version ==
=== Background ===
Ringo Shiina had previously worked with Tomosaka on her 1999 album, Murasaki. (むらさき。, Purple.). She had written the lead single, "Cappuccino," the B-side to the single "Mokuren no Cream" (木蓮のクリーム; "Magnolia Cream") and the album track "Shampoo" (シャンプー, Shanpū).

=== Conception ===
Shiina created a temporary 5-piece band to record the single, and named it Ikenai Kotachi (いけない子達, The Bad Kids). Along with Tomosaka on vocals and Shiina on piano/back-up vocals, Hisako Tabuchi of Number Girl/Bloodthirsty Butchers featured as the band's guitarist.

The songs on the single were created in the vein of Shiina's Shōso Strip album (released three months prior). "Shōjo Robot" and "Ikenai Ko" were written with Tomosaka's image in mind, while "Nippon ni Umarete" was an unused demo from the Shōso Strip sessions.

=== Release ===
The song was a hit for Tomosaka, it being her highest charting single since 1997's "Naichaisō yo." It debuted at #12 on the Oricon singles chart, and stayed in the top 20 for two weeks.

The single was released nine months after the release of her greatest hits collection Rie Tomosaka Best, hence was not compiled in it. "Shōjo Robot" features as track #16 of the Taiwan only greatest hits album Daisuki!, which was released simultaneously as this single in Taiwan.

All three songs were later compiled onto the 2009 re-release of Rie Tomosaka Best called Rie Tomosaka Best+3.

=== Music video ===
The music video was shot by director Shūichi Banba (番場秀一). It depicts Tomosaka performing the song in a room with wall partitions lit with different colour themes. her back-up band consists of a pianist, a guitarist and a drummer - all played by Ringo Shiina.

The music video has never been released to DVD, as Tomosaka's music video clip collection Rie Tomosaka Clips was released in October 1999 and she has not released a DVD since.

As of January 4, 2010 the music video for "Shōjo Robot" has been viewed over 182,000 times on popular video-sharing website YouTube.

=== Track listing ===
All songs written and produced by Ringo Shiina.

No.	Title	Length
1.	"Shōjo Robot"	2:40
2.	"Ikenai Ko (いけない子; "Bad Kid")"	4:20
3.	"Nippon ni Umarete (日本に生まれて; "Born in Japan")"	5:12
Total length:		12:12

=== Oricon Album Charts ===
Release	Chart	Peak position	First week sales	Sales total
June 21, 2000	Oricon Weekly Singles Chart	12	28,740	61,710

== Release history ==
Country	Release date
Japan	June 21, 2000
Taiwan	July 1, 2000

== Tokyo Jihen version ==
Originally, Sheena performed live covers of "Shōjo Robot" and "Nippon ni Umarete" at her July 30, 2000 Zazen Xstasy concert, and later "Ikenai Ko" at her Gekkō Kuon Taizu concert on November 25, 2000.

Later, with her band Tokyo Jihen, they covered "Shōjo Robot" live at their "Domestic!" Just Can't Help It. tour (April 7, 2005 - May 30, 2005). The track was released as a digital download on August 30, 2006, a week before the DVD's release. The song, as well as Blackout and Mirror-ball, received a promotional live music video, which was aired on music video channels in promotion of the DVD.

=== Track list ===
No.	Title	Length
1.	"Shōjo Robot from DVD 'Just Can't Help It."	2:54
