= Cappuccino (song) =

Single by Rie Tomosaka

from the album Murasaki.
- B-side: "Mokuren no Cream"
- Released: January 27, 1999
- Recorded: 1999
- Genre: Pop music, Pop-rock
- Length: 3:54
- Label: Toshiba EMI
- Songwriter: Ringo Sheena
- Producer: Seiji Kameda

Rie Tomosaka singles chronology
"Itoshii Toki" (1998)	"Cappuccino" (1999)	"Shōjo Robot" (2000)

"Cappuccino" (カプチーノ, Kapuchīno) is a single by Japanese entertainer Rie Tomosaka, released on January 27, 1999. "Cappuccino" and its B-side "Mokuren no Cream" were both written by musician Ringo Sheena. In 2014, Sheena released a cover of the song on her album Gyakuyunyū: Kōwankyoku, which reached number 98 on the Billboard Adult Alternative Chart.

== Background and development ==
"Cappuccino" was the lead single from her album Murasaki., released one month beforehand. Her previous album, Un, was produced by Yasushi Akimoto. Tomosaka had released two singles in 1998, "Koishiteru" and "Itoshii Toki." "Koishiteru" was produced by Seiji Kameda, who also worked on "Cappuccino."

"Cappuccino" and "Mokuren no Cream" were the second and third songs Ringo Sheena had produced for another musician, after the Ryōko Hirosue song "Private." Sheena worked extensively with Tomosaka, also writing the song "Shampoo" for Murasaki. and Tomosaka's next single "Shōjo Robot" (including its B-sides "Ikenai Ko" and "Nippon ni Umarete"). She worked together with Sheena again in 2009 on her post-hiatus album Toridori., with the songs "Tokai no Manner" and "Kodomo no Jōkei."

Sheena first performed "Cappuccino" live at her Jisaku Jien Nama Jitsuenkai concert on June 14, 1999. In 2014, Sheena released a cover of the song on her album Gyakuyunyū: Kōwankyoku.

== Promotion and release ==
The song was used as an ending theme song for the NTV variety show TV Ojamanbō in 1999, a tie-up that had previously gone to the Ryōko Hirosue song "Private."

A music video was produced to promote the song. It features scenes of Tomosaka swinging on a neon pole in a black room, as well as scenes of her in a white room holding a lily.

== Track listing ==
All tracks are written by Ringo Sheena.

No.	Title	Length
1.	"Cappuccino"	3:54
2.	"Mokuren no Cream" (木蓮のクリーム, "Magnolia Cream")	3:43
3.	"Cappuccino (Original Karaoke)"	3:54
Total length:		13:22

== Charts and sales ==
Chart (1999)	Peak position
Japan Oricon weekly singles	67

=== Sales and certifications ===
Chart	Amount
Oricon physical sales	7,000

== Release history ==
Region	Date	Format	Distributing Label	Catalogue codes
Japan	January 27, 1999	8 cm CD	Toshiba EMI	TODT-5247
Taiwan	April 1, 1999	8 cm CD	EMI Music Taiwan	
