= Yōko Maki (actress) =

Japanese actress (born 1982)

- 真木 よう子
- Born: Yōko Kanamori (金森 陽子); October 15, 1982 (age 43); Inzai, Chiba, Japan
- Occupation: Actress
- Years active: 1999–present
- Agent: LesPros Entertainment
- Spouse: Reio Katayama (m. 2008; div. 2015)
- Children: 1

Yōko Maki (真木 よう子 Maki Yōko, born Yōko Kanamori on October 15, 1982) is a Japanese actress signed to Soyokaze. Maki has appeared in several films including the 2004 film Infection and the 2004 American horror film The Grudge.

== Biography ==
Maki made her film debut at the age of 19 in the 2001 film Drug. Her film career took off when she received the role of Aya in The Princess Blade, a 2001 reimagining of the manga Lady Snowblood. Maki later began performing on stage in the 2002 play Cross.

=== Marriage ===
In November 2008, Maki announced that she had married former actor Reio Katayama, she also announced her pregnancy. On May 10, 2009, she gave birth to their only child, a daughter. They divorced in September 2015.

== Filmography ==
=== Films ===
| Year | Title | Role | Ref. |
|---|---|---|---|
| 2001 | Drug | Miki Kondō | |
| 2001 | The Princess Blade | Aya | |
| 2003 | Battle Royale II: Requiem | Maki Sōda | |
| 2004 | Kamikaze Girls | BTSSB Staff | |
| 2004 | Ren'ai Shōsetsu (恋愛小説) | Mami Suzuki | |
| 2004 | A Perfect Day for Love Letters | Rino Katasé | |
| 2004 | Infection | Yūko Kirino | |
| 2004 | Break Through! | Gang-ja Chun | |
| 2004 | The Grudge | Yoko | |
| 2004 | Do Androids Dream of Electric Santa? (short film) | | |
| 2005 | In the Pool | Yoko Maki | |
| 2005 | Summer Time Machine Blues | Yui Itō | |
| 2005 | Veronika Decides to Die | Towa | |
| 2006 | In the Pool | Yoko Maki | |
| 2006 | The Vanished (雨の町, Ame no Machi) | Fumio Kōsaka | |
| 2006 | Sway | Chieko Kawabata | |
| 2006 | The Fast and the Furious: Tokyo Drift | Major Boswell's Girlfriend | |
| 2006 | Udon | Yui Itō | |
| 2006 | A Delicious Way to Kill (おいしい殺し方, Oishii Koroshikata) | Marii Tōdaiji | |
| 2006 | Tokyo Friends: The Movie | Ryōko Fujiki | |
| 2008 | Flying Rabbits (フライング☆ラビッツ) | Chinatsu Kakiuchi | |
| 2009 | SP | Eri Sasamoto | |
| 2011 | Hard Romantic-er | | |
| 2011 | Looking for a True Fiancee | | |
| 2011 | Genji Monogatari: Sennen no Nazo | Fujitsubo | |
| 2013 | Like Father, Like Son | | |
| 2013 | The Ravine of Goodbye | | |
| 2013 | Sue, Mai & Sawa: Righting the Girl Ship | Maiko Okamura | |
| 2015 | The Lion Standing in the Wind | | |
| 2015 | Nōnai Poison Berry | Ichiko Sakurai | |
| 2016 | After the Storm | Kyoko | |
| 2018 | The Blood of Wolves | Rikako | |
| 2018 | Yakiniku Dragon | Shizuka | |
| 2020 | The Grudge: The Untold Chapter | Yoko | Voice role; uncredited |
| 2021 | A Day with No Name | | |
| 2021 | Ride or Die | | |
| 2021 | The Cursed Sanctuary X | Hoshino | |
| 2022 | A Man | | |
| 2022 | The Confidence Man JP: Episode of the Hero | | |
| 2023 | Nemesis: The Mystery of the Golden Spiral | Nagisa Kanda | |
| 2023 | Undercurrent | Kanae | |
| 2023 | Jigen Daisuke | Adele | |
| 2024 | Great Absence | | |
| 2025 | Kaneko's Commissary | Miwako | |
| 2026 | Kyoto Hippocrates | | |
| 2026 | Hoshi no Kyoshitsu | | |

=== TV dramas ===
| Year | Title | Role | Notes | Ref. |
|---|---|---|---|---|
| 2007 | Fūrin Kazan | Princess Miru | Taiga drama | |
| 2010 | Ryōmaden | Narasaki Ryō | Taiga drama | |
| 2021 | Nemesis | Mizuho Kanda / Nagisa Kanda | | |
| 2022 | Lost Man Found | Herself | Cameo; ep. 5 | |

=== Direct-to-video films ===
| Year | Title | Role |
|---|---|---|
| 2001 | Pelican Road | Emiko Sakura |
| 2005 | Tokyo Friends | Ryōko Fujiki |

=== Commercials ===
- Lotte - Ao Toppo (2000)
- JR East - Omiya Station version (2005)
- Meiji Seika - Xylish (2005)
- TBS and Dentsu - Green Film Project: everyday (2008)
- Shiseido - Integrate (2008)
- Lipton - The Royal (2008)

== Other works ==
=== Music ===
- "Hoshikage no Komichi" (星影の小径; "Starry Path") (2011) (Tokyo No. 1 Soul Set collaboration, on their album Subete Hikari)
- "Saisakizaka" (2013) (single, produced by Ringo Sheena)

=== Photobooks ===
- LIP (2003)
- Gekkan Maki Yoko (2007)
- Gekkan Maki Yoko Special (2008)

=== Anime ===
- Michiko to Hatchin (2008–2009) – Michiko Malandro

=== Video game ===
- Yakuza 6: The Song of Life (2016) – Kiyomi Kasahara
