= Rie Tomosaka =

Japanese actress and singer (born 1979)

- ともさか りえ
- Born: Rie Tomosaka (友坂 理恵); October 12, 1979 (age 47); Nagano City, Nagano, Japan
- Occupations: Actress; singer
- Years active: 1992–present
- Spouses: Masahiko Kawahara (m. 2003; div. 2008) Suneohair (m. 2011; div. 2016) unknown (m. 2022)
- Children: 1
- Musical career
- Origin: Mitaka, Tokyo, Japan
- Genre: J-pop
- Instrument: Vocals
- Label: EMI Music Japan
- Website: www.itoh-c.com/tomosaka/

Rie Tomosaka (ともさか りえ, Tomosaka Rie) is a Japanese actress and pop star from Mitaka-shi, Tokyo. She works for Itoh Company. From 1996 to 1997, she has released music under the name Eri Sakatomo (さかともえり, Sakatomo Eri).

== Profile ==
Tomosaka's father is a beautician. In 1998, she majored in International Culture at Teikyo University, later dropping out. In 1999, she confessed that she had an eating disorder. When she began to appear on television, her female classmates came to ignore her suddenly. In high school, her national popularity rose, causing her stress that resulted in anorexia nervosa and bulimia nervosa.

In April 2003, she married Masahiko Kawahara (河原 雅彦, Kawahara Masahiko), a theatre director and an actor, and gave birth to her son at home in October 2004. However, she announced on her blog on December 31, 2008 that they divorced.

In September 2007, her blog had about 30,000,000 monthly views. She has maintained her management relationship with Itoh Company for modelling, endorsements and acting work.

Tomosaka married Suneohair in 2011. They divorced in 2016.

On December 25, 2022, Tomosaka announces her marriage for the third time with an editor.

== Career ==
In 1992, Rie Tomosaka joined the entertainment world with the commercial film of "ESTIMA" of Toyota Motor Corporation, and she also began her career as an actress with the NHK TV drama, Kora, Nanba Shiyotto in the same year. In 1993, she came into the limelight in Subarashikikana Jinsei of Fuji TV. In 1995, she came to be known widely at the people because Kindaichi Shonen no Jikenbo, the manga-based popular TV mystery series, in which she co-starred with Domoto Tsuyoshi gained popular extremely. But, Domoto is a popular idol in Japan, so she was envied intensely by his fans.

In 1996, she also made her debut as a singer by "Escalation", and released "Kusyami" in succession. Moreover, she released "Sukini nattara KIRIN LEMON" which was the theme song of a carbonated drink which Kirin Beverage of the subsidiary of Kirin Brewery Company releases and "Docchidemo IN" which was the theme song of camera "AXIA" which Fuji Film released in the name of "Sakatomo Eri" which is a logogriph of Tomosaka Rie from 1996 to 1997.

Tomosaka released eleven singles as a vocalist, often backed by members of Yokohama horn band Big Horns Bee, who toured with her. Her singles "Cappuccino" (1999) and "Shoujo Robot" (2000) were written and produced by her friend Shina Ringo, who also provided piano and the rhythm section from her own band. Four other Ringo songs were also recorded in these sessions ("Mokuren no Cream," "Shampoo," "Ikenai Ko" and "Nihon ni Umarete"), subsequently released as b-sides and album cuts. Ringo also adds chatteringto the song "Good For Us" on Tomosaka's album "Murasaki."

"Prime Colors" (45 min., 1997) was a Tomosaka solo performance in twelve distinctive shorts released to VCD.

In 2000, she starred in the TV drama Kimiga Oshietekureta Koto for which Donna Williams's Nobody Nowhere was adapted. She played a young autistic woman, the character being inspired by the works of autistic author Donna Williams. She played splendidly the difficult role which was considerably different from the active girl whom she played till then. She was highly praised by Donna about an autistic performance and was highly regarded her talent as an actress. She won the Academy Award for Best Actress of the Drama Academy Award of "THE TELEVISION"(magazine) and of the Drama Grand Prix of "Nikkan Sports"(sports and entertainment newspaper).

In 2001, Her starring performance in the feature "Kuroe(Chloe)" contributed to the film's win at the Berlin Film Festival that year.

== Filmography ==
=== Television ===
Year	Film name	Character Name	Notes	Ref.
1995–96	The Kindaichi Case Files	Miyuki Nanase		
2023	Taiga Drama ga Umareta Hi	Chikage Awashima	Television film	
2024	She Loves to Cook, and She Loves to Eat	Yako Kaname		

=== Movies ===
Year	Film name	Character Name	Notes	Ref.
2024	April Come She Will	Nana Koizumi		
2027	A List for Tomorrow	Kyoko Kataoka	Taiwanese-Japanese film	

== Discography ==
=== Original albums ===
1. Un (1997)
2. Sakasama (さかさま, Reverse) (1997) (as Eri Sakatomo)
3. Murasaki. (むらさき。, Purple.) (1999)
4. Toridori. (トリドリ。, Various.) (2009)

=== Compilation albums ===
1. Live & Remix Rie Tomosaka vs Eri Sakatomo (1998)
2. Rie Tomosaka Best (1999)
3. Daisuki! (2000) (Taiwan only release, featuring unreleased song Hashi no Mannaka de Utattemasu (橋のまんなかで歌ってます, Singing in the Middle of the Bridge))
4. Rie Tomosaka Best+3 (2009)

=== Singles ===
1. "Escalation" (1996)
2. "Suki ni Nattara Kirin Lemon" (好きになったらキリンレモン, If I Come to Love You, Kirin Lemon) (1996) (as Eri Sakatomo)
3. "Kushami" (くしゃみ, Sneeze) (1996)
4. "Docchi demo IN" (どっちでもIN, Put It in Whichever You Like) (1996) (as Eri Sakatomo)
5. "Naichaisō yo" (泣いちゃいそうよ, I Seem to Cry) (1997)
6. "Birthday Party" (1997) (as a part of Gonna be fun, a band created for the show Ponkickies)
7. "Inazuma Musume" (稲妻娘, Lightning Girl) (1997) (as Eri Sakatomo)
8. "Futari" (2人, Us) (1997)
9. "Koishiteru" (恋してる, I'm in Love) (1998)
10. "Itoshii Toki" (愛しい時, When I Think Tenderly of You) (1998)
11. "Cappuccino" (1999)
12. "Shōjo Robot" (2000)

== Awards ==
- 4th Nikkan Sports Drama Grand Prix - Best Actress
