= Seishun no Matataki =

2011 song by Chiaki Kuriyama

Song by Chiaki Kuriyama

from the album Circus Deluxe Edition
- Released: 2011
- Recorded: 2011
- Genre: Pop rock
- Length: 4:30
- Label: Defstar Records
- Songwriter: Ringo Sheena
- Producer: Ringo Sheena

"Seishun no Matataki" (青春の瞬き; "Flicker of Youth") (also known by its French title "Le Moment") is a song by Japanese entertainer Chiaki Kuriyama, written by Ringo Sheena. It was released as the B-side to her fifth single "Tsukiyo no Shōzō" on November 23, 2011.

== Background and development ==
In March 2011, Kuriyama released "Oishii Kisetsu" / "Ketteiteki Sanpunkan", a double A-side single where both songs were produced by Ringo Sheena and performed by Tokyo Jihen. This was followed two weeks later by Circus, Kuriyama's debut album. Eight months later, Kuriyama collaborated with Sheena and Tokyo Jihen a second time on the single "Tsukiyo no Shōzō", which was eventually compiled on a deluxe edition of Circus that was released in January 2012.

== Writing and production ==
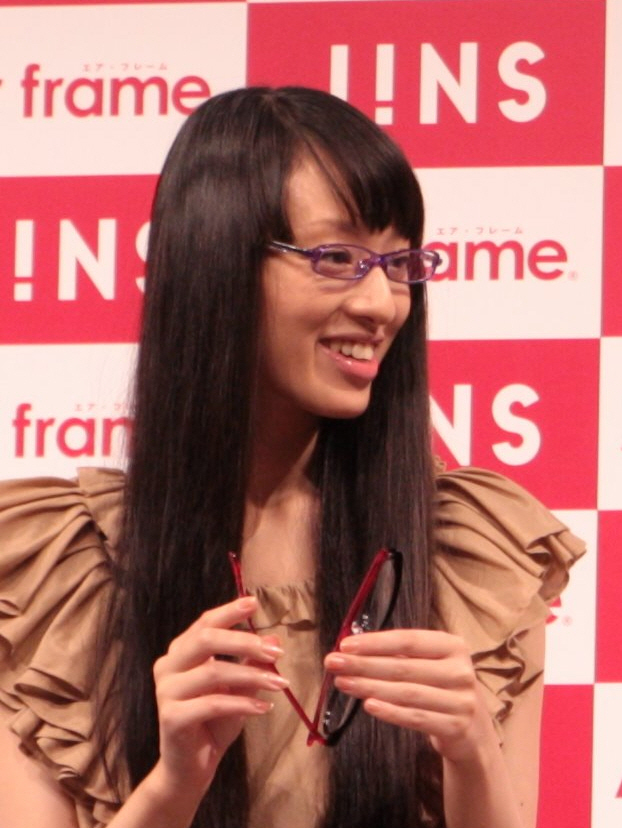
Ringo Sheena was inspired to write the song by Chiaki Kuriyama, the original performer.

"Seishun no Matataki" was recorded is sessions after the release of her debut album Circus, during which Kuriyama felt more confident as a singer. The songs were recorded with Sheena in the studio, with her band Tokyo Jihen performing the band instruments. Kuriyama first heard "Seishun no Matataki" before lyrics had been created for it, but was overwhelmed by its honest beauty. Kuriyama did not like singing ballads, and had troubles trying to put emotion into her singing. Because of this, Sheena asked her to sing the song "emotionless, like a robot." Sheena was inspired by Kuriyama when writing the song, and wrote it about Kuriyama growing up from a girl into a woman.

Kuriyama felt that adding "Tsukiyo no Shōzō" and "Seishun no Matataki" to Circus gave the album more balance.

== Critical reception ==
Kazuhiro "Scao" Ikeda of EMTG praised the song as "soft and tender" with a "comfortable groove". He felt the song showed off the "bewitching and sweet parts" of Kuriyama's vocals was impressive.

== Ringo Sheena version ==
"Seishun no Matataki"

Promotional single by Ringo Sheena

from the album Gyakuyunyū: Kōwankyoku
- Released: May 14, 2014
- Recorded: 2013
- Genre: Pop
- Length: 5:19
- Label: EMI Records Japan
- Songwriters: Ringo Sheena; Robbie Clark
- Producer: Keiichi Tomita

In 2014, writer Ringo Sheena released her own version of the song as the leading track for her album of self-covers, Gyakuyunyū: Kōwankyoku.

=== Background and development ===
During Tokyo Jihen's farewell tour held in February 2012, Bon Voyage, the band performed "Seishun no Matataki" live. This performance was broadcast on music video channels to promote the DVD release of Bon Voyage.

For Gyakuyunyū: Kōwankyoku, Sheena chose songs she had given to other musicians to record. Of the four songs she had written for Kuriyama, Sheena chose "Seishun no Matataki" and the song "Ketteiteki Sanpunkan." Sheena chose to collaborate with a different artist on each song, and for "Seishun no Matataki" decided to work with producer Keiichi Tomita, also known as Tomita Lab. Sheena first learnt about Tomita through his work with Japanese band Kirinji, who Sheena listened to in the late 1990s. Sheena had worked together with Tomita on his 2013 album Joyous, performing vocals on the three songs "Yasashii Tetsugaku", "Tokai no Yoru, Watashi no Machi" and "Kono Yo wa Fushigi." The song "Yasashii Tetsugaku" was later featured as the first track on Sheena's album Ukina (2013), which compiled collaborations she had done in the past.

The Sheena version of the song features additional lyrics in English at the final parts of the song. These additional lyrics were written by Robbie Clark. Sheena had collaborated with Clark in the past, when he wrote the lyrics to "Stem (Daimyō Asobi-hen)" and "La salle de bain" (2003), as well as several songs from Tokyo Jihen's Variety sessions in 2007: "Fukushū", "Kaban no Nakami" and "Karada."

On May 14, "Seishun no Matataki" was released on iTunes, when Gyakuyunyū: Kōwankyoku was made available to pre-order, along with the songs "Private" and "Amagasa."

=== Promotion ===
Sheena performed the song at her Chotto Shita Reco Hatsu live tour, beginning in May 2014. She also performed the song at Music Station on May 30, 2014.

=== Music video ===
Sheena passing another version of herself in the music video.

On May 14, 2014, a music video for the song was released. It was directed by long-time collaborator and current partner of Sheena, Yuichi Kodama. The official music video description described the video being about "a mysterious world where time and space go back and forth", and stating the theme of the video was "the beauty and impermanence of the present."

The video begins in the carpark from her previous music video "Netsuai Hakkakuchū" (2013), and depicts a metronome with the words "Allegretto", "Allegro", "Vivace" and "le moment" written upon it. A white ribbon is seen blowing onto a road at night, out of the grasp of Sheena. A little girl dressed in black raises her hand 90 degrees, and pours sand onto the ground. Sheena is shown hovering over top of the road as she moves along it. She is then shown reaching for a glass on a table, which moves away from her of its own accord and smashes on the ground. Sheena is shown walking along the same road as before, but passes the version of herself hovering. The little girl starts to perform gestures, which Sheena mimics. Sheena begins to perform actions of her own, which causes time to speed up and reverse. Additional scenes show Sheena walking through a hey field, and brief flashes of different global landscapes.

=== Charts ===
Chart (2014)	Peak position
Japan Billboard Adult Contemporary Airplay	61
Japan Billboard Japan Hot 100	41

=== Release history ===
Region	Date	Format	Distributing Label
Japan	May 14, 2014	Digital download	EMI Records Japan
