= Riku Onda =

Japanese writer (born 1964)

- 熊谷 奈苗
- Born: 1964 (age 61–62); Sendai, Japan
- Education: Waseda University
- Occupation: Writer
- Writing career
- Pen name: 恩田 陸
- Language: Japanese
- Genres: Fiction; Mystery; Fantasy; Essay
- Notable works: Yoru no pikunikku; Yujinia; Nakaniwa no dekigoto; Mitsubachi to enrai
- Notable awards: Yoshikawa Eiji Prize for New Writers; Japan Booksellers' Award; Mystery Writers of Japan Award; Yamamoto Shūgorō Prize; Naoki Prize

Nanae Kumagai (熊谷 奈苗, Kumagai Nanae; born 1964), known by her pen name Riku Onda (恩田 陸, Onda Riku), is a Japanese writer. Onda has won the Yoshikawa Eiji Prize for New Writers, the Japan Booksellers' Award, the Mystery Writers of Japan Award for Best Novel, the Yamamoto Shūgorō Prize, and the Naoki Prize. Her work has been adapted for film and television.

== Early life and education ==
Nanae Kumagai was born in 1964 in Aomori, Japan but raised in Sendai in Miyagi Prefecture. She graduated from Waseda University in 1987 and worked in an office for several years, then quit her job to try writing a novel after reading Ken'ichi Sakemi's 1991 novel Kōkyū shōsetsu (後宮小說).

== Career ==
Onda made her literary debut in 1992 with the novel Rokubanme no Sayoko (六番目の小夜子, The Sixth Sayoko), which was adapted into the 2000 NHK show Rokubanme no Sayoko (六番目の小夜子, Sayoko is Back) starring Anne Suzuki and Chiaki Kuriyama. More novels and adaptations followed, including the 1999 novel Mokuyō kumikyoku (木曜組曲), which was adapted into a 2002 film, and the 2000 novel Nebārando (ネバーランド, Neverland), which was adapted into a 2001 TBS television series starring Tsubasa Imai.

In 2005 Onda won the 26th Yoshikawa Eiji Prize for New Writers and the 2nd Japan Booksellers' Award Grand Prize for her novel Yoru no pikunikku (夜のピクニック, Nighttime Picnic), a story about two half-siblings participating in their school's annual hike. Yoru no pikunikku was adapted into a 2006 film of the same name, directed by Masahiko Nagasawa and starring Mikako Tabe. After being previously nominated for a 58th Mystery Writers of Japan Award for her book Q&A in 2005, Onda won the 59th Mystery Writers of Japan Award for Best Novel in 2006 for her murder mystery The Aosawa Murders (Yujinia (ユージニア)). The next year she won the 20th Yamamoto Shūgorō Prize for her book Nakaniwa no dekigoto (中庭の出来事, The Incident in the Courtyard), a complex story about a playwright writing a play about a playwright who is murdered while writing a play. Onda's 2011 novel Yumechigai (夢違, Mistaken Dreams) was adapted into the 2012 television drama My Little Nightmare (Akumu-chan), starring Keiko Kitagawa and shown on Nippon TV. My Little Nightmare: The Movie film sequel, also starring Keiko Kitagawa, premiered in 2014.

In 2017, after having been nominated six different times for the Naoki Prize, Onda won the 156th Naoki Prize for her 2016 book Mitsubachi to enrai (蜜蜂と遠雷, Honey Bee and Distant Thunder), a story about an international piano competition. To enrai also won the Japan Booksellers Award Grand Prize in 2017, making it the first instance of a book winning both. After winning the Naoki Award Onda visited her hometown of Sendai and received a special award from Mayor Emiko Okuyama.

== Awards ==
- 2005 26th Yoshikawa Eiji Prize for New Writers
- 2005 2nd Japan Booksellers' Award Grand Prize
- 2006 59th Mystery Writers of Japan Award
- 2007 20th Yamamoto Shūgorō Prize
- 2017 156th Naoki Prize (2016下)
- 2017 14th Japan Booksellers' Award Grand Prize

== Bibliography ==
=== Selected works in Japanese ===
- Rokubanme no Sayoko (六番目の小夜子, Sixth Child), Shinchosha, 1992, ISBN 9784101234113
- Mokuyō kumikyoku (木曜組曲), Tokuma Shoten, 1999, ISBN 9784198610937
- Nebārando (ネバーランド, Neverland), Shueisha, 2000, ISBN 9784087744637
- Q&A, Gentosha, 2004, ISBN 9784344006232
- Yoru no pikunikku (夜のピクニック, Nighttime Picnic), Shinchosha, 2004, ISBN 9784103971054
- Yujinia (ユージニア, Eugenia), Kadokawa Shoten, 2005, ISBN 9784048735735
- Nakaniwa no dekigoto (中庭の出来事, The Incident in the Courtyard), Shinchosha, 2006, ISBN 9784103971078
- Komorebi ni Oyogu Sakana (木洩れ日に泳ぐ魚, Fish Swimming in Dappled Sunlight), Chuokoron-Shinsha, 2007, ISBN 9784120038518
- Yumechigai (夢違), Kadokawa Shoten, 2011, ISBN 9784041100608
- Mitsubachi to enrai (蜜蜂と遠雷, Honey Bee and Distant Thunder), Gentosha, 2016, ISBN 9784344030039

=== Selected works in English ===
- "The Big Drawer", translated by Nora Stevens Heath, Speculative Japan 2, 2011
- "The Warning", translated by Mikhail S. Ignatov, Speculative Japan 3, 2012
- The Aosawa Murders, translated by Alison Watts, 2020
- Fish Swimming in Dappled Sunlight, translated by Alison Watts, 2022
- Honeybees and Distant Thunder, translated by Philip Gabriel, 2023

== Film and other adaptations ==
=== Film ===
- Mokuyō kumikyoku (木曜組曲), 2002
- Yoru no pikunikku (夜のピクニック, Nighttime Picnic), 2006
- My Little Nightmare: The Movie (Akumu-chan), 2014
- Listen to the Universe (蜜蜂と遠雷 - Mitsubachi to enrai), 2019

=== Television ===
- Rokubanme no Sayoko (六番目の小夜子, The Sixth Sayoko)
- Neverland (ネバーランド), TBS, 2001
- My Little Nightmare (Akumu-chan (悪夢ちゃん)), Nippon TV, 2012
