= Ayako Imoto =

Japanese comedian, television personality, and actress (born 1986)

- 井本 絢子
- Born: 12 January 1986 (age 40); Tottori Prefecture, Japan
- Occupations: Comedian; television personality; actress
- Years active: 2006―present
- Spouse: Shiro Ishizaki (m. 2019)
- Children: 1

Notes
- Same year/generation as: Chocolate Planet

Ayako Imoto (井本 絢子, Imoto Ayako; born 12 January 1986 in Tottori Prefecture) is a Japanese comedian, TV personality and actress.

== Biography ==
Ayako Imoto was born on 12 January 1986, in the town of Kishimoto (now part of, Hōki City), Tottori Prefecture. Imoto's family consists of her father who was a civil servant and her mother a nursery teacher. She has one younger sister.

== Career ==
Imoto graduated from the third class of the Watanabe Comedy School (run by Watanabe Entertainment). During her 3rd year, she began working in entertainment as part of the comedy duo Tokyo Horumon Musume with fellow entertainer Barbie. She began appearing on the television variety program, Sekai no hatemade itteQ, in 2007, mainly as a reporter traveling to exotic locales and confronting the wildlife, earning her the nickname "rare beast hunter" (珍獣ハンター, chinjū hantā). For her television appearances, she usually wears a sailor suit school uniform with thick painted eyebrows.

=== Attempt to climb Mount Everest ===
When Imoto reached the summit of Mount Kilimanjaro in June 2009 as part of the show Sekai no hatemade itteQ, she said that she wanted to climb Mount Everest someday. After she descended Manaslu in October 2013, she decided to climb Everest after Mr. Ishizaki, the director of the TV program who also reached the summit of Manaslu, said that if she did not, he would climb Mount Everest without her. Some mountaineering professionals opposed the project because it would make people think it was easy to climb, even though she would be employing a lot of professionals as helpers. She practiced hard in order to climb Mount Everest, but when she reached the Mount Everest base camp, thirteen Sherpas employed by another mountaineering party in Nepal died because of a major avalanche on April 18, 2014. Her Sherpas gave up the climb and Imoto abandoned the attempt. In a poll of the audience, about 44.5% wanted her to try again, but about 44.1% answered “No”. Nippon TV is considering their options.

== Personal life ==
Among celebrities in the industry, she is good friends with actress Keiko Kitagawa, with whom she co-starred in the television drama Your Home Is My Business!, fellow comedians Yuya Tegoshi, Ryoko Nakamura, and the late actress Yuko Takeuchi.

=== Marriage ===
In November 24, 2019, Imoto announced her marriage on the live broadcast of Itte Q! to the studio director, Shiro Ishizaki. On August 15, 2021, she announced that she was expecting their first child, she later gave birth to a son on January 2, 2022.

== Filmography ==
=== Film ===
- Samurai Vengeance (2026), Oyone
