= My Little Nightmare: The Movie =

Akumu-chan
- Theatrical release poster
- Directed by: Noriyoshi Sakuma
- Screenplay by: Sumio Ōmori
- Based on: Yumechigai by Riku Onda
- Produced by: Takahiro Satō; Toshiya Nomura
- Starring: Keiko Kitagawa; Gackt; Yūka
- Cinematography: Nobuyasu Kita
- Edited by: Shinji Tanaka
- Music by: Masaru Yokoyama
- Distributed by: Toho
- Release date: May 3, 2014 (Japan)
- Running time: 119 minutes
- Country: Japan
- Language: Japanese
- Box office: US$4,113,043 (Japan)

My Little Nightmare: The Movie (Japanese: 悪夢ちゃん The 夢ovie, Hepburn: Akumu-chan: Za Mūbī) is a 2014 Japanese fantasy comedy-drama film directed by Noriyoshi Sakuma. It is an adaptation of the NTV's drama My Little Nightmare which premiered in 2012. The film was released in Japan on May 3, 2014.

== Cast ==
- Keiko Kitagawa as Ayami Mutoi
- Manatsu Kimura as Yuiko Kotō
- Fumiyo Kohinata as Bannosuke Kotō
- Gackt as Takashi Shiki/Yume Ōji
- Yūka as Kotoha Hirashima

== Reception ==
As of 11 May 2014, a week after its release, the film had grossed US$4,113,043 in Japan.

== See also ==
- My Little Nightmare
