= Ketteiteki Sanpunkan =

Single by Chiaki Kuriyama

from the album Circus
- A-side: "Oishii Kisetsu"
- B-side: "Cat's Eye"
- Released: March 2, 2011
- Recorded: 2011
- Genre: Pop-rock, Rock
- Length: 4:14; 4:26
- Label: Defstar Records
- Songwriter: Ringo Sheena

Chiaki Kuriyama singles chronology
"Cold Finger Girl" (2011)	"Ketteiteki Sanpunkan" (2011)	"Tsukiyo no Shōzō" (2011)

"Ketteiteki Sanpunkan" (決定的三分間; "The Decisive Three Minutes") (stylised as "The Decisive 3min.") is one of the two songs that made up the fourth single by Japanese entertainer Chiaki Kuriyama, along with "Oishii Kisetsu". They were released on March 2, 2011, as the lead singles from her debut album Circus, released two weeks later. Both songs were produced by musician Ringo Sheena, who covered "Ketteiteki Sanpunkan" for her album Gyakuyunyū: Kōwankyoku in 2014.

== Background and development ==
After Chiaki Kuriyama debuted in early 2010 with the single "Ryūsei no Namida", she began to release collaboration singles, featuring a famous Japanese rock musician as the producer. "Kanōsei Girl" (2010) was produced by Tomoyasu Hotei, and "Cold Finger Girl" (2011) by Kenichi Asai of Blankey Jet City. In 2010, Kuriyama starred in the drama Atami no Sōsakan. The Ringo Sheena-lead band Tokyo Jihen performed the theme song for the drama, "Tengoku e Yōkoso".

== Writing and production ==
Of the two songs, "Ketteiteki Sanpunkan" was the first worked upon. Both songs featured Sheena's band Tokyo Jihen performing instruments. The band recorded together with Kuriyama, and Sheena gave pointers to Kuriyama during the sessions, asking her to use a whispering voice in "Ketteiteki Sanpunkan". "Ketteiteki Sanpunkan" was written by Sheena specifically with Chiaki Kuriyama in mind. It was written with the same concept as Tokyo Jihen's single "Nōdōteki Sanpunkan," with a BPM of 120 and a length of exactly three minutes.

The sond was first performed by Kuriyama at the Valentine Special Live concert at Shibuya-AX on February 12, 2011.

The third song on the single is a cover of Anri's "Cat's Eye", the eponymous theme song for the 1983 anime Cat's Eye.

== Promotion and release ==
Music videos were produced for both "Oishii Kisetsu" and "Ketteiteki Sanpunkan", both directed by Hiroshi Usui. Usui was a director who had previously worked with Sheena on videos such as "Kōfukuron" (1998), "Kabukichō no Joō" (1998), "Koko de Kiss Shite." (1999) and Tokyo Jihen's "Kabuki" and "Kenka Jōtō". (2006) The video for "Ketteiteki Sanpunkan" was shot in a very narrow corridor, and featured Kuriyama performing the song in a shor, blonde wig and a megaphone, as a digital time display counted down the time left in the song. Additional scenes feature Kuriyama against a projection of fish underwater, and Kuriyama in a dark room with green lasers.

On March 5, Kuriyama performed an in-store live at Tower Records in Shinjuku to promote the single. Between February 28 and March 5, promotional comments by Kuriyama appeared on Sendai FM, Cross FM, FM Port, Kiss-FM Kobe, FM OSAKA and Tokyo FM's School of Lock! Interviews appeared in February and March editions of What's In?, BLT, Pichilemon, De View 50, Otona Lab, The Japan Times and Tower. She also appeared on the Fuji TV show Sakigake! Ongaku Banzuke on March 10, 2011.

Ringo Sheena covered "Ketteiteki Sanpunkan" in 2014, on her 2014 album Gyakuyunyū: Kōwankyoku.

== Critical reception ==
Kazuhiro "Scao" Ikeda of EMTG praised the song's "noisy and suspicious atmosphere".

== Track listings ==
"Oishii Kisetsu/Ketteiteki Sanpunkan" Type A tracklist
No.	Title	Writer(s)	Arrangement	Length
1.	"Oishii Kisetsu"	Ringo Sheena	Tokyo Jihen	4:14
2.	"Ketteiteki Sanpunkan"	R. Sheena	Tokyo Jihen	3:00
3.	"Cat's Eye"	Yoshiko Miura, Yuichiro Oda	Ryo Eguchi	2:58
Total length:				10:12

"Ketteiteki Sanpunkan/Oishii Kisetsu" Type B tracklist
No.	Title	Writer(s)	Arrangement	Length
1.	"Ketteiteki Sanpunkan"	R. Sheena	Tokyo Jihen	3:00
2.	"Oishii Kisetsu"	R. Sheena	Tokyo Jihen	4:14
3.	"Cat's Eye"	Y. Miura, Y. Oda	R. Eguchi	2:58
Total length:				10:12

== Charts and sales ==
Chart (2011)	Peak position
Japan Oricon weekly singles: "Oishii Kisetsu/Ketteiteki Sanpunkan"	37

=== Sales and certifications ===
Chart	Amount
Oricon physical sales: "Oishii Kisetsu/Ketteiteki Sanpunkan"	4,000

== Release history ==
Region	Date	Format	Distributing Label	Catalogue codes
Japan	February 16, 2011	Ringtone	Defstar Records	
Japan	March 2, 2011	CD, digital download	Defstar Records	DFCL-1759, DFCL-1760
Japan	March 19, 2011	Rental CD	Defstar Records	DFCL-1759, DFCL-1760
