= Your Home Is My Business! =

Japanese television drama/comedy series

- Genre: Comedy
- Starring: Keiko Kitagawa
- Country of origin: Japan
- Original language: Japanese
- No. of series: 2
- No. of episodes: 21

Original release
- Network: NTV
- Release: 13 July – 14 September 2016

Your Home Is My Business! (家売るオンナ, Ieuru Onna; stylized Your Home is My Business!) is a Japanese television drama/comedy series, which premiered on NTV on July 13, 2016, starring Keiko Kitagawa in the lead role. Machi Sangenya is a real-estate salesperson whose motto is "There isn't a house I can't sell."

A one-episode special, Your Home Is My Business! Returns (帰ってきた家売るオンナ, Kaettekita Ieuru Onna), aired in 2017. A sequel Your Home Is My Business!: 2nd Attack (家売るオンナの逆襲, Ieuru Onna no Gyakushū) aired in 2019. Kazuyoshi Saito wrote "Are" (アレ) to be the theme song of the sequel.

== Cast ==
- Keiko Kitagawa as Machi Sangenya
- Asuka Kudo as Seiji Niwano
- Yudai Chiba as Satoshi Adachi
- Ayako Imoto as Mika Shirasu
- Hiroki Suzuki as Daisuke Hachinohe
- Yuko Araki as Madoka Murota
- Chikara Honda as Takuma Gota
- Asami Usuda as Kokoro Tamaki
- Zen Kajihara as Makoto Fuse
- Tōru Nakamura as Dai Yashiro
- Tomie Kataoka as Satomi Handa
