= Mamiya kyodai =

- DVD cover
- Directed by: Yoshimitsu Morita
- Screenplay by: Yoshimitsu Morita
- Starring: Kuranosuke Sasaki; Muga Tsukaji; Miyuki Nakajima; Takako Tokiwa; Erika Sawajiri
- Distributed by: Kadokawa Pictures
- Release date: May 13, 2006 (Japan)
- Running time: 119 minutes
- Country: Japan
- Language: Japanese

The Mamiya Brothers (Japanese: 間宮兄弟, Hepburn: Mamiya kyōdai) is a 2006 Japanese comedy film written and directed by Yoshimitsu Morita, based on a novel by Kaori Ekuni. The film's theme, Hey, brother, was performed by Rip Slyme.

== Plot ==
The film follows two thirty-something eccentric brothers (Akinobu and Tetsunobu), who are also each other's best friends. Their mundane lives change when sisters Naomi and Yumi accept their invitations to a party and the brothers have to decide if they are ready to exchange their happy existence for the vicissitudes of love.

== Cast ==
- Kuranosuke Sasaki as Akinobu Mamiya
- Muga Tsukaji as Tetsunobu Mamiya
- Miyuki Nakajima as Junko Mamiya
- Takako Tokiwa as Yoriko Kuzuhara
- Erika Sawajiri as Naomi Honma
- Keiko Kitagawa as Yumi Honma
- Hiromi Iwasaki as Miyoko Anzai
- Ryūta Satō as Kota
