= Rokubanme no Sayoko =

- Starring: Anne Suzuki; Chiaki Kuriyama
- Country of origin: Japan
- Original language: Japanese
- No. of episodes: 12

Original release
- Network: NHK E
- Release: April 8 – June 24, 2000

Rokubanme no Sayoko (六番目の小夜子) also known as The 6th Sayoko is a Japanese television series which was produced in the year 2000. It is the adaptation of a novel by Riku Onda.

== Story ==
Nishihama Junior High School is haunted by the legend of Sayoko. Every three years a student is chosen to play the role of Sayoko by his or her predecessor. Sayoko has three missions to accomplish. If they are completed it is to the advantage of the school. If not, the school is doomed... Shu has been chosen to be Sayoko. Disbelieving the legend, Shu lets his pal Rei assume the role. But, when the new term begins, one of the tasks has already been completed. By whom? This is just the prelude to a string of spooky happenings. "Sayoko is Back" is no ordinary horror story. The youngsters explore the unknown while caught up in the drama of adolescence. It is an occasionally frightening but ultimately heart-warming journey that they undertake.

== Cast ==
- Anne Suzuki as Rei Shioda
- Chiaki Kuriyama as Sayoko Tsumura
- Takayuki Yamada as Shū Sekine
- Ryō Katsuji as Yukio Karasawa
- Marika Matsumoto as Masako Hanamiya
- Yuka Hirata as Tōko Hirabayashi
- Masato Furuoya as Takao Karasawa
- Sae Isshiki as Mikako Sano
- Jun Miho as Mayumi Shioda
- Takehiro Murata as Mr. Kurokawa
- Yumi Takigawa as Chika Sekine
- Manami Fuji as Yurie Tsumura
- Hinako Sano as The little girl
- Ayumi Ikeda as The silhouette of Sayoko

== Episodes ==
The entire series consists of 12 episodes in all.

- Episode 1: Nazo no tenkosei
- Episode 2: Borei
- Episode 3: Mie nai teki
- Episode 4: Nazo no massage
- Episode 5: Fushigi na utagoe
- Episode 6: Tanabata no himitsu
- Episode 7: Wana
- Episode 8: Kyofu no bunkasai part 1
- Episode 9: Kyofu no bunkasai part 2
- Episode 10: Sayoko ha koko ni iru
- Episode 11: Sayoko no shotai
- Episode 12: Soshite tobira ga hiraku
