= Circus (Chiaki Kuriyama album) =

Studio album by Chiaki Kuriyama
- Released: March 16, 2011
- Recorded: 2010–2011
- Genre: Rock, pop
- Length: 42:53
- Language: Japanese, English
- Label: Defstar Records

Singles from Circus
- 1. "Kanōsei Girl" Released: November 17, 2010; 2. "Cold Finger Girl" Released: January 26, 2011; 3. "Oishii Kisetsu / Ketteiteki Sanpunkan" Released: March 2, 2011; 4. "Tsukiyo no Shōzō" Released: November 23, 2011

Circus (stylised as CIRCUS) is the debut studio album by Japanese musician and actress Chiaki Kuriyama, which was released on March 16, 2011. Kuriyama collaborated with famous Japanese and overseas rock musicians to create the album. In January 2012, the album was re-released as a deluxe edition, featuring the single "Tsukiyo no Shōzō" and its B-side "Seishun no Matataki""

== Background and development ==
Kuriyama made her musical debut in early 2010, with the single "Ryūsei no Namida" that was used as the theme song for the anime Mobile Suit Gundam Unicorn. Her next two singles were also used for anime: "Kanōsei Girl" (2010) was used as the third opening theme song for Yorinuki Gintama-san and "Cold Finger Girl" as the opening theme song for Level E.

After "Ryūsei no Namida", Kuriyama wanted to collaborate with many of her favourite musicians. She was asked by her musical director to draw up a list of her favourite musicians, and her staff asked them if they wanted to write music for Kuriyama. All of the musicians on the list accepted. From her second single, "Kanōsei Girl", Kuriyama began collaborating with famous rock musicians on her singles. "Kanōsei Girl" was produced by Tomoyasu Hotei, while "Cold Finger Girl" was produced by Kenichi Asai, and "Oishii Kisetsu" / "Ketteiteki Sanpunkan" by Ringo Sheena.

== Writing and production ==
In addition to the single songs, all the tracks on the album were produced by famous rock musicians. "Roulette de Kuchizuke o" was written by Takuro Sugawara and Yoshimitsu Taki of the band 9mm Parabellum Bullet, "Mirai no Hikari" by Does member Wataru Ujihara and Ryō Eguchi of Stereo Fabrication of Youth fame. "Shinkai" was written by Atsushi Sakurai and Hidehiko Hoshino from the band Buck-Tick, "Gokoku Hōjō Rock" was written and produced by Theatre Brook vocalist Taiji Satō and "New Moon Day" by Tōru Hidaka, former member of Beat Crusaders and Monobright. Two songs were written by overseas rock musicians: "Kuchi ni Shita Love" was produced by Australian band Jet members Chris Cester and Mark Wilson, and "Ladies & Gentlemen" by Third Eye Blind members Stephan Jenkins and Kryz Reid. Both songs featured lyrics by Junji Ishiwatari, a member of the band Supercar and a famous producer.

Hidaka was inspired by "Kanōsei Girl" to write a glam rock song for Kuiryama. Ujihara was asked to make a song for Kuriyama in the "fast-paced style" of the songs he writes for Does.

"Tsukiyo no Shōzō" and "Seishun no Matataki" were recorded after the album's release, when Kuriyama was feeling more confident as a vocalist. She felt that adding these to songs to the deluxe edition the album more balance.

The album title refers to the great variety of songs found on the album.

== Critical reception ==
Kazuhiro "Scao" Ikeda of EMTG praised the album, feeling as if Kuriyama was being an actress, taking on the roles set for her by each musician. He praised "Roulette de Kuchizuke o" for its "thudding, edgy sound" and thrilling 1970s pop-style dramaticness. He described "Oishii Kisetsu" as "bewitching and cute", and praised "Ketteiteki Sanpunkan"'s "noisy and suspicious atmosphere", and found "Kanōsei Girl"'s "sprinting and rising feelings...liberating". CDJournal reviewers believed the album was "edgy and personal", and praised Kuriyama for having a natural vocal sense.

== Commercial reception ==
The album debuted at number 19 on Oricon's weekly album charts, and remained in the top 300 for five weeks. When the album was re-released in 2012, it reached number 86, and charted for another two weeks. Cumulatively, the album has sold 12,000 copies.

== Track listing ==
Standard edition
No.	Title	Writer(s)	Arranger	Length
1.	"Roulette de Kuchizuke o" (ルーレットでくちづけを Rūretto de Kuchizuke o, "Roulette Kiss")	Takuro Sugawara, Yoshimitsu Taki	9mm Parabellum Bullet	3:08
2.	"Cold Finger Girl" (コールドフィンガーガール Kōrudofingāgāru)	Kenichi Asai	Pontiacs	3:08
3.	"Oishii Kisetsu"	Ringo Sheena	R. Sheena	4:12
4.	"Mirai no Hikari" (ミライノ・ヒカリ "Future Light")	Wataru Ujihara	Ryō Eguchi	3:42
5.	"Ketteiteki Sanpunkan"	R. Sheena	R. Sheena	3:00
6.	"Kuchi ni Shita Love" (口にしたLOVE "Love in My Mouth")	Junji Ishiwatari, Chris Cester, Mark Wilson	C. Cester, M. Wilson	2:40
7.	"Shinkai" (深海 "Deep Seas")	Atsushi Sakurai, Hidehiko Hoshino	H. Hoshino	4:20
8.	"Kanōsei Girl" (可能性ガール Kanōsei Gāru, "Girl with Potential")	J. Ishiwatari, Tomoyasu Hotei	T. Hotei	4:40
9.	"Gokoku Hōjō Rock" (五穀豊穣ROCK, "Great Harvest Rock")	Taiji Satō	T. Satō	5:58
10.	"Ladies & Gentlemen"	J. Ishiwatari, Stephan Jenkins, Kryz Reid	S. Jenkins, K. Reid	3:18
11.	"New Moon Day"	Tōru Hidaka	T. Hidaka	4:00
Total length:				42:53

DVD
No.	Title	Director	Length
1.	"Oishii Kisetsu (MV)"	Hiroshi Usui
2.	"Ketteiteki Sanpunkan (MV)"	H. Usui
3.	"Cold Finger Girl Rock Short Film"	Shuichi Banba
4.	"Kanōsei Girl (MV)"	Hiderō Asakawa
5.	"Oishii Kisetsu / Ketteiteki Sanpunkan Music Video making of"	H. Usui
6.	"Ryūsei no Namida (MV)" (流星のナミダ "Meteor Tears", bonus track.)	Masashi Mutō

Deluxe edition
No.	Title	Writer(s)	Arranger	Length
1.	"Roulette de Kuchizuke o"	T. Sugawara, Y. Taki	9mm Parabellum Bullet	3:08
2.	"Tsukiyo no Shōzō"	R. Sheena	R. Sheena	3:49
3.	"Kuchi ni Shita Love"	J. Ishiwatari, C. Cester, M. Wilson	C. Cester, M. Wilson	2:40
4.	"Seishun no Matataki"	R. Sheena	R. Sheena	4:30
5.	"Oishii Kisetsu"	R. Sheena	R. Sheena	4:12
6.	"Cold Finger Girl"	K. Asai	Pontiacs	3:08
7.	"Mirai no Hikari"	W. Ujihara	R. Eguchi	3:42
8.	"Ketteiteki Sanpunkan"	R. Sheena	R. Sheena	3:00
9.	"Shinkai"	A. Sakurai, H. Hoshino	H. Hoshino	4:20
10.	"Kanōsei Girl"	J. Ishiwatari, T. Hotei	T. Hotei	4:40
11.	"Gokoku Hōjō Rock"	T. Satō	T. Satō	5:58
12.	"Ladies & Gentlemen"	J. Ishiwatari, S. Jenkins, K. Reid	S. Jenkins, K. Reid	3:18
13.	"New Moon Day"	T. Hidaka	T. Hidaka	4:00
Total length:				51:12

Deluxe edition DVD
No.	Title	Director	Length
1.	"Tsukiyo no Shōzō (MV)"	Takumi Shiga and Yuichi Kodama
2.	"Oishii Kisetsu (MV)"	Hiroshi Usui
3.	"Ketteiteki Sanpunkan (MV)"	H. Usui
4.	"Cold Finger Girl Rock Short Film"	Shuichi Banba
5.	"Kanōsei Girl (MV)"	Hiderō Asakawa
6.	"Oishii Kisetsu / Ketteiteki Sanpunkan Music Video making of"	H. Usui
7.	"Ryūsei no Namida (MV)" (bonus track)	Masashi Mutō

== Charts ==
Chart (2011)	Peak position
Japan Oricon weekly albums	19

=== Sales and certifications ===
Chart	Amount
Oricon physical sales	12,000

== Release history ==
Region	Date	Format	Distributing Label	Catalogue codes
Japan	March 16, 2011	CD, CD/DVD, digital download	Sony Music	DFCL-1761~2, DFCL-1763
Japan	April 2, 2011	Rental CD	Sony Music	DFCL-1761~2, DFCL-1763
Taiwan	May 6, 2011	CD	Sony Music	88697857832
Hong Kong	May 27, 2011	CD	Sony Music	88697857832
Japan	January 11, 2012	Deluxe CD, deluxe CD/DVD, deluxe digital download	Sony Music	DFCL-1825, DFCL-1826~7
Japan	January 28, 2012	Deluxe rental CD	Sony Music	DFCL-1825, DFCL-1826~7
