= Shikoku (film) =

1999 Japanese supernatural thriller film

- Japanese film poster
- Directed by: Shunichi Nagasaki
- Screenplay by: Kunimi Manda; Takenori Sendo
- Story by: Masako Bando
- Produced by: Yasushi Tsuge; Masao Nagai
- Starring: Yui Natsukawa; Michitaka Tsutsui; Chiaki Kuriyama; Toshie Negishi; Ren Osugi; Makoto Satō
- Cinematography: Noboru Sinoda
- Edited by: Yoshiyuki Okuhara
- Music by: Satoshi Kadokura
- Production company: Asmik Ace Entertainment
- Distributed by: Toho
- Release date: January 23, 1999 (Japan)
- Running time: 100 minutes
- Country: Japan
- Language: Japanese

Shikoku (Japanese: 死国; lit. Land of the Dead) is a 1999 Japanese supernatural thriller film directed by Shunichi Nagasaki and written by Kunimi Manda and Takenori Sento.

== Plot summary ==
Years after moving to Tokyo with her parents, Hinako returns to her hometown in rural Shikoku. She soon learns that her childhood friend, Sayori, died several years ago and that Sayori's mother, a Shinto priestess who used to perform séances and exorcisms, has gone almost insane with grief. After seeing Sayori's yūrei several times during the night, Hinako consults with some local experts on the paranormal and discovers that Sayori's mother has something planned for her daughter.

== Cast ==
- Yui Natsukawa as Hinako Myoujin
- Michitaka Tsutsui as Fumiya Akizawa
- Chiaki Kuriyama as Sayori Hiura
- Toshie Negishi as Teruko Hiura (Sayori's mother)
- Ren Osugi as Yasutaka Hiura (Sayori's father)
- Makoto Satō as Sendo
- Taro Suwa as Oda
- Tomoko Otakara as Yukari Asakawa
- Haduki Kōzu as Chizuko Oono

== Release ==
Shikoku was released in Japan on January 23, 1999, where it was distributed by Toho. It was released as a double feature with Ring 2. Shikoku was later shown at the Vancouver International Film Festival as part of a program of modern Japanese horror films at the festival, including Ring, Ring 2, Audition and Gemini.

The film was released directly to video in the United States on October 26, 2004 by Adness.

== Reception ==
Jasper Sharp writing for Midnight Eye referred to the film as a "pedestrian addition to the late 1990s horror boom." He added: "Hideo Nakata's high-concept popcorn movie Ring had proven pretty convincingly that the supernatural could be a lucrative cash cow in late-1990s recessional Japan. A contract job, co-written by one of Ring's original producers, Takenori Sento, and circulating on the lower half of a double bill with Ring 2, Shikoku is less an indication of either Bando or Nagasaki's thematic interests than an obvious attempt to milk the current interest in horror before it dried up. As such, it doesn't deviate too far from the path forged by its model in either style or formula."

John Kenneth Muir in his book Horror Films of the 1990s gave the film a three and a half star rating out of five, finding the film "Beautifully shot and visually realized" and that the film had "more on its mind than scary dead girls with long hair".
