= Yūka (actress) =

Japanese actress (born 1980)

- 優香
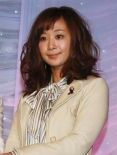
- Yūka in 2011
- Born: Hiroko Okabe; 27 June 1980 (age 46); Tachikawa, Tokyo, Japan
- Occupations: Actress; tarento
- Years active: 1997–present
- Agent: Horipro
- Known for: Honjitsu wa Taian Nari; Akumu-chan; Black Butler
- Spouse: Munetaka Aoki (m. 2016)
- Children: 1
- Website: horipro.co.jp/yuka

Hiroko Okabe (岡部 広子, Okabe Hiroko; born 27 June 1980), known professionally as Yūka (優香, Yūka), is a Japanese actress, presenter, and former gravure idol. She is known for playing the lead role in NHK's drama Honjitsu wa Taian Nari and presenting the TBS variety show Ōsama no Brunch. From 1999 to 2001, she received the Golden Arrow Award every year. In 2003, she was given both a Golden Graph Award and the Japan Academy Prize for Best Newcomer.

== Appearances ==
=== Films ===
- Koi ni Utaeba (2002), Yumi Sakurai
- Boku no Songokū (2003), Songokū
- Reincarnation (2005), Nagisa Sugiura
- Taishibōkei Tanita no Shain Shokudō (2013), Nanako Haruno
- Black Butler (2014), Hanae Wakatsuki
- Akumu-chan (2014), Kotoha Hirashima
- Wood Job! (2014), Miki Īda
- Galaxy Turnpike (2015), Rei
- Jinsei no Yakusoku (2016), Yukiko Ōba
- Over the Fence (2016), Yoko Ogata
- The Blue Hearts (2017)
- Gokko (2017)
- Hitsuji no Ki (2018), Rieko Ōta
- You Shine in the Moonlit Night (2019)
- Tokyo Taxi (2025), Kaoru Usami

=== TV dramas ===
- Ao no Jidai (TBS, 1998), Yuka
- The Sun Never Sets (Fuji TV, 2000), Ami Isetani
- 20-sai no Kekkon (TBS, 2000), Renko Chūganji
- Love Story (TBS, 2001), Kano Kobayashi
- Zoku Heisei Fūfu Jawan (NTV, 2002)
- Yūkaza Cinema (TV Asahi, 2002)
- Yonimo Kimyō na Monogatari: Dramatic Syndrome (Fuji TV, 2001)
- Honto ni Atta Kowai Hanashi 3 (Fuji TV, 2003)
- Taiga drama Shinsengumi! (NHK, 2004)
- Yonimo Kimyō na Monogatari: Aketekure (Fuji TV, 2004)
- Hoshi ni Negai o: 7jōma de Umareta 410-man no Hoshi (Fuji TV, 2005), Yōko Satō
- Renai Shōsetsu "Duke" (TBS, 2006), Kōko Tachibana
- 24-jikan Terebi Ai wa Chikyū o Sukuu "Yūki" (NTV, 2006), Yoshie
- Oishinbo (Fuji TV, 2007-2009), Yūko Kurita
- Maru Maru Chibi Maruko Chan Episode 3 (Fuji TV, 2007)
- Shinjitsu no Shuki BC Kyū Senpan Katō Tetsutarō "Watashi wa Kai ni Naritai" (NTV, 2007), Fujiko Katō
- Gout Temps Nouveau (KTV, 2007), Yūka Tanaka
- Maō Episode 4-7 (TBS, 2008), Makiko Naruse
- Koi no Karasawagi: Love Stories V "Sōgiya no Onna" (NTV, 2008), Yuri Honda
- Kochira Katsushika-ku Kameari Kōen-mae Hashutsujo Episode 8 (TBS, 2009), Teacher Izumi
- My Girl (TV Asahi, 2009), Yōko Tsukamoto
- Bungō: Nihon Bungaku Cinema "Ōgon Fūkei" (TBS, 2010), Okei
- Kono Sekai no Katasumi ni (NTV, 2011)
- T-UP presents Thumbs Up! (BS Fuji, 2011), Hana
- Honjitsu wa Taian Nari (NHK, 2012), Takako Yamai
- Papadol! (TBS, 2012), Haruka Hanamura
- Akumu-chan (NTV, 2012), Kotoha Hirashima
- Hakuba no Ōji-sama (NTV, 2013), Takako Hara
- Hell Teacher Nūbē (NTV, 2014), Minako
- Carolling: Christmas no Kiseki (NHK BS, 2014), Sūko Orihara
- Taiga drama Hana Moyu (NHK, 2015), Sugihisa
- Chikaemon (NHK, 2016), Osode
- Rinshō Hanzai Gakusha Himura Hideo no Suiri (NTV, 2016), Nozomi Ono
- Hi no Ko (Tōkai TV, 2016), Yukimi Kajima
- Hitoshi Ueki and Nobosemon (NHK, 2017), Tomiko
- Ieyasu, Edo wo Tateru (NHK, 2019)

=== Dubbing ===
- Bunshinsaba (2004), Lee Yoo-jin
- Ice Age: The Meltdown (2006), Ellie
- Strings (2007), Jhinna

== Bibliography ==
=== Books ===
- Hirune no Honne (Kadokawa Shoten, October 2000) ISBN 4048836293
- Air (Shogakukan, June 2002) ISBN 4094190260

=== Photobooks ===
- ZIP (Eichi Shuppan, April 1998) ISBN 4754211901
- Vim with Rei Yoshii (Eichi Shuppan, April 1998) ISBN 4754211898
- Sirena (TIS, 1998) ISBN 4886181791
- Perfume (Wani Books, April 1999) ISBN 4847025288
- Yūka CF Special Carat (Futabasha, July 2000) ISBN 4575472794
- Innocent Yūka (Shueisha, April 2000) ISBN 4087803058
- Memories of Innocent Yūka (Shueisha, May 2000) ISBN 4087803090
- Koi ni Utaeba (Kadokawa Shoten, October 2002) ISBN 4048535269
- Yūka Body (Kodansha, March 2012) ISBN 4062175495
- Yūka Gravure (Kodansha, March 2012) ISBN 4062175487
- Yūka Gravure Tokusōban (Kodansha, March 2012) ISBN 4062176491

== Awards ==
- The 36th Golden Arrow Award: Graph Award (1999)
- The 37th Golden Arrow Award: Best Newcomer and Newcomer for Broadcasting Award (2000)
- The 38th Golden Arrow Award: Broadcasting Award (2001)
- The 26th Japan Academy Prize: Best Newcomer (2003)
- The 40th Golden Arrow Award: Golden Graph Award (2003)
