= Mop Girl =

- Genre: Comedy, mystery, fantasy
- Starring: Keiko Kitagawa; Shōsuke Tanihara
- Opening theme: Destination Nowhere (ERIKA)
- Country of origin: Japan
- Original language: Japanese
- No. of episodes: 10

Production
- Executive producer: Katayama Osamu
- Producer: Nakagawa Noriko
- Production location: Tokyo
- Running time: 60 min./episode

Original release
- Network: TV Asahi
- Release: October 12 – December 14, 2007

Mop Girl (モップガール, Moppu Gāru) is a television drama series based on the novel of the same title by Miaki Kato (加藤実秋, Kato Miaki); it recounts the adventures of Momoko Hasegawa, played by Keiko Kitagawa, who possesses the ability to travel back in time upon contact with belongings of a deceased person with unfinished business in life. She then has the chance to prevent the death of the would-be deceased.

== Plot ==
Momoko Hasegawa, a girl who dreams of being a wedding planner is transferred to Little Angels, a subsidiary company of her employer that provides funeral services, following a disastrous incident in a wedding ceremony at the hotel. She acquires the ability to travel back in time at the age of ten, when she is involved in a traffic accident but is saved by a mysterious woman, who passes the ability to her shortly before succumbing to her wound. Years later, she finally learns that the trigger to activating her ability is by touching an important item which belonged to a deceased person that held some sort of significance for them. She uses this ability to travel in time and prevents the death of the deceased persons she encounters on her line of work.

== Cast ==
- Keiko Kitagawa as Momoko Hasegawa (長谷川桃子, Hasegawa Momoko)

Momoko is a young salary woman working for Little Angel, a funeral services provider that handles a variety of cases. Despite having a low-paying job and living in a rundown apartment, she is actually the daughter of a wealthy family in the hospital business. She has a special ability to travel back in time, which she acquired in a traffic accident at a young age. This ability only becomes fully developed after she is transferred to Little Angel, as it is revealed that touching mementos which hold great significance to the deceased would activate her time-travel abilities. Throughout the series, she attempts to use this ability to travel back in time to prevent the deaths of the would-be deceased persons with unfinished business. She is obsessed with muscles.

- Shōsuke Tanihara as Shoutarou Otomo (大友将太郎, Otomo Shoutarou)

A senior colleague of Momoko in Little Angel. Shoutarou may be cruel towards Momoko sometimes, but has always come to Momoko's aid, often under threat by Momoko to reveal his secrets. He is especially interested in foreign ladies gaijin, a weakness exploited by Momoko to get him into helping her. He has a variety of skills, including picking locks, stealth infiltration, deception, and intelligence gathering; Momoko comments that he should "become a professional criminal" rather than being in the funeral business.

- Reina Asami as Hina Okouchi (大河内日奈, Okouchi Hina)

Hina is Momoko's closest friend from high school who is a Haken at a publication company. Because of her connection, Momoko sometimes asks her for help when attempting to change the future/past, and she has proven to be very helpful in some cases.

- Sousuke Takaoka as Akira Wakayama (若山朗, Wakayama Akira)

A colleague of Momoko. Akira thinks very little of Momoko, who he sometimes considers a burden, and is often seen criticizing Momoko at work. He also has a crush on Tamaki, who takes no interest in him.

- Jiro Sato as Shigeo Higashi (東重男, Higashi Shigeo)

The president of Little Angel. Shigeo is a soft-spoken, middle-aged man who is always smiling and caring towards his subordinates. He is sometimes criticized by Akira for being too tolerant to Momoko's strange behavior.

- Natsuna Watanabe as Tamaki Nakamura (中村環, Nakamura Tamaki)

Female high school student who works part-time at Little Angel. She is the subject of Akira's crush, and is often annoyed by Akira's attempts at asking her out.

- Shoko Ikezu as Miki Kataoka (片岡未樹, Kataoka Miki)

Female colleague of Momoko. She is in charge of the general administration matters at Little Angels – something she takes great pride in. Her appetite is unrivaled.

- Magy as Atsushi Yokouchi (横内淳, Yokouchi Atsushi)

The assistant police inspector. He is continually flustered by his overbearing wife.

- Dr. Hirotaro Honda as Ryuji Hasegawa (長谷川隆冶, Hasegawa Ryuji)

Momoko's father and the president of William Hasegawa Memorial Hospital.

- Mayumi Hori as the mysterious woman

The mysterious woman appears only in flash back scenes. After saving a young Momoko from a potentially fatal traffic accident, she passes the ability of time-traveling to Momoko shortly before her succumbing to her injuries. Later revealed to be Hazuki Yoko the former girlfriend of Shoutarou Otomo. It's implied that Otomo may know about her ability.

== Episode Ratings ==
Episode	Broadcast Date	Episode Title	Rating		
Episode	Broadcast Date	Episode Title	Kantō region	Kansai region	Nationwide
01	October 12	Sōgi gaisha no bishōjo wa shitai wo sukuu (葬儀会社の美少女は死体を救う) "At the undertakers' a young beauty saves corpses"	10.2%	n/a	n/a
02	October 19	Serebu hanayome wa satsujin ga osuki (セレブ花嫁は殺人がお好き!!) "Celeb bride loves homicide!!"	10.7%	n/a	n/a
03	October 26	Aidoru giin no himitsu wa mitsu no aji (アイドル議員の秘密は蜜の味!?) "Idol legislator's secret tastes of honey!?"	11.8%	n/a	n/a
04	November 2	Meido momoko, Akihabara de ai wo sakebu (メイド桃子、秋葉原で愛を叫ぶ) "Momoko the maid screams love in Akihabara"	09.7%	n/a	n/a
05	November 9	Yōgisha Azuma shachō no nazo wo oe (容疑者・東社長の謎を追え!!) "Go after the suspect, president Azuma and his secret!!"	09.8%	n/a	n/a
06	November 16	Gurabia aidoru no yume wa yoru hiraku (グラビアアイドルの夢は夜ひらく!?) "Pin-up idol's dreams bloom in the night"	10.6%	n/a	n/a
07	November 23	Nozokareta!? Onna kyōshi no himitsu no hokenshitsu (覗かれた!?女教師の秘密の保健室) "Voyeurs!? Female teacher's secret school infirmary"	09.8%	n/a	n/a
08	November 30	Nazo no hentai sakka shūdan!? Satsui no utage e yōkoso (謎の変態作家集団!?殺意の宴へようこそ) "Mysterious clique of pervert authors!? Welcome to the banquet of murderous intent"	10.4%	n/a	n/a
09	December 7	Jumyō ichi nichi... Yakuza no nijū nen ai! Yakusoku no chi e (寿命1日…ヤクザの20年愛！約束の地へ) "One day left to live.. A yakuza's 20-year love affair! To the promised land"	09.2%	n/a	n/a
10	December 14	Momoko shisu.. Sayonara Ōtomo san! (桃子死す…さよなら大友さん!) "Momoko is dead.. Sayonara Ōtomo san!"	9.4%	n/a	n/a
Average	–	–	10.2%	n/a	n/a
