= Oishii Kisetsu =

"Oishii Kisetsu/Ketteiteki Sanpunkan"

Single by Chiaki Kuriyama

from the album Circus
- A-side: "Ketteiteki Sanpunkan"
- B-side: "Cat's Eye"
- Released: March 2, 2011
- Recorded: 2011
- Genre: Pop-rock; Rock
- Length: 4:14; 4:26
- Label: Defstar Records
- Songwriter: Ringo Sheena

Chiaki Kuriyama singles chronology
"Cold Finger Girl" (2011)	"Oishii Kisetsu/Ketteiteki Sanpunkan" (2011)	"Tsukiyo no Shōzō" (2011)

"Oishii Kisetsu" (おいしい季節; "The Tasty Season") (also known by its English title "The Creamy Season") is one of the two songs that made up the fourth single by Japanese entertainer Chiaki Kuriyama, along with "Ketteiteki Sanpunkan". They were released on March 2, 2011, as the lead singles from her debut album Circus, released two weeks later. Both songs were produced by musician Ringo Sheena.

== Background and development ==
After Chiaki Kuriyama debuted in early 2010 with the single "Ryūsei no Namida", she began to release collaboration singles, featuring a famous Japanese rock musician as the producer. "Kanōsei Girl" (2010) was produced by Tomoyasu Hotei, and "Cold Finger Girl" (2011) by Kenichi Asai of Blankey Jet City. In 2010, Kuriyama starred in the drama Atami no Sōsakan. The Ringo Sheena-lead band Tokyo Jihen performed the theme song for the drama, "Tengoku e Yōkoso".

== Writing and production ==
Of the two songs, "Oishii Kisetsu" was produced second, after "Ketteiteki Sanpunkan" had been created. Both songs featured Sheena's band Tokyo Jihen performing instruments. The band recorded together with Kuriyama, and Sheena gave pointers to Kuriyama during the sessions, asking her to sing the song in a louder voice. The song was written by Sheena about a regular girl who was in love, as opposed to a song written with Kuriyama in mind.

The third song on the single is a cover of Anri's "Cat's Eye", the eponymous theme song for the 1983 anime Cat's Eye.

== Promotion and release ==
Music videos were produced for both "Oishii Kisetsu" and "Ketteiteki Sanpunkan", both directed by Hiroshi Usui. Usui was a director who had previously worked with Sheena on videos such as "Kōfukuron" (1998), "Kabukichō no Joō" (1998), "Koko de Kiss Shite." (1999) and Tokyo Jihen's "Kabuki" and "Kenka Jōtō". (2006) The video for "Oishii Kisetsu" features Kuriyama performing the song into a standing microphone, in a room with a high ceiling with other musicians. Additional scenes feature Kuriyama performing the song while sitting at a chair in a different outfit. Kuriyama wears a Vivienne Westwood armour ring while performing the song; a ring that Sheena wore during her early career.

On March 5, Kuriyama performed an in-store live at Tower Records in Shinjuku to promote the single. Between February 28 and March 5, promotional comments by Kuriyama appeared on Sendai FM, Cross FM, FM Port, Kiss-FM Kobe, FM OSAKA and Tokyo FM's School of Lock! Interviews appeared in February and March editions of What's In?, BLT, Pichilemon, De View 50, Otona Lab, The Japan Times and Tower. She also appeared on the Fuji TV show Sakigake! Ongaku Banzuke on March 10, 2011.

During Tokyo Jihen's farewell tour held in February 2012, Bon Voyage, Tokyo Jihen performed "Oishii Kisetsu" live. Sheena performed "Oishii Kisetsu" again during her solo Tōtaikai concerts in November 2013.

== Critical reception ==
Kazuhiro "Scao" Ikeda of EMTG praised the song, calling it "bewitching and cute".

== Track listings ==
"Oishii Kisetsu/Ketteiteki Sanpunkan" Type A track list
No.	Title	Writer(s)	Arrangement	Length
1.	"Oishii Kisetsu"	Ringo Sheena	R. Sheena	4:14
2.	"Ketteiteki Sanpunkan"	R. Sheena	R. Sheena	3:00
3.	"Cat's Eye"	Yoshiko Miura, Yuichiro Oda	Ryo Eguchi	2:58
Total length:				10:12

"Ketteiteki Sanpunkan/Oishii Kisetsu" Type B track list
No.	Title	Writer(s)	Arrangement	Length
1.	"Ketteiteki Sanpunkan"	R. Sheena	R. Sheena	3:00
2.	"Oishii Kisetsu"	R. Sheena	R. Sheena	4:14
3.	"Cat's Eye"	Y. Miura, Y. Oda	R. Eguchi	2:58
Total length:				10:12

== Charts and sales ==
Chart (2011)	Peak position
Japan Billboard Japan Hot 100	100
Japan Oricon weekly singles: "Oishii Kisetsu/Ketteiteki Sanpunkan"	37

=== Sales and certifications ===
Chart	Amount
Oricon physical sales: "Oishii Kisetsu/Ketteiteki Sanpunkan"	4,000

== Release history ==
Region	Date	Format	Distributing Label	Catalogue codes
Japan	February 16, 2011	Ringtone	Defstar Records	
Japan	March 2, 2011	CD, digital download	Defstar Records	DFCL-1759, DFCL-1760
Japan	March 19, 2011	Rental CD	Defstar Records	DFCL-1759, DFCL-1760
