= Honjitsu wa Taian Nari =

Japanese television series

- Genre: Suspense, comedy, romance
- Starring: Yūka; Yuko Asano; Ken Ishiguro; Tomoka Kurokawa; Mitsuki Tanimura; Mari Hoshino; Naoki Tanaka; Yoshinori Okada; Miho Shiraishi; Seishiro Kato; Yasuo Daichi
- Country of origin: Japan
- Original language: Japanese
- No. of episodes: 10

Production
- Running time: 29 minutes

Original release
- Network: NHK
- Release: 10 January – 13 March 2012

Honjitsu wa Taian Nari (本日は大安なり) is a Japanese television drama series based on a novel by Mizuki Tsujimura. It premiered on NHK on January 10, 2012, with Yūka in the lead role.

== Cast ==
- Yūka as Takako Yamai
- Yuko Asano as Kaoruko Sugiura
- Ken Ishiguro as Tsuyoshi Yamamoto
- Tomoka Kurokawa as Narumi Asahi
- Mitsuki Tanimura as Himika Kagayama/Marika Kagayama
- Mari Hoshino as Reina Ōsaki
- Naoki Tanaka as Junichi Tokura
- Yoshinori Okada as Rikuo Suzuki
- Miho Shiraishi as Kiwako Suzuki
- Seishiro Kato as Masora Shirasu
- Yasuo Daichi as Junichirō Iwakura
- Mai Oshima as Asuka Mita
