= The Aosawa Murders =

2005 novel written by Riku Onda

- Author: Riku Onda
- Original title: Eugenia
- Translator: Alison Watts
- Cover artist: Eleanor Rose
- Language: Japanese
- Genre: Mystery, Fiction, Thriller, Detective Fiction
- Publisher: Kadokawa Corporation, Bitter Lemon Press (English Version)
- Publication date: February 2, 2005
- Publication place: Japan
- English publication date: February 18, 2020
- Media type: Print (Paperback)
- Pages: 315
- ISBN: 978-1-912242-245

The Aosawa Murders is the first crime novel written by Riku Onda and was published in Japan in 2005. Bitter Lemon Press later published an English translation in 2020.

The novel focuses on a 1973 mass poisoning case set in seaside city K—. At a birthday celebration for the influential Aosawa family, seventeen people died from poisoning after drinking sake and soft drinks.

Onda's writing style is classified as shin honkaku, a "new orthodox" form of Japanese detective fiction, and is structured to focus on three converging timelines.

Onda drew inspiration for the novel after listening to Michel Petrucciani's song Eugenia. It also references the Teigin Incident, a real case of mass cyanide poisoning in Japan that occurred in 1948.

The reception of the novel was well received, landing on top 100 notable books of 2020 by The New York Times. She won the Best Novel for Mystery Writers of Japan Award in 2006.

== Summary ==
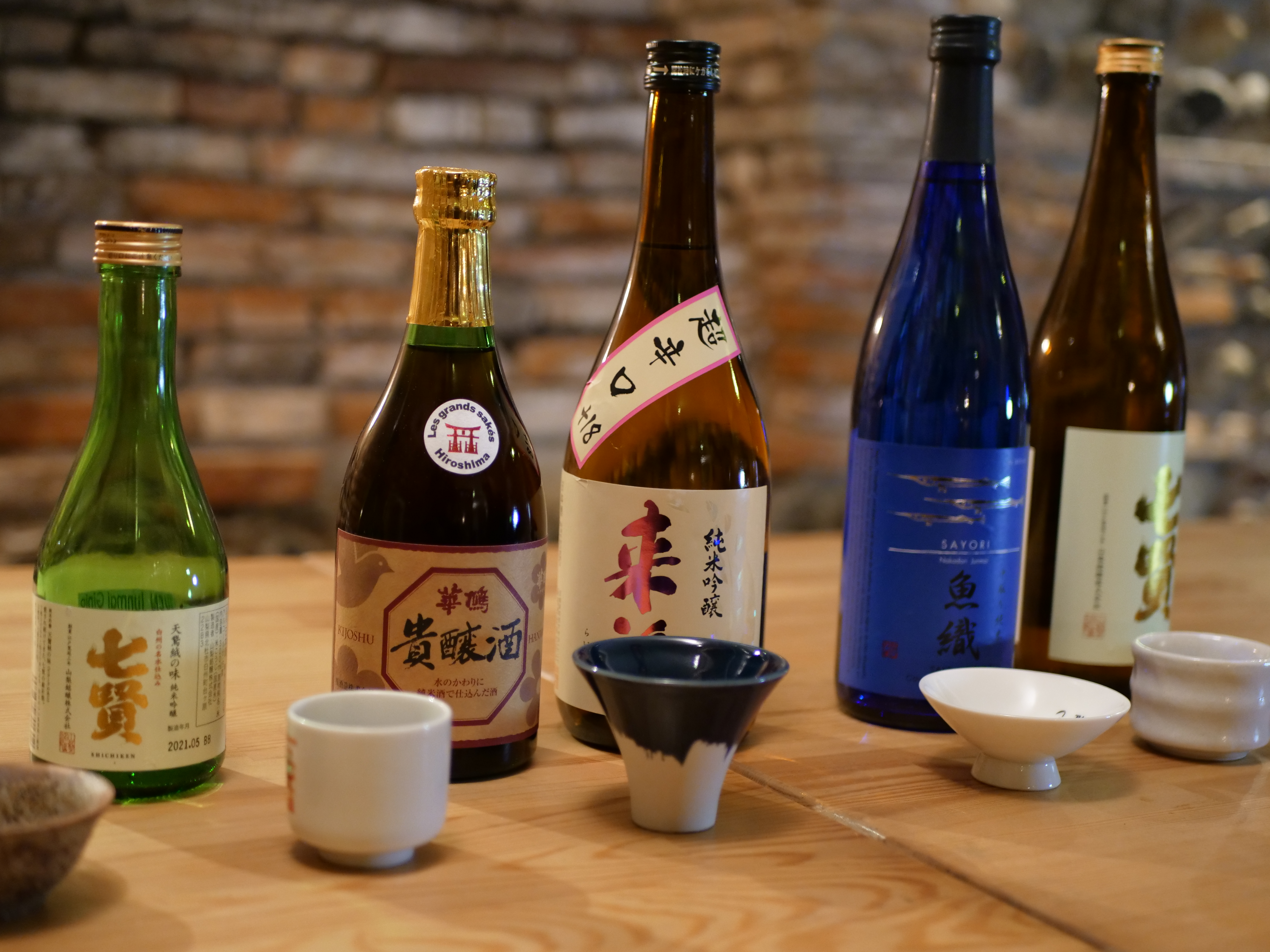
Japanese Sake- used in the mass poisoning at the Aosawa house

The Aosawa family is a prominent family within the city of K–. As they celebrate a multi-generational birthday party, that admiration is sullied when an unnamed man presents the attendants with sake and soft drinks as a gift. This resulted in the death of 17 people: family and friends who had gathered for the party. The Aosawa housekeeper miraculously survives, but the survivor that everyone focuses on is Hisako Aosawa, the beautiful, blind daughter and only survivor from the Aosawa family. Makiko Saiga, one of her admirers, discovers the crime along with her older brothers. Makiko, being so affected by the mass poisoning, wrote the novel The Forgotten Festival which was inspired by the event.

An unnamed narrator interviews Makiko about her thoughts on the murders. Makiko reveals that her novel started off as a university thesis but then got picked up by a publisher. She explains that she wanted to figure out something by publishing the book, but after its release, she lost interest in it. At the end of the interview, the narrator asks her about the real culprit. Makiko comments that the answer is easy–when all but one die in a household, it is the survivor.

In an interview with Makiko's assistant, he reveals how dedicated Makiko was to the project, but also how odd she acted doing research. In her interviews, she unknowingly changed personas depending on who she was talking to. This oddity is magnified by her fixation on Hisako herself. An excerpt from Makiko's novel makes this obsession apparent. Hisako's character asks Makiko’s character not to come to her house on the day of the birthday party. Describing Hisako in detail, Saiga creates a picture of Hisako as "seeing" the world differently due to being blind. In an interview with the housekeeper’s daughter, she recounts that she once saw Hisako swinging with a big, eerie smile, unnerving her. In a change of interviewees, the detective recounts his experience. He is also suspicious of Hisako and knew at first glance that she was guilty of the murders. The narrative is altered again with the interview of Sei-ichi, Makiko Saiga's eldest brother. In an off-beat manner, he asserts that the Aosawas had it coming due to their fame.

In another interview, a young master talks of a man who turns out to be the nameless man that delivered the poisoned drinks to the Aosawas. Ultimately, he was arrested and charged. However, the young master is not convinced of this outcome. The young man was private and interested in Buddhism, particularly the third eye, a concept of seeing past the ordinary world. In a perspective change, the unnamed narrator interviews someone who was a kid at the time of the murders and was friendly with the young man to the point of calling him "Big Brother". He admits Big Brother was troubled, and oftentimes heard a voice he described as a white flower. He does not believe that Big Brother committed the act alone. Many clues are left unsolved, and the people of K— think the case was closed with an insufficient resolution. A poem called "Eugenia" was left by the perpetrator, but no one can decipher its meaning. The man called Big Brother delivered the drink but had no motive to kill, and Hisako Aosawa witnessed the entirety of the poisoning but cannot give any tangible details. Decades later there is still a search for the truth among long-held beliefs and the sour feelings of the people living in the seaside city of K—.

== Literary elements ==
=== Structure ===
Riku Onda creates complexity with three converging storylines, thus creating the effect of a story within a story. The original events of the day that the Aosawa tragedy occurred, descriptions of the interviews and writings of Makiko Saiga’s novel a decade later, and the present-day interviews, over 30 years later, that read like one-sided transcripts. In the present, the interviews are without dialogue or the prompts from the interviewer, solely the responses of the interviewee are recorded. These interviews are told in multiperspectivity, a technique showing differing experiences of the same events. These narrated chapters intermingle with other media, such as: an excerpt from Saiga's novel The Forgotten Festival, "Scenes from a Life" a chapter including snippets of events, diary entries, and newspaper articles. Onda uses a framing device, a significant element to ground the story at the beginning or end of a work, in the form of a poem called Eugenia, a reference to the Japanese publication title.

=== Genre ===
The Aosawa Murders can be classified as shin honkaku or "new orthodox" and is derived from the popular honkaku genre. Honkaku which translates to "orthodox" refers to complex mysteries that can be logically solved. Albeit mostly similar, shin honkaku has looser genre boundaries and can include less formal literary devices.

== Background ==
=== Inspiration ===
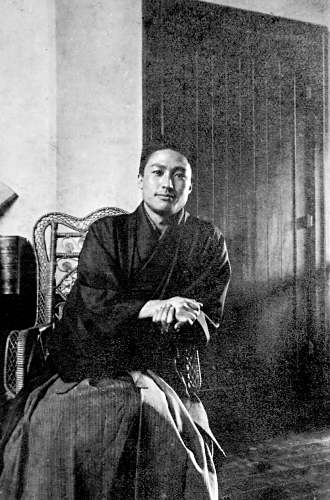
Sadamichi Hirasawa- Arrested for The Tiegen Incident

Riku Onda had aspirations of becoming a writer since a young age. She began her writing career in her early twenties, quitting her job to become a novelist. The justification for her decision came from Ken'ichi Sakemi who made his successful debut as a writer at age 25, only a year older than Onda. Drawing inspiration from Michel Petrucciani's song "Eugenia," Onda wrote a poem by the same name which helps frame the story of life and death seen in The Aosawa Murders. Her novel is set in the Hokuriku region where she lived as a child.

=== Teigin Incident ===
The mass poisoning case in The Aosawa Murders references a crime that was committed in Japan known as the Teigin Incident. On January 26, 1948, twelve people died after a man disguised as a public health official entered a bank and urged the employees to ingest an immunization for the recent dysentery outbreak. The concoction turned out to be poison, and Sadamichi Hirasawa was arrested for mass homicide. The trial was prolonged as views about the evidence were largely divided. Hirasawa was eventually sentenced to execution by hanging though he pursued exoneration for 40 years before he died in prison at age 95. The Teigin Incident is remembered as one of Japan's most compelling mass murder cases. Decades later, paintings he created while on death row are showcased at a Tokyo gallery.

== Reception ==
=== Awards ===
Riku Onda was presented with the Mystery Writers of Japan Award for Best Novel in 2006, as the 59th recipient. The award honors the best crime fiction of the previous year.

The Aosawa Murders was named one of the "100 Notable Books of 2020" by The New York Times Book Review, selecting notable works of literature.

=== Literature and translation ===
Jennifer Reese in The New York Times "What to Read" shortlist published February 20, 2020 praises Riku Onda for her engrossing, complex story. As Onda's first book to be published in English, Alison Watts delivers an accomplished translation. The story's non-linear approach to piecing together multiple perspectives creates a synaptic experience for the reader. Onda does not follow the rules of a traditional mystery novel. She conjures a world that is both separate but connected, leading the reader to connect remnants of the past and present.

Tara Cheesman in the Los Angeles Review of Books of March 25, 2020 tells of Onda's work as a locked-room puzzle, interwoven with a one-sided interview style and a nonlinear plot-line. Compared to a spigot left open, the unending flow of information to propel the plot is commended. Alison Watt's translation is also applauded, for her ability to hold the complicated form, and the puzzle of the prose itself. A masterful translation that keeps purposeful underdevelopment intact.

Jill Dobson in The Japan Society review summarizes Onda's intended effect of the novel: the revelation of a crime is oftentimes messy, and the story itself meanders. Simply finding the culprit is never the complete story.

Terry Hong in Smithsonian BookDragon (January 2020) compliments Onda's unique style of clues that address both the motive and perpetrator of a crime, engaging readers in a hunt for the truth.

Matthew Amster-Burton (February 2021) in the International Examiner describes Onda's work as delightfully evoking imagination while describing a rich setting. Onda brings into play themes of memory, and a reader favorite, used bookstores.

Kirkus Reviews (February 2020) praises Onda's work as crossing barriers between other works, and consistently perplexing the reader with wild turns and "dark and dazzling" atmosphere.
