= My Little Nightmare =

- poster
- Genre: Science fiction, Fantasy, School Life
- Written by: Sumio Omori
- Directed by: Noriyoshi Sakuma, Ryuichi Inomata, Shintaro Sugawara
- Starring: Keiko Kitagawa, Manatsu Kimura
- Theme music composer: Hotei Tomoyasu
- Opening theme: Saraba, Itoshiki Kanashimitachi yo
- Composer: Masaru Yokoyama
- Country of origin: Japan
- Original language: Japanese
- No. of seasons: 1

Production
- Executive producer: Futoshi Ohira
- Producers: Kazuya Toda, Yukitoshi Chiba, Eiji Otsuka
- Running time: 54 minutes
- Production company: Nippon Television

Original release
- Network: Nippon Television
- Release: October 13 – December 22, 2012

My Little Nightmare (悪夢ちゃん, Akumu-chan) is a 2012 Japanese television drama series. Based on the novel Yumechigai by Riku Onda, this television series stars actress Keiko Kitagawa, singer Gackt, and also child actress Manatsu Kimura. A movie was announced for 2014.

This television series was broadcast in Japan from October 13, 2012, to December 22, 2012, as part of Nippon Television's Saturday Dramas time slot, which airs every Saturday from 9 pm to 9:54 pm. In addition, it was simulcast on the streaming service Crunchyroll in the U.S., Canada, United Kingdom, Ireland, South Africa, Australia, and New Zealand.

== Plot ==
Ayami is a beautiful and intelligent teacher who is popular with both her students and colleagues alike. However, she has a darker side- she does not genuinely feel for others nor does she believe in love or trust. One day, however, Yuiko, a girl whose dreams are able to predict terrible events of the future, transfers into Ayami's class after dreaming that Ayami is a saviour of the world. Ayami reluctantly gets dragged into helping Yuiko change the terrible fate of the people around them.

== Cast ==
- Keiko Kitagawa as Ayami Mutoi

Child actress Hirasawa Kokoro plays the role of young Ayami.

- Manatsu Kimura as Yuiko Koto
- Yūka as Hirashima Kotoha
- Fumiyo Kohinata as Bannosuke Koto
- Gackt as Takashi Shiki/Yumeoji
- Masato Wada as Mineki Yamasato

=== Teachers ===
- Mari Hamada as Satoko Kaibara
- Keisuke Okada as Yuichi Mugiyama
- Yosuke Kawamura as Katsuyuki Inamoto
- Kenji Anan as Shinya Nakagomi
- Midoriko Kimura as Tatsuko Amasawa

== Production ==
My Little Nightmare was announced on August 17, 2012. It was announced that actress Keiko Kitagawa would star as the main lead of this drama series, making this her first role as a teacher. Child actress Manatsu Kimura was selected from a group of more than 500 hopefuls who auditioned for this drama series.

== Episodes ==
	Episode title	Romanized title	Translation of title	Broadcast date	Ratings
Ep. 1	教室襲う赤いワニ!!予知夢の謎解きで腹黒教師が世界を救う!?	Kyōshitsu osou akai wani!! Yochi yume no nazotoki de haraguro kyōshi ga sekai o sukuu!?	A red crocodile is attacking the classroom!! A black-hearted teacher solves the mystery of the dream prediction and saves the world!?	October 13, 2012	13.6%
Ep. 2	姉弟の絆裂く悪魔!夢で救え!涙の教室	Kyōdai no kizuna saku akuma! Yume de sukue! Namida no kyōshitsu	The devil who tore apart the bond between brother and sister! Saved by a dream! A whole classroom in tears	October 20, 2012	10.7%
Ep. 3	学校狙う透明人間!?腹黒教師が衝撃変身	Gakkō nerau tōmei ningen!? Haraguro kyōshi ga shōgeki henshin	An invisible man targeting the school!? The transformation of the black-hearted teacher	October 27, 2012	12.9%
Ep. 4	笑顔やめます。生徒達の反撃!混乱学級	Egao yamemasu. Seito-tachi no hangeki! Konran gakkyū	I quit smiling. The counterattack of students. Pandemonium in the classroom.	November 3, 2012	10.4%
Ep. 5	鈴木福VS腹黒教師!夢食うゾンビの復讐	Suzuki Fuku VS haraguro kyōshi! Yume kuu zonbi no fukushū	Fuku Suzuki VS the black-hearted teacher! The revenge of the dream-eating zombies	November 10, 2012	12.8%
Ep. 6	私は…人殺し!?彩未遂に甦る衝撃の記憶	Watashi wa… hitogoroshi! ? Ayami ni yomigaeru shōgeki no kioku	I am a ... murderer!? Ayami finally recalls a shocking memory	November 17, 2012	11.5%
Ep. 7	ドラキュラの呪い!?学校やめる腹黒教師	Dorakyura no noroi! ? Gakkō yameru haraguro kyōshi	The curse of Dracula!? The black-hearted teacher quits the school	November 24, 2012	11.5%
Ep. 8	魔女ト未来少女ハルカゼ反逆ノつぶやきデ夢破壊	Majo to mirai shōjo harukaze hangyaku no tsubuyaki de yume hakai	The girl with magical powers from the future destroys dreams	December 1, 2012	11.5%
Ep. 9	仮面のヒーローと邪悪な人魚謎と呪いの神隠し!	Kamen no hīrō to jaakuna ningyo nazo to noroi no kamigakushi!	The curse of the masked rider and the mysterious mermaid spirit away!	December 8, 2012	10.4%
Ep. 10	仮面のヒーローと邪悪な人魚謎と呪いの神隠し!	Yochi yume ga genjitsu ni! Anata wa aisuruhito o korosemasu ka?	The dream comes true! Did you kill a loved one?	December 15, 2012	9.8%
Ep. 11	私達の未来を切り拓け!涙と希望のカーニバル	Watashitachi no mirai o kiri hirake! Namida to kibō no kānibaru	Let us open up the future together! The carnival of hope and tears	December 22, 2012	11.2%
Ratings for Kanto region (average rating: 11.53%)

== Theme song ==
The theme song for My Little Nightmare is "Saraba, Itoshiki Kanashimitachi yo" (サラバ、愛しき悲しみたちよ "Farewell, My Dear Sorrows") by Momoiro Clover Z. This song is the title track for this idol group's 9th single, and it was released in Japan on 21 November 2012. This single was produced by Tomoyasu Hotei.

Preceded by Ghost Mama Sousasen (7/7/2012 - 15/9/2012)	NTV Saturday Dramas 土曜ドラマ; Saturdays 21:00 - 21:54 (JST)	Succeeded by Nakuna, Hara-chan (January 2013 - March 2013)
