= Tsukiyo no Shōzō =

Single by Chiaki Kuriyama

from the album Circus Deluxe Edition
- B-side: "Seishun no Matataki"
- Released: November 23, 2011
- Recorded: 2011
- Genre: Pop-rock; Rock
- Length: 3:49
- Label: Defstar Records
- Songwriter: Ringo Sheena

Chiaki Kuriyama singles chronology
"Oishii Kisetsu" (2011)	"Tsukiyo no Shōzō" (2011)	"Toyosu Luciferin" (2013)

"Tsukiyo no Shōzō" (月夜の肖像; "Portrait of the Moonlit Night") (also known by its French title "Identité de la Lune") is Japanese entertainer Chiaki Kuriyama's fifth single, released on November 23, 2011. It acted as the theme song to Himitsu Chōhōin Erika, Kuriyama's first starring drama. The two songs on the single were added to the deluxe edition of Circus, which was released on January 11, 2012. The single was produced by musician Ringo Sheena, who later covered the B-side "Seishun no Matataki" for her album Gyakuyunyū: Kōwankyoku in 2014.

== Background and development ==
After Chiaki Kuriyama debuted in early 2010 with the single "Ryūsei no Namida," she began to release collaboration singles, featuring a famous Japanese rock musician as the producer. "Kanōsei Girl" (2010) was produced by Tomoyasu Hotei, and "Cold Finger Girl" (2011) by Kenichi Asai of Blankey Jet City. In March 2011, Kuriyama released "Oishii Kisetsu/Ketteiteki Sanpunkan," a double A-side single where both songs were produced by Ringo Sheena and performed by Tokyo Jihen. This was followed two weeks later by Circus, Kuriyama's debut album.

== Writing and production ==
"Tsukiyo no Shōzō" was recorded is sessions after the release of her debut album Circus, during which Kuriyama felt more confident as a singer. The songs were recorded with Sheena in the studio, with her band Tokyo Jihen performing the band instruments, with "Tsukiyo no Shōzō" recorded first, followed by "Seishun no Kagayaki." Long-time Sheena collaborator Neko Saito arranged the classical instruments.

Kuriyama felt that "Tsukiyo no Shōzō" was a song that blended "a woman's coolness and femininity" that did not emphasise sweetness or strength. Kuriyama felt that Sheena wrote "Tsukiyo no Shōzō" closer to Kuriyama's personality, after spending time together in recording sessions. She also believed it had a "strong image of women," and reflected the feelings of the character of Erika from the drama, who was a solo mother. Kuriyama felt that adding "Tsukiyo no Shōzō" and "Seishun no Matataki" to Circus gave the album more balance.

The songs were both given French titles by Sheena. "Tsukiyo no Shōzō" became "Identité de la Lune" (translated as "Identity of the Moon") and "Seishun no Matataki" became "Le moment" (translated as "The Moment").

== Promotion and release ==
The song was used as the theme song for the drama Himitsu Chōhōin Erika. The drama starred Kuriyama as the eponymous Erika Tahakashi, and was the first time Kuriyama was the leading actress in a drama.

A series of mini-lives were held in Japan to promote the release. The first two were in Tokyo on November 24 and 26, one in Osaka on November 27 and one in Nagoya on November 28. This was after her in-store lives to promote Circus were cancelled, due to the effects of the 2011 Tōhoku earthquake and tsunami. Kuriyama appeared on the Tokyo FM radio show School of Lock! on November 23, 2011. She also appeared on the Nippon TV show Hiru Nan Desu and the Space Shower show Specha! on November 24.

A music video was produced for "Tsukiyo no Shōzō," directed by Takumi Shiga and Yuichi Kodama. Kodama is Sheena's current partner, and is the father of her daughter who was born in 2013. Kodama frequently worked on Sheena's videos, directing all of Tokyo Jihen's music videos for singles single "OSCA" in 2007. He also worked on Sheena's solo singles "Ariamaru Tomi" (2009), "Carnation" (2011).

Ringo Sheena performed "Tsukiyo no Shōzō" during her solo Tōtaikai concerts in November 2013.

== Critical reception ==
Kazuhiro "Scao" Ikeda of EMTG called the song "impressive", and noted that it had a "running-like sound on top of a thrilling, restless melody". He praised Kuriyama's "comfortable and cold vocals"that shone in the song, and noted the symmetry of the song's lyrics: how two sets of different words were able to express the same ideas.

== Track listings ==
All tracks are written by Ringo Sheena.

No.	Title	Arrangement	Length
1.	"Tsukiyo no Shōzō"	Tokyo Jihen	3:49
2.	"Seishun no Matataki" (青春の瞬き "A Blink of Youth")	Tokyo Jihen	4:30
Total length:			8:19

== Charts and sales ==
Chart (2011)	Peak position
Japan Billboard Hot Single Sales	61
Japan Oricon weekly singles	62

=== Sales and certifications ===
Chart	Amount
Oricon physical sales	2,000

== Release history ==
Region	Date	Format	Distributing Label	Catalogue codes
Japan	November 23, 2011	CD, digital download, Rental CD	Defstar Records	DFCL-1814
