= Chiaki Kuriyama =

Japanese actress, singer, and model (born 1984)

- 栗山 千明
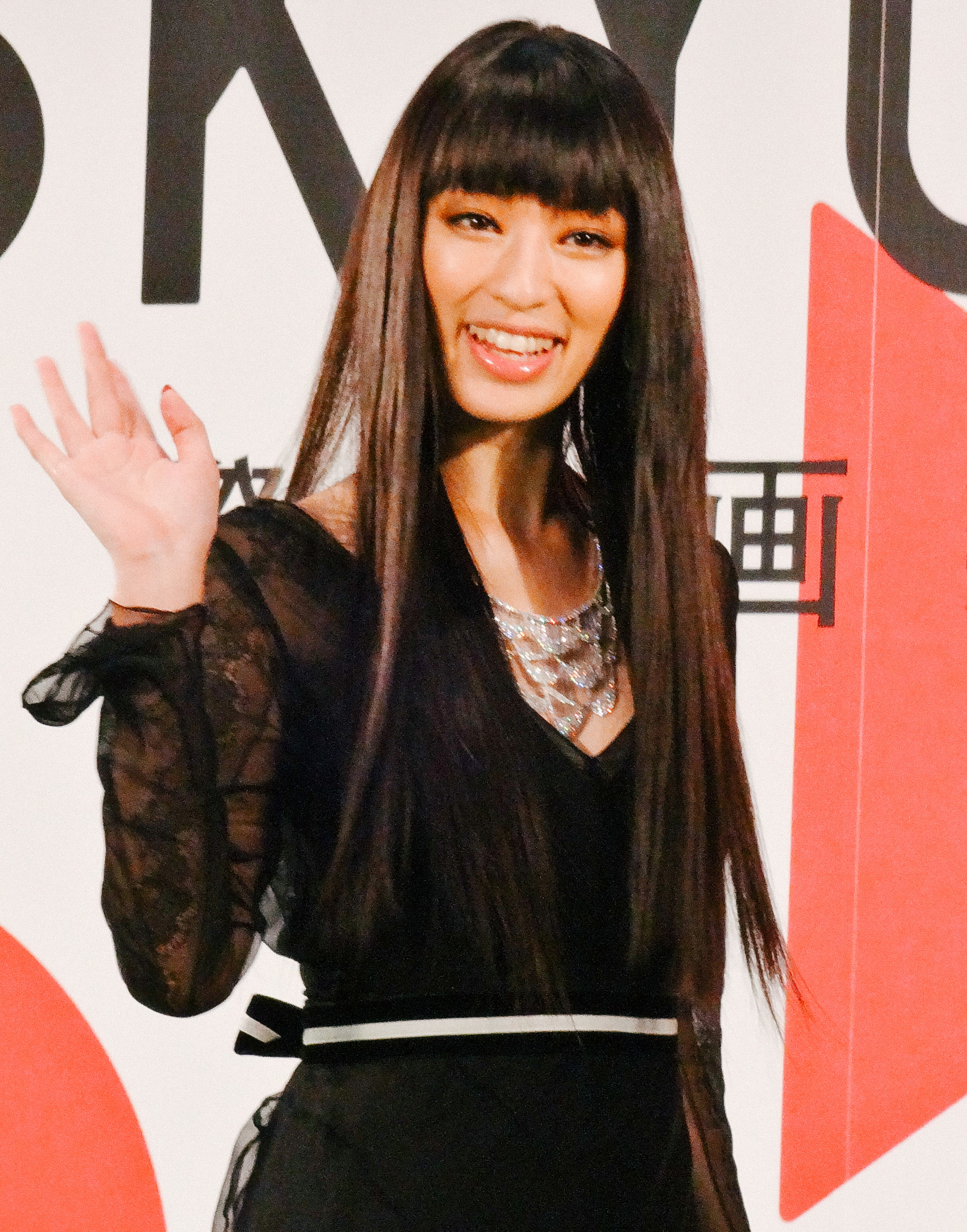
- Kuriyama at the 26th Tokyo International Film Festival (2014)
- Born: October 10, 1984 (age 42); Tsuchiura, Ibaraki, Japan
- Occupations: Actress, model, singer
- Years active: 1995–present
- Height: 1.62 m (5 ft 4 in)
- Website: chiakikuriyama.com

Chiaki Kuriyama (栗山 千明, Kuriyama Chiaki; born October 10, 1984) is a Japanese actress, singer, and model. She used to be a (nude) child model before her acting career took off. She played Takako Chigusa in Kinji Fukasaku's 2000 film Battle Royale, Gogo Yubari in Quentin Tarantino's 2003 film Kill Bill: Volume 1, and Yuko Mizushima in Sion Sono's 2007 film Exte.

== Early life ==
She was born in Tsuchiura, Ibaraki. Kuriyama was a popular model during Japan's child model boom in the mid-1990s. In 1997, she appeared in the photobooks Shinwa-Shōjo (Girl of Myth) and Shōjokan (Girl's Residence), photographed by Kishin Shinoyama. Shinwa-Shōjo became a best-seller but, as it contained some nudity, was discontinued by the publisher in 1999 after the institution of new anti-child pornography laws. The book contains photos of the 13 year old Kuriyama in see-through clothing, topless and fully nude, although full nudity is photographically obscured by water. She also posed as a model for the child fashion magazines Nicola (1997–2001) and Pichi Lemon (1996–2001).

== Career ==
Before her movie career took off, Kuriyama was repeatedly featured in Kishin Shinoyama's photobooks as a child model. These works featured sensual photography and imagery of her in underwear. At the age of 13, she appeared topless and nude in Shinoayama's publication Shinwa-Shōjo.

She later had starring roles in the horror films Shikoku (1999) and Ju-on (2000). Chiaki also appeared in the 2000 action film Battle Royale as Takako Chigusa.

Following feature appearances on several Japanese television programs (including Rokubanme no Sayoko), Kuriyama made her Hollywood debut in director Quentin Tarantino's 2003 film Kill Bill: Volume 1 as Gogo Yubari, the schoolgirl bodyguard of yakuza boss O-Ren Ishii (Lucy Liu). Kuriyama's other film appearances include major roles in the ninja drama Azumi 2: Death or Love and Takashi Miike's Yōkai Daisensō.

In 2010, she released the CD single "Ryūsei no Namida" on DefStar Records under the artist name "CHiAKi KURiYAMA". The song was used as the first ending theme for Mobile Suit Gundam Unicorn. This single was followed by three others under her name as traditionally written in Japanese: "Kanōsei Girl", "Cold Finger Girl", and "Oishii Kisetsu" / "Ketteiteki Sanpunkan"; "Kanōsei Girl" was used as the third opening theme for Yorinuki Gin Tama-san and "Cold Finger Girl" was used as the opening for the anime adaptation of Level E. She followed the singles with an album, Circus, in 2011.

== Filmography ==
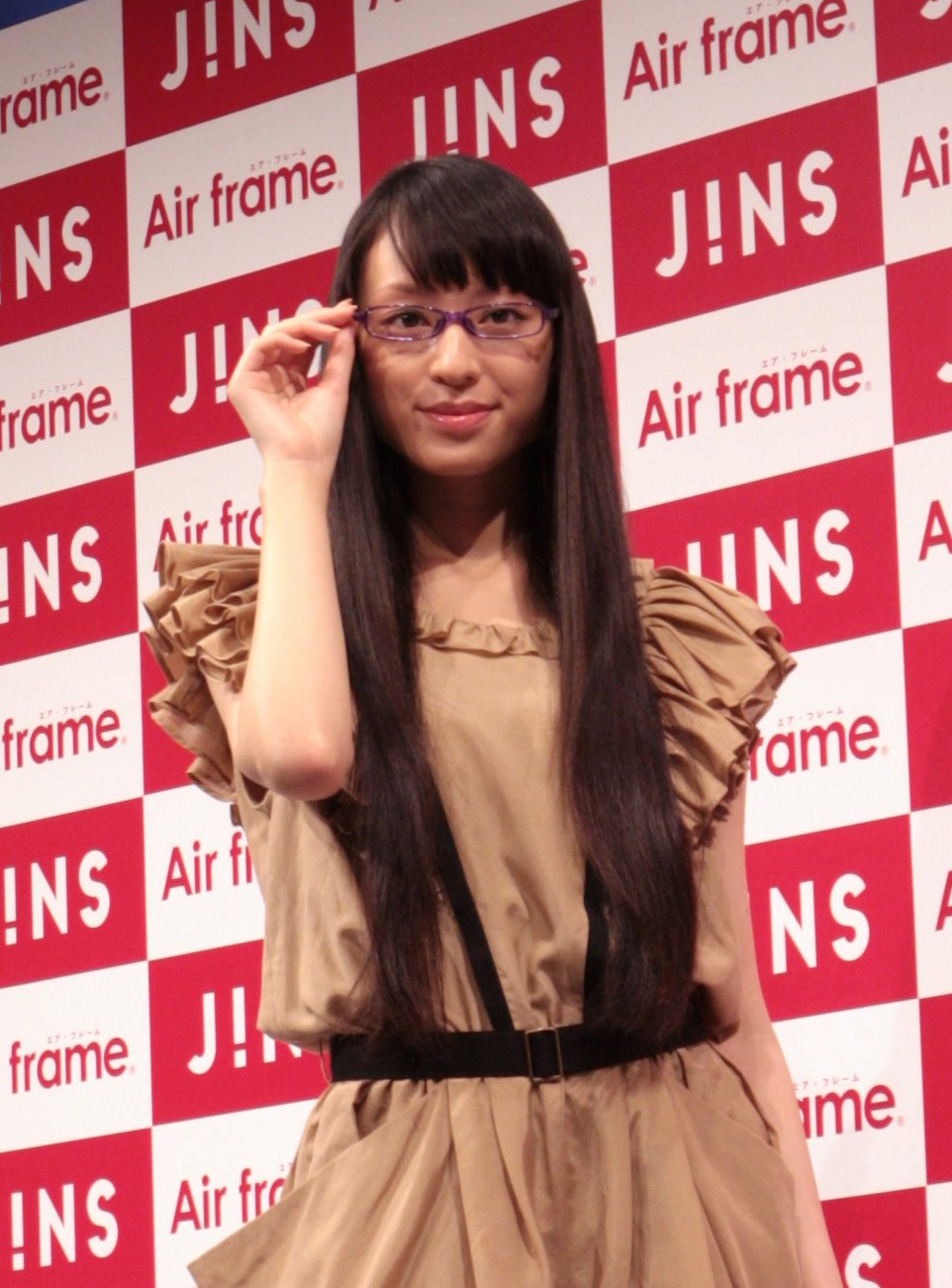
Kuriyama at an event in 2010

=== Film ===
| Year | Title | Role | Notes |
|---|---|---|---|
| 1995 | Toire no Hanako-san | Little Child | |
| 1995 | Gonin | Ogiwara's daughter | |
| 1999 | Shikoku | Sayori Hiura | |
| 2000 | Kamen Gakuen | Reika Dojima | |
| 2000 | Ju-on: The Curse | Mizuho Tamura | |
| 2000 | Battle Royale | Takako Chigusa - Girl #13 | |
| 2003 | Kill Bill: Volume 1 | Gogo Yubari | |
| 2003 | Itsuka 'A' Torein ni Notte | Yuki Noguchi | |
| 2004 | Last Quarter | Mizuki Mochizuki | |
| 2004 | Kill Bill: The Whole Bloody Affair | Gogo Yubari | |
| 2005 | Mail | Mikoto | |
| 2005 | Azumi 2: Death or Love | Kozue | |
| 2005 | Into the Sun | Ayako | |
| 2005 | The Great Yokai War | Agi | |
| 2005 | Scrap Heaven | Saki Fujimura | |
| 2006 | Kisarazu Cats Eye: World Series | Ayako Sugimoto | |
| 2007 | Exte (エクステ, Ekusute) | Yuko Mizushima | |
| 2007 | Tengu Gaiden | Amaya | |
| 2008 | Kids | Shiho | |
| 2008 | GS Wonderland | Miku Ono | |
| 2008 | Komori Seikatsu Kojo Club | Shizue | |
| 2009 | Kamogawa Horumo | Fumi Kusunoki | |
| 2009 | Hagetaka: The Movie | Yuka Mishima | |
| 2010 | Neck | Eiko Akasaka | |
| 2012 | Ghostwriter Hotel | Naoko Utsumi | |
| 2012 | SPEC: Ten | Satoko Aoike | |
| 2013 | Toshokan Sensō | Asako Shibasaki | |
| 2013 | SPEC: Close: Incarnation | Satoko Aoike | |
| 2013 | SPEC: Close: Reincarnation | Satoko Aoike | |
| 2013 | Ataru the First Love & the Last Kill | Maiko Ebina | |
| 2014 | Team Batista Final: Kerberos no Shōzō | Sumire Sakuranomiya | |
| 2015 | Library Wars: The Last Mission | Asako Shibasaki | |
| 2015 | A Sower of Seeds 2 | Keiko Kanno | |
| 2016 | The Top Secret: Murder in Mind | Yukiko Miyoshi | |
| 2017 | Blade of the Immortal | Hyakurin | |
| 2019 | Chiwawa | Yūko | |
| 2021 | A Sower of Seeds 4 | Keiko Jinno | |
| 2022 | Fullmetal Alchemist: The Final Alchemy | Olivier Mira Armstrong | |
| 2024 | Hakkenden: Fiction and Reality | Tamazusa | |

=== Television ===
| Year | Title | Role | Notes |
|---|---|---|---|
| 1998 | Nacchan Ka | | |
| 1999 | Kowai Dowa - Oyayubihime | Sayako | |
| 2000 | Ju-on: The Curse | Mizuho Tamamura | |
| 2000 | Rokubanme no Sayoko | Sayoko Tsumura | |
| 2000 | MPD Psycho | Mao Tōju | |
| 2000 | Himitsu Kurabu o-daiba.com | Kazumi Naruse | |
| 2000 | Kabushiki Kaisha o-daiba.com | Kazumi Naruse | |
| 2001 | R-17 | Saori Maruyama | |
| 2006 | Jyooubachi | Tomoko/Kotoe Daidoji | |
| 2006 | Woman's Island | Rei Fujishima | |
| 2006 | Haru, Barneys de | Sakurai Sae | |
| 2006 | Kakure Karakuri | Karin Hanayama | |
| 2007 | Hagetaka | Yuka Mishima | |
| 2007 | Tokkyu Tanaka 3 Go | Terumi Meguro | |
| 2008 | Ashita no Kita Yoshio | Rika Hasegawa | |
| 2008 | Loss Time Life | Ayaka Kurosaki | |
| 2008 | Sirius no Michi | Yuka Hirano | |
| 2010 | Atami no Sosakan | Sae Kitajima | |
| 2011 | Rebound | Hitomi Mimura | |
| 2011 | Tsukahara Bokuden | Mahiro | |
| 2011 | Himitsu Chohoin Erika | Erika Takahashi | |
| 2011–12 | Carnation | Natsu Yoshida | Asadora |
| 2012 | Ataru | Maiko Ebina | |
| 2012 | Jikken Keiji Totori | Makorin | |
| 2013 | Ataru Special: New York kara no Chōsenjō | Maiko Ebina | |
| 2013 | Haitatsu Saretai Watashitachi | Yu Okue | |
| 2013 | Kaibutsu | Emi Ishikawa | |
| 2013 | Jikken Keiji Totori 2 | Makorin | |
| 2013 | Shikeidai no 72 Jikan | Tōko Natsuki | |
| 2014 | Team Batista 4: Rasen Meikyū | Sumire Sakuranomiya | |
| 2014 | Alice no Toge | Miwa Hoshino | |
| 2014 | Satsujin Hensachi 70 | Sana Nishiura | |
| 2014 | Dr. Nâsu eido | Kotomi Hayashi | |
| 2014 | Time Taxi | Misora Shibayama | |
| 2015 | Algernon ni Hanataba wo | Haruka Mochizuki | |
| 2015 | Heat | Sakura Azumi | |
| 2016 | Nobunaga Moyu | Kajūji Haruko | |
| 2016 | Fukigen na Kajitsu | Mayako Mizukoshi | |
| 2016 | Copy Face | Nodoka Hirosawa, Fuyuko Asakura | |
| 2017–22 | CSI: Crime Scene Talks | Rio Kanzaki | |
| 2017 | Wedding Bells For The Otaku? | Haruko Fujita | Television film |
| 2020–21 | 24 Japan | Itsuki Mizuishi | |
| 2022–24 | Banshaku no Ryugi | Miyuki Izawa | |
| 2023 | Liaison: Kodomo no Kokoro Shinryosho | Kazuki Mukaiyama | |
| 2024 | Ōoku | Lady Matsushima | |
| 2024 | Hanasaki Mai ga Damattenai | Kyoka Nezu | |
| 2025 | Even Though We're Adults | Akari Hirayama | |
| 2026 | Zenigata Heiji | Tomoe | Television film |
| 2026 | Shadows of the Ten Ninja | Yodo-dono | |

=== Voice roles ===
| Year | Title | Role | Notes |
|---|---|---|---|
| 1999 | Eden's Bowy | Konyako Persia | |
| 2008 | The Sky Crawlers | Midori Mitsuya | |
| 2012 | Dragon Age: Dawn of the Seeker | Cassandra Pentaghast | |
| 2012 | The Expendables 2 | Maggie Chan | Voice dub for Yu Nan |
| 2013 | Star Trek Into Darkness | Uhura | Voice dub for Zoe Saldaña |
| 2017 | Pirates of the Caribbean: Dead Men Tell No Tales | Carina Smyth | Voice dub for Kaya Scodelario |

=== Video games ===
| Year | Title | Role | Notes |
|---|---|---|---|
| 2011 | Ryū ga Gotoku of the End | Misuzu Asagi | |
| 2011 | Shadows of the Damned | Paula | |
| 2020 | Death Come True | Akane Sachimura | |
| 2025 | Fortnite | Gogo Yubari | Likeness |

=== Stage ===
- Dogen's adventure (2008)
- Coast of Utopia (2009)
- Midnight in Bali (2017)

== Discography ==
=== Album ===
List of albums, with selected chart positions
| Title | Album details | Peak positions | Sales (JPN) |
| Title | Album details | JPN | Sales (JPN) |
|---|---|---|---|
| Circus | Released: March 16, 2011; Re-released: January 11, 2012; Label: Defstar Records; Formats: CD, CD/DVD, digital download | 19 | 12,000 |

=== Singles ===
List of singles, with selected chart positions
| Title | Year | Peak chart positions | | Sales (JPN) | Album |
| Title | Year | Oricon Singles Charts | Billboard Japan Hot 100 (Note: The Japan Hot 100 was established in February 2008.) (Note: Sources for chart positions are as follows: "Ryūsei no Namida", "Kanōsei Girl", "Cold Finger Girl", "Oishii Kisetsu".) | Sales (JPN) | Album |
|---|---|---|---|---|---|
| "Ryūsei no Namida" (流星のナミダ; "Meteor Tears") (Note: Under the name CHiAKi KURiYAMA.) | 2010 | 11 | 24 | 21,000 | Non-album single |
| "Kanōsei Girl" (可能性ガール, Kanōsei Gāru; "Possibility Girl") | 2010 | 30 | 41 | 8,000 | Circus |
| "Cold Finger Girl" (コールドフィンガーガール, Kōrudo Fingā Gāru) | 2011 | 39 | 88 | 5,000 | Circus |
| "Oishii Kisetsu" | 2011 | 37 | 100 | 4,000 | Circus |
| "Ketteiteki Sanpunkan" | 2011 | 37 | — | 4,000 | Circus |
| "Tsukiyo no Shōzō" | 2011 | 62 | — (Note: Charted at number 61 on the Billboard Hot Single Sales chart.) | 2,000 | Circus Deluxe Edition |
| "Toyosu Luciferin" (とよす☆ルシフェリン, Toyosu Rushiferin) | 2013 | 109 | — | 900 | Non-album single |
| "0" | 2013 | 111 | — | 500 | Non-album single |
| "Dilemma" | 2014 | — | — | | Non-album single |

== Photobooks ==
- Namaiki! Photo: Kishin Shinoyama.Text:Akio Nakamori. (ISBN 4-10-326205-2,1996)
- Tenshi/angel (天使) Photo: Mitsuo Kawamoto. (ISBN 4-09-680821-0,1996).
- Sinwa-Shoujo (神話少女）Photo: Kishin Shinoyama. Text:Akio Nakamori.(ISBN 4-10-326207-9,1997)
- Shoujokan (少女館)Photo: Kishin Shinoyama. (ISBN 4-10-326209-5,1997)
- Shikoku nite (死国にて)(ISBN 4-04-904318-1, 1999)
- Kuriyama Chiaki ACCESS BOOK (栗山千明ACCESS BOOK)(ISBN 4-04-853047-X, 1999)
- Princess (プリンセス 栗山千明×蜷川実花）Photo: Mika Ninagawa. (ISBN 4-06-352725-5, 2004)
- digi+KISHIN DVD:Chiaki Kuriyama. Image Film by Kishin Shinoyama. (ASIN B0001LNO7O, 2004)
- digi+Girls kishin NO.4 Kuriyama Chiaki (digi+Girls kishin NO.4 栗山 千明) Photo: Kishin Shinoyama. (ASIN: 4255002797, 2004)
- Car girl Photo: Kishin Shinoyama. (ISBN 4-584-17094-0, 2004)
- Emergence Uka (羽化) Photo: Chikashi Kasai. (ISBN 4-02-331332-7,2014)

== Awards and nominations ==
| Year | Award | Category | Nominated work | Result |
|---|---|---|---|---|
| 2004 | 2004 MTV Movie Awards | Best Fight | Kill Bill: Vol. 1 | Won |
| 2004 | 30th Saturn Awards | Cinescape Genre Face of the Future Award | Kill Bill: Vol. 1 | Nominated |
| 2009 | Fantastic Fest | Best Fantastic Actress | Kamogawa Horumo | Won |
