= Niigata Kenmin FM Broadcast =

Defunct radio station in Niigata, Japan

JOWV-FM
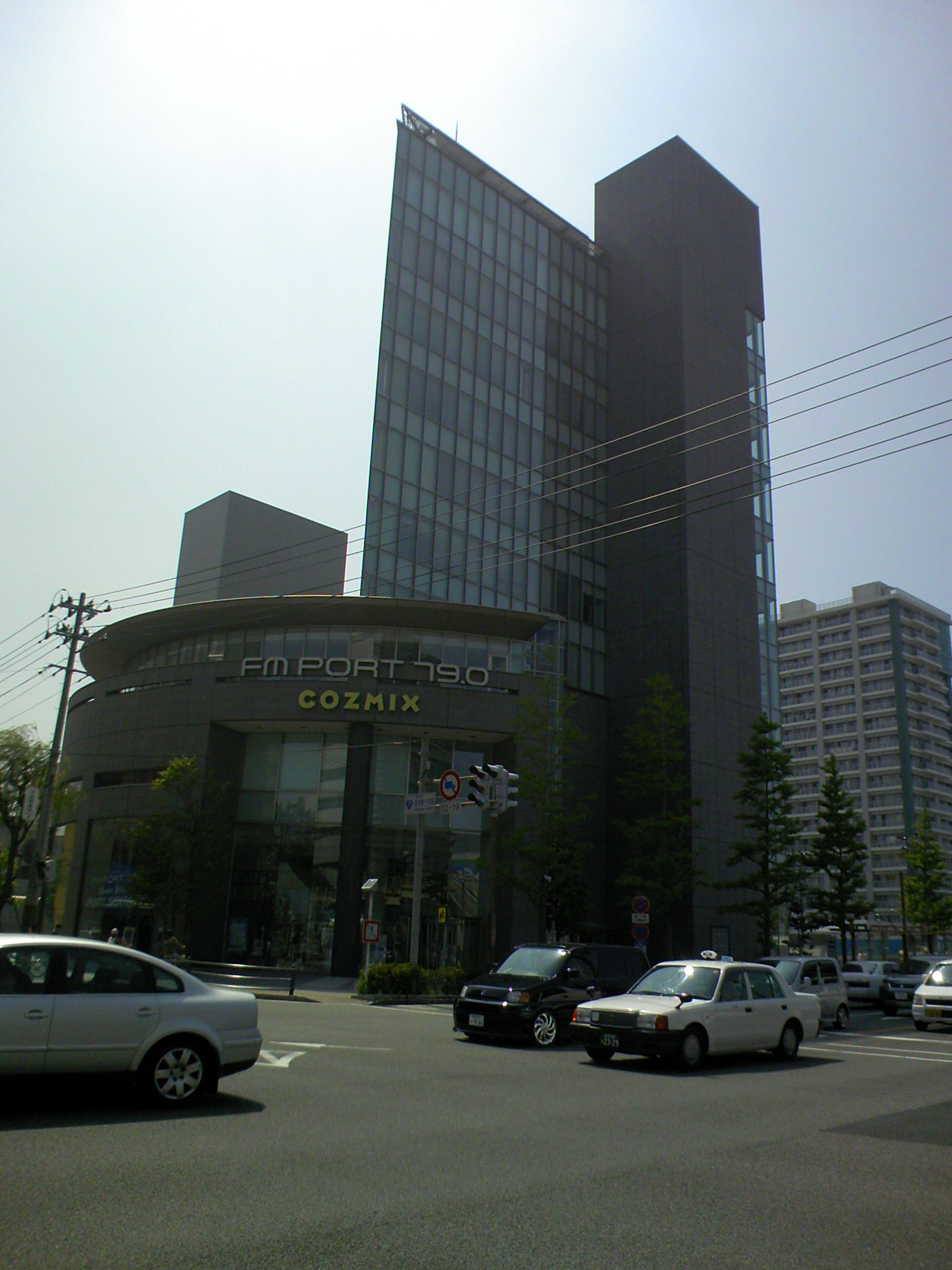
- FM Port studio in Niigata
- Niigata, Niigata; Japan
- Broadcast area: Niigata Prefecture, Japan
- Frequency: 79 MHz
- Branding: FM Port

Programming
- Language: Japanese
- Format: Defunct (was contemporary hit radio)
- Affiliations: Formerly on Japan FM League, now independent

Ownership
- Owner: Niigata Kenmin FM Broadcast Co., Ltd.

History
- First air date: December 20, 2000
- Last air date: June 30, 2020 (19 years, 6 months and 10 days)

Technical information
- Power: 1,000 watts
- Translators: Uonuma, Niigata: 87.9 MHz, Jōetsu, Niigata: 83.2 MHz

Links
- Webcast: Radiko - FMPORT
- Website: http://www.fmport.com/

Niigata Kenmin FM Broadcast Co., Ltd. (新潟県民エフエム放送株式会社, Niigata Kenmin Efu Emu Hōsō Kabushiki Gaisha; "Niigata Prefectural FM Broadcast Co., Ltd."; call sign JOWV-FM) was a Japanese FM radio station under the name FM Port (エフエムポート, Efu Emu Pōto). It was founded in 2000 and ceased operation in 2020.

On March 18, 2020, the board of directors of the station voted to close the station and announcing officially the station closing. On June 30, 2020 at 11:59 p.m. (JST), the station officially closed after almost 20 years on the air as well as removing itself from Radiko and on July 14, the bankruptcy proceedings started. The total debt is about 220 million yen (USD$2,078,952).

== Overview ==
At the time of its launch, it was the only station affiliated with the JAPAN FM LEAGUE outside the five major metropolitan areas, but it soon withdrew from the league and has since become an independent FM station that broadcasts only its own programs. It is also the only Niigata Prefecture broadcasting station that was part of the Heisei era, both on television and radio.

The headquarters of Niigata Toyota Motor Corporation used to be located in the Cosmix Building. PORT still has close ties with Toyota Motor Corporation dealers in Niigata Prefecture (excluding some of them, including the company that owns the land), and the Chuetsu Group, including the transportation companies Chuetsu Transportation and Chuetsu Transporting. The cars used by PORT for reporting and sales are Toyota vehicles or their affiliated Daihatsu and Hino vehicles, and until around October 2005, stickers and stickers bearing the PORT logo for the Niigata Chuetsu Earthquake Reconstruction Campaign, "Let's do our best! Niigata Chuetsu!", were affixed to vehicles belonging to the Chuetsu Group that belong to Niigata Prefecture. PORT also sponsors many programs for these companies, but all programs sponsored by Toyota dealers ended at the end of December 2005.

From 23:50 to 23:58 on June 30, 2020, FMPORT's DJs and reporters (some of whom appeared by phone), both former and current, made comments to the viewers, and a special edition was broadcast for the closing, bringing an end to the station's 19 years and 6 months as a broadcasting station. The only official website was "thankyou.html," which contained a notice of the closure, and it was no longer possible to view anything other than the top menu.

In addition, when Niigata FM closed its doors, the Niigata Nippo pointed out that a Sankei Shimbun reporter had quoted photos taken by the Niigata Nippo without permission in the Sankei Shimbun newspaper dated December 1, 2020, and on its website, Sankei News. Sankei Shimbun removed the photos from its paper and website, and placed the reporter on disciplinary leave for two months.

== Timeline ==
- October 29, 1999 - The Ministry of Posts and Telecommunications allocates 79.0 MHz to Niigata Prefecture.
- 2000
  - March 24 - Preliminary license issued.
  - Around November - Test radio wave transmission.
  - December 12 - Full license issued.
  - December 20 - Becomes the 52nd FM radio station in the country to open.
- October 1, 2003 - Program lineup and logo are renewed under the motto "A FRESH NEW LOOK".
- December 20, 2005 - 5th anniversary of launch.
- April 1, 2008 - Emergency Earthquake Alerts are launched. A commercial "Emergency Earthquake Alerts: Announcements from 4 Niigata Radio Stations" is broadcast, featuring announcers and navigators from NHK Niigata Broadcasting Station, Niigata Broadcasting, FM Radio Niigata, and Niigata Prefectural FM Broadcasting.
- December 20, 2010 - 10th anniversary of launch.
- April 2, 2012 - Joined the Internet IP simulcast radio "radiko". Trial broadcasting began within Niigata Prefecture only at 12:00, together with Niigata Broadcasting and FM Radio Niigata. The station symbol is now "FMPORT", with the gap filled in.
- December 20, 2015 - 15th anniversary of launch.
- 2020
  - March 18 - The station's closure is resolved at the board of directors meeting on this day.
  - March 31 - The closure is officially announced.
  - June 30, 11:59 p.m. - The station closes. The curtain falls on the company's 7,133-day (19 years, 6 months, 11 days) history. At the same time, radiko's broadcasting, including Time Free, ends.
  - July 14 - Bankruptcy proceedings begin. Total debt is approximately 220 million yen.
- 2023
  - October 17 - Liquidation is completed.

== Broadcasting station overview ==
Call sign

- JOWV-FM

Head office/music hall

- 3rd floor, Cosmic Building, 1-1 Bandai 2-chome, Chuo-ku, Niigata-shi, Niigata

Tokyo branch

- 2nd floor, Chuetsu Transportation Tokyo branch, 2-16-2 Nishi-Nippori 5-chome, Arakawa-ku, Tokyo

== Programs ==
- °C-ute Maimi Yajima's I My Me Maimi~
- Chiharu Matsuyama on the Radio (simulcast on FM Nack5, Saitama)

== See also ==
- FM broadcasting in Japan
