= Keiko Kitagawa =

Japanese actress and model (born 1986)

- 北川 景子
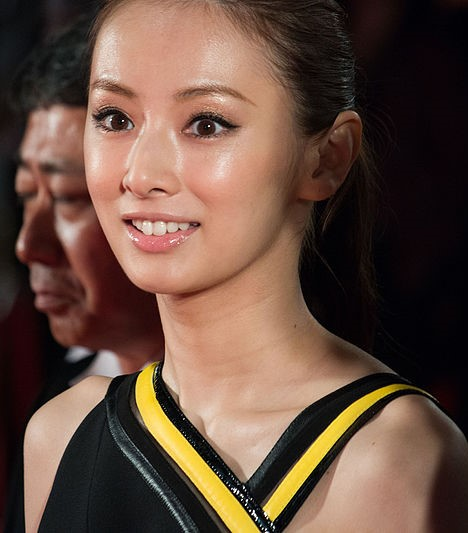
- Kitagawa at the Tokyo International Film Festival in October 2015
- Born: August 22, 1986 (age 40); Kobe, Hyōgo, Japan
- Education: Meiji University
- Occupation: Actress
- Years active: 2003–present
- Agent: Stardust Promotion
- Height: 1.60 m (5 ft 3 in)
- Spouse: Daigo (m. 2016)
- Children: 2
- Website: official.stardust.co.jp

Keiko Kitagawa (北川 景子, Kitagawa Keiko; born August 22, 1986) is a Japanese actress. She was an exclusive model for the Japanese Seventeen magazine from late 2003 to mid-2006, and quit modeling when she left the magazine. Her first acting role was Sailor Mars in the Sailor Moon live action show Pretty Guardian Sailor Moon (2003–2004), and after her role in the film Mamiya Kyōdai, she left modeling to concentrate on acting. She has appeared in several films, including The Fast and the Furious: Tokyo Drift (2006) and Handsome Suit (2008), and has played leading roles in the TV Dramas Mop Girl (2007), Homeroom on the Beachside (2008), Buzzer Beat (2009), Lady Saigo no Hanzai Profile (2011), and Akumu-chan (2012).

== Biography ==
Kitagawa was born on August 22, 1986, in Hyōgo Prefecture, Japan. She grew up in Kobe, and lost many friends in the Great Hanshin earthquake in 1995. As a child, she wanted to be a doctor, but by the time she reached high school she was uncertain of what to do in the future. Around this time, she was scouted by a talent agency, and decided to try the entertainment world. Her parents were initially opposed, but they gave their permission on two conditions: that she give up if she was making no progress within a year, and that she put her studies first and graduate from university. She graduated from Meiji University in Tokyo in March 2009.

== Career ==
Within a week of joining an agency, Kitagawa was selected as a model and an actress. She was chosen as Miss Seventeen in 2003, which led to her working as a model with the Japanese Seventeen until she graduated from the magazine in September 2006. In the latter part of the run, she had her regular feature, "Keiko's Beauty Honey".

As an actress, Kitagawa was given the role of Rei Hino in the live action television series of Sailor Moon, which began her acting career. Her first significant film role was in Mamiya Kyōdai, and because of the influence of the director, Yoshimitsu Morita, she decided to concentrate on acting rather than modeling. She initially concentrated on films, including the leading roles in Cherry Pie and Dear Friends. In late 2007, she had her first leading role in a TV drama, in the late-night drama Mop Girl. In 2008, she was given the role of the heroine in Homeroom on the Beachside, Fuji Television's Monday 9pm drama for the summer season.

Kitagawa moved to Tokyo when she started working as an actress and model, and has lived there since. She traveled to California to film The Fast and the Furious: Tokyo Drift, and returned there to study English for a couple of months early in 2006. From May to December 2007, she wrote a column entitled "Keytan Hakusho" for the Japanese weekly television listings magazine Weekly The Television.

Kitagawa has described herself as a stay-at-home person who likes watching DVDs, listening to music, and reading books. When asked what she would do if the world were going to end tomorrow, she said "read books". She is managed by Stardust Promotion.

She has appeared in the films Mizu ni Sumu Hana (2006), Mamiya Kyōdai (2006), The Fast and the Furious: Tokyo Drift (2006), Cherry Pie (lead role) (2006), Dear Friends (lead role) (2007), Sono Toki ha Kare ni Yoroshiku (2007), Southbound (2007), Heat Island (2007), Handsome Suit (2008), Orion in Midsummer (2009), I'll Pay (2009), After the Flowers (lead role) (2010), and Matataki (lead role) (2010), and Elevator to the Scaffold (2010).

She appeared in the TV dramas Pretty Guardian Sailor Moon (2003–4), Mop Girl (lead role) (2007), Homeroom on the Beachside (2008), Buzzer Beat (2009), and Moon Lovers (2010), The After-Dinner Mysteries (2011), Hero (2014), and Detective versus Detectives (2015).

== Personal life ==
In 2016, Kitagawa married singer-songwriter Daigo. The same year, Kitagawa won the Japanese Television Academy Award for Best Actress for Your Home is My Business!.

On April 22, 2020, she announced her first pregnancy. On September 7, she gave birth to her daughter. On September 25, 2023, Kitagawa and her husband jointly announced through their agency that they are expecting their second child. On January 31, 2024, she gave birth to a son.

== Filmography ==
=== Film ===
Year	Title	Role	Notes	Ref(s)
2006	The Mamiya Brothers	Yumi Honma		
2006	Mizu ni Sumu Hana	Rikka Mizuchi		
2006	The Fast and the Furious: Tokyo Drift	Reiko	American film	
2006	Cherry Pie	Kiyohara	Lead role	
2007	Dear Friends	Rina Takahashi	Lead role	
2007	Say Hello for Me	Momoka Katsuragi		
2007	Southbound	Youko Uehara		
2007	Heat Island	Nao		
2008	The Handsome Suit	Hiroko Hoshino		
2009	Last Operations Under the Orion	Shitsuko Arisawa/Izumi Kuramoto		
2009	It's On Me	reporter	Cameo	
2010	After the Flowers	Ito	Lead role	
2010	Elevator to the Gallows	Mikayo Matsumoto		
2010	Piecing Me Back Together	Izumi Sonoda	Lead role	
2011	Paradise Kiss	Yukari Hayasaka	Lead role	
2012	Magic Tree House	Jack (voice)		
2013	The After-Dinner Mysteries	Hosho Reiko	Lead role	
2013	Roommate	Harumi Hagiwara	Lead role	
2014	Judge!	Hikari Ota		
2014	I Just Wanna Hug You	Tsukasa Yamamoto	Lead role	
2014	Akumu-chan The Movie	Ayami Mutoi	Lead role	
2015	The Pearls of the Stone Man	Satoko Kobayashi		
2015	Something Like, Something Like It	Yumi		
2015	Hero	Chika Asagi		
2017	Hamon: Yakuza Boogie	Yuki		
2017	Let Me Eat Your Pancreas	adult Kyōko Takimoto		
2017	The Last Shot in the Bar	Mari Misaki		
2018	Punk Samurai Slash Down	Ron		
2018	Hibiki	Fumi Hanai		
2018	Stolen Identity	Asami Inaba	Lead role	
2018	My Teacher, My Love		Cameo	
2019	The Hikita's Are Expecting!	Sachi Hikita		
2020	Stolen Identity 2	Asami Inaba	Special appearance	
2020	The Legacy of Dr. Death: Black File	Asuka Takachiho		
2020	The Promised Neverland	Mom Isabella		
2021	First Love	Yuki Makabe	Lead role	
2021	It's a Flickering Life	Sonoko Katsura		
2021	The Night Beyond the Tricornered Window	Keiko		
2022	Dreaming of the Meridian Arc	Eimi Kobayashi / Ei		
2022	Anpanman: Dororin and the Transforming Carnival	Dororin (voice)		
2022	Fragments of the Last Will	Mojimi Yamamoto		
2023	Pretty Guardian Sailor Moon Cosmos The Movie	Sailor Cosmos, Guardian Cosmos (voice)		
2025	Night Flower	Natsuki Nagashima	Lead role	
2026	Cry Out	Ayano Saeki		

=== Television drama ===
Year	Title	Role	Notes	Ref(s)
2003–04	Pretty Guardian Sailor Moon	Rei Hino / Sailor Mars	Tokusatsu drama based on the manga Sailor Moon	
2007	Mop Girl	Momoko Hasegawa	Lead role	
2008	Taiyo to Umi no Kyoshitsu	Enokido Wakaba		
2009	Buzzer Beat	Riko Shirakawa	Lead role	
2010	Hostess with a Pen	Rie Saito	Lead role; television film; based on a true story of Rie Saito	
2010	Tsuki no Koibito	Ōnuki Yuzuki		
2011	Lady: Saigo no Hanzai Profile	Kazuki Shōko	Lead role	
2011	The After-Dinner Mysteries	Reiko Hosho	Lead role	
2011	Kono Sekai no Katasumi ni	Suzu	Lead role; television film	
2012	The After-Dinner Mysteries SP	Reiko Hosho	Lead role	
2012	My Little Nightmare	Mutoi Ayami	Lead role	
2012	Mi o Tsukushi Ryoricho	Mio	Lead role; television film	
2013	A Swinging Single	Haruno Yuki		
2014	Mi o Tsukushi Ryoricho 2	Mio	Lead role; television film	
2014	Hero	Chika Asagi		
2015	Detective versus Detectives	Rena Sasaki	Lead role	
2016	Kuroi Jukai	Shōko Kasahara	Lead role; television film	
2016	Hippocratic Oath	Makoto Tsugano	Lead role; mini-series	
2016–19	Your Home is My Business!	Machi Sangen'ya	Lead role; 2 seasons	
2017	Happiness's Memory	Nanami Tsushima	Television film	
2017	True Horror Stories: Summer 2017	Kyoka Fukagawa	Lead role; short drama	
2018	Segodon	Atsuhime	Taiga drama	
2018	Shitei Bengoshi	Yui Hitotsugi	Lead role; television film	
2018	Fake News	Itsuki Shinonome	Lead role; mini-series	
2021	How to Get a Divorce for the Whole Family!	Saki Mizuguchi	Lead role	
2023	What Will You Do, Ieyasu?	Oichi and Yodo-dono	Taiga drama	
2023	Themis's Law School Classroom	Shizuku Hiiragi	Lead role	
2023	Sunset	Kaori Hasebe	Lead role; mini-series	
2025	Hana Noren	Taka Kawashima	Lead role; television film	
2025	Since I Took You Away	Hiromi Nakagoshi	Lead role	
2025–26	The Ghost Writer's Wife	Tae Ushimizu	Asadora	
2026	Shiawase wa Aru	Kanako Idemitsu	Lead role; television film	

=== Documentary ===
Year	Title	Network	Notes
2012	Kagayaku On'na `Kitagawa Keiko'	NHK BS Premium	
2013	Kitagawa Keiko × Chichūkai Megami-tachi o Sagashite	NHK BS Premium	in 2 parts
2014	Kitagawa Keiko Yuukyuu No Miyako Turkey Istanbul -futari No Kougou Ai No Kiseki Wo Tadoru-	BS Fuji	
2015	The Premium Kitagawa Keiko Suichoku Time Travel in Rome	NHK BS Premium	in 2 parts
2018	Iyoiyo start! BS4K BS8K Kaikyoku Special	NHK	Broadcast in Rome
2019	Nihon ni koi shita Van Gogh ~ Kitagawa Keiko ga Aruku Tensai Gaka no Tabiji ~'	BS Nippon Television	
2020	NHK Special: `Ano Ni~Tsu kara 25-nen Daishinsai no Kodomo-tachi'	NHK	

=== Home Video ===
- 2013 : Kitagawa Keiko Making Documentary "27+" - Documentary

=== Radio ===
- 2006 : Tanabata Nananenkai - As Naomi Setsuraku/Midori Fujikura

=== Books ===
- 2006: Stylish Street Book "I've been to Hollywood!"
- 2007: Kitagawa Keiko Shashinshū Dear Friends
- 2008: Actress Make Up
- 2010: Actress Make Up II
- 2011: Eiga "Paradise Kiss" official murasaki by Kitagawa Keiko Fashion Photo Book
- 2013: Original 1st shashin-shū 27' (Ni Juna Na)
- 2015: PARIGOT: Light in the Night in Marunouchi
- 2016: Keiko Kitagawa 2nd shashin-shū 30 (Angel works)
- 2023: Keiko Kitagawa Photobook: "37" 20th anniversary

=== CD ===
- 2004: Sakura Fubuki ("Cherry Blossom Storm")/Hoshi Furu Yoake ("Stars Fall at Dawn") (as Rei Hino)

== Awards and nominations ==
Year	Award	Category	Work(s)	Result	Ref.
2015	39th Elan d'or Awards	Newcomer of the Year	Herself	Won	
2018	41st Japan Academy Film Prize	Best Supporting Actress	The Last Shot in the Bar	Nominated	
2025	50th Hochi Film Awards	Best Actress	Night Flower	Won	
2025	Elle Cinema Awards 2025	Elle Best Actress	Night Flower	Won	
2026	80th Mainichi Film Awards	Best Lead Performance	Night Flower	Nominated	
2026	68th Blue Ribbon Awards	Best Actress	Night Flower	Nominated	
2026	49th Japan Academy Film Prize	Best Actress	Night Flower	Nominated	
