= 28th Japan Academy Film Prize =

Japanese film awards in 2005

- Date: February 18, 2005
- Site: Grand Prince Hotel New Takanawa, Tokyo, Japan
- Hosted by: Hiroshi Sekiguchi; Shinobu Terajima

Highlights
- Best Picture: Half a Confession
- Most awards: Swing Girls (5)
- Most nominations: Blood and Bones (12); Crying Out Love in the Center of the World (12); Half a Confession (12); The Hidden Blade (12)

The 28th Japan Academy Film Prize (第28回日本アカデミー賞) is the 28th edition of the Japan Academy Film Prize, an award presented by the Nippon Academy-Sho Association to award excellence in filmmaking. It awarded the best films of 2004 and it took place on February 18, 2005 at the Grand Prince Hotel New Takanawa in Tokyo, Japan.

== Nominees ==
=== Awards ===
Picture of the Year	Director of the Year
Half a Confession; The Hidden Blade; Swing Girls; Crying Out Love in the Center of the World; Blood and Bones	Yoichi Sai – Blood and Bones; Kiyoshi Sasabe – Half a Confession; Shinobu Yaguchi – Swing Girls; Yoji Yamada – The Hidden Blade; Isao Yukisada – Crying Out Love in the Center of the World
Screenplay of the Year	Popularity Award
Shinobu Yaguchi – Swing Girls; Yoichi Sai and Chong Wishing – Blood and Bones; Toshiyuki Tabe and Kiyoshi Sasabe – Half a Confession; Kōki Mitani – University of Laughs; Yoji Yamada and Yoshitaka Asama – The Hidden Blade	Swing Girls (Production Category); Masami Nagasawa – Crying Out Love in the Center of the World (Actor Category)
Outstanding Performance by an Actor in a Leading Role	Outstanding Performance by an Actress in a Leading Role
Akira Terao – Half a Confession; Show Aikawa – Zebraman; Takao Osawa – Gege; Masatoshi Nagase – The Hidden Blade; Kōji Yakusho – University of Laughs	Kyōka Suzuki – Blood and Bones; Yūko Takeuchi – Be with You; Takako Tokiwa – Akai Tsuki; Kyoko Fukada – Kamikaze Girls; Takako Matsu – The Hidden Blade
Outstanding Performance by an Actor in a Supporting Role	Outstanding Performance by an Actress in a Supporting Role
Joe Odagiri – Blood and Bones; Teruyuki Kagawa – Akai Tsuki; Kyōhei Shibata – Half a Confession; Mirai Moriyama – Crying Out Love in the Center of the World; Hidetaka Yoshioka – The Hidden Blade	Masami Nagasawa – Crying Out Love in the Center of the World; Kirin Kiki – Half a Confession; Tomoko Tabata – Blood and Bones; Anna Tsuchiya – Kamikaze Girls; You – Nobody Knows
Outstanding Achievement in Music	Outstanding Achievement in Cinematography
Mickie Yoshino and Hiroshi Kishimoto – Swing Girls; Taro Iwashiro – Blood and Bones; Tamiya Terashima – Half a Confession; Isao Tomita – The Hidden Blade; Meina Co. – Crying Out Love in the Center of the World	Noboru Shinoda – Crying Out Love in the Center of the World; Daisaku Kimura – Akai Tsuki; Mutsuo Naganuma – The Hidden Blade; Mutsuo Naganuma – Half a Confession; Takeshi Hamada – Blood and Bones
Outstanding Achievement in Lighting Direction	Outstanding Achievement in Art Direction
Yūki Nakamura – Crying Out Love in the Center of the World; Mitsuo Watanabe – Akai Tsuki; Gengon Nakaoka – The Hidden Blade; Sōsuke Yoshikado – Half a Confession; Hitoshi Takaya – Blood and Bones	Mitsuo Degawa and Yoshinobu Nishioka – The Hidden Blade; Toshihiro Isomi – Blood and Bones; Katsuhiro Fukuzawa – Akai Tsuki; Shū Yamaguchi – Crying Out Love in the Center of the World; Hidemitsu Yamazaki – Half a Confession
Outstanding Achievement in Sound Recording	Outstanding Achievement in Film Editing
Hiromichi Koori – Swing Girls; Hironori Itō – Crying Out Love in the Center of the World; Kazumi Kishida – The Hidden Blade; Yasuo Takano – Half a Confession; Susumu Take and Osamu Onodera – Blood and Bones	Ryūji Miyajima – Swing Girls; Iwao Ishii – The Hidden Blade; Tsuyoshi Imai – Crying Out Love in the Center of the World; Hideaki Oohata – Half a Confession; Yoshiyuki Okuhara – Blood and Bones
Outstanding Foreign Language Film	Newcomer of the Year
The Last Samurai; Seabiscuit; Troy; Mystic River; The Lord of the Rings: The Return of the King	Yūta Hiraoka – Swing Girls; Mirai Moriyama – Crying Out Love in the Center of the World; Misaki Ito – Umineko; Juri Ueno – Swing Girls; Anna Tsuchiya – Kamikaze Girls; Yo Hitoto – Café Lumière
Special Award from the Association	Award for Distinguished Service from the Chairman
Kei Ijichi (Producer); Masatoshi Saitō and staff (Sound Effect); Godzilla	Crying Out Love in the Center of the World Production Team
Special Award from the Chairman	
Tatsuya Mihashi (Actor)	
