= Yūta Hiraoka =

Japanese actor (born 1984)

- 平岡 祐太
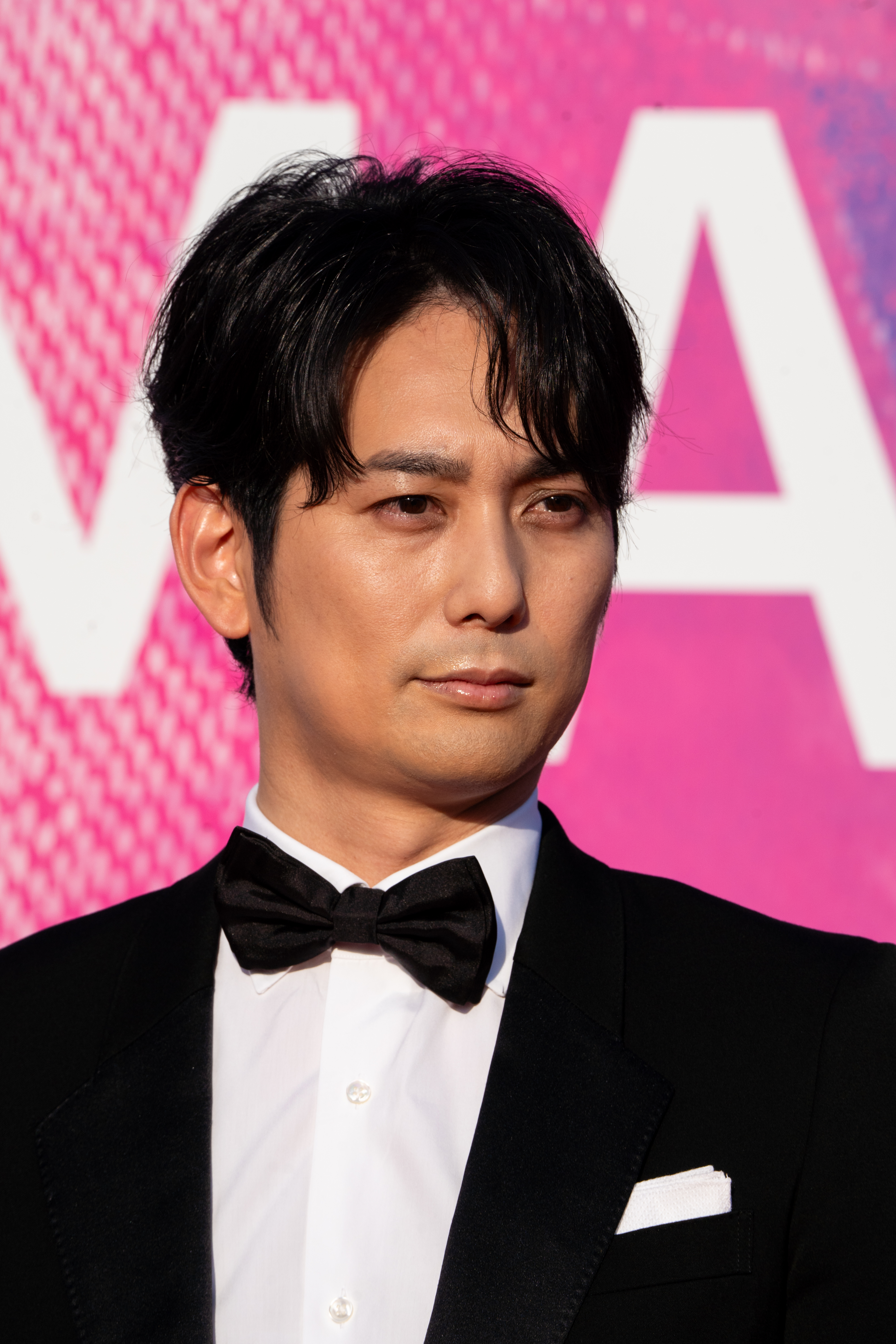
- Born: September 1, 1984 (age 42); Hiroshima Prefecture, Japan
- Other name: Yūpa
- Occupation: Actor
- Years active: 2003–present
- Agent: Amuse, Inc.
- Awards: Newcomer of the Year (28th Japan Academy Prize)
- Website: www.hiraokayuta.com

Yūta Hiraoka (平岡 祐太, Hiraoka Yūta; born September 1, 1984) is a Japanese actor who belongs to the talent agency Amuse, Inc. He gained recognition in 2004 film Swing Girls and won "Newcomer of the Year" Award at 28th Japan Academy Prize. Then he appeared in several dramas and films, including Water Boys 2005 Summer, Tokyo Friends: The Movie (2006), Daisuki!! (2008), Kiina (2009), NECK (2010), The Reason I Can't Find My Love (2011), ATARU (2012), Ando ♡ Roid (2013), Hanasaki Mai Speaks Out (2014), Attack on Titan: Counter Rockets (2015), Specialist (2016), Tokyo Tarareba Girls (2017) and best known for the role of "Mikio Enokido" (榎戸 幹雄) in 2007 TV drama series Operation Love.

== Filmography ==
=== Television dramas ===
- Lion Sensei (2003)
- Medaka (2004)
- Oto no Nai Aozora (2005)
- Tokyo Friends (2005)
- Water Boys 2005 Summer (2005)
- Dangerous Beauty (2005)
- Honto ni Atta Kowai Hanashi (2006)
- Message (2006)
- An Automaton in Long Sleep (2006)
- Love of My Life (2006)
- Tokyo Tower (2007)
- Love Never to End (2007)
- Operation Love (2007)
- First Kiss (2007)
- Daisuki!! (2008)
- Operation Love SP (2008)
- Average 1 (2008)
- Miracle Zoo 2008: The Story of Asahiyama Zoo (2008)
- Monster Parent (2008)
- The Naminori Restaurant (2008)
- Average 2 (2008)
- Akuma no Temari Uta (2009)
- Kiina (2009)
- GodHand Teru (2009)
- Hataraku Gon! (2009)
- Sakuya Konohana (2010)
- Ryōmaden (2010)
- Oh! my PROPOSE (2010)
- LADY - The Last Criminal Profile (2011)
- The Reason I Can't Find My Love (2011)
- He is my Sister's Lover (2011)
- GTO New Year's Special (2012)
- FUTURE DIARY -ANOTHER:WORLD- (2012)
- ATARU (2012)
- Ya days to become Toba·Toshijima Paradise (2012)
- Tokyo Airport: Air Traffic Controller (2012)
- Strawberry Night: After The Invisible Rain (2013)
- Vampire Heaven (2013)
- Specialist 1 (2013)
- Ando ♡ Roid (2013)
- Once Upon a Time in Beitou (2014)
- Specialist 2 (2013)
- Hanasaki Mai Speaks Out (2014)
- Family Hunter (2014)
- Time Spiral (2014)
- Dear Sister (2014)
- Matching Love 2 (2014)
- Specialist 3 (2015)
- Attack on Titan: Counter Rockets (2015)
- Teddy Go! (2015)
- Specialist 4 (2015)
- Specialist (2016)
- Beppinsan (2016)
- The Single Teacher Miss Hayako (2017)
- Tokyo Tarareba Girls (2017)
- Kensho Sousa (2017)
- New Mitsuhiko Asami Series (2017 - )
- Funohan (2018)
- Holiday Love (2018)
- Tokumei Keiji Kakuho No Onna (2018)
- Koujin (2018)
- Hanzai No Kaisou (2018)
- Keishicho Zero Gakari: Third Season (2018)
- Maji de Koukai Shitemasu: Second Season (2018)
- Yotsuba Ginko Harashima Hiromi ga mono mosu! - Kono Hito ni Kakero (2019)
- Onna no Kigen no Naoshi Kata (2019)
- The Woman of S.R.I. Season 19 (2019)
- In Hand (2019)
- Babysitter Gin (2019)
- Super Space Sheriff Gavan Infinity (2026)
- Kakusei Hunter Omegahorn (2026)

=== Film ===
Year	Title	Role	Notes	Ref.
2004	Swing Girls	Takuo Nakamura (Piano)		
2004	Be with You	Yuji Aio (18 years old)		
2005	NANA	Shoji Endo		
2005	A Day Beyond the Horizon	Aki	Lead role	
2006	Check It Out, Yo!	Tetsuo Tamashiro		
2006	Trick: The Movie 2	Kazuhiko Aonuma		
2006	Tokyo Friends: The Movie	Hidetoshi Tanaka		
2006	Christmas on July 24th Avenue	Prince No.5	Cameo	
2007	My Sister, My Love	Haruka Yano		
2007	Happy Dining Table	Nao Nakahara		
2007	Presents: Sea Urchin Rice Cracker	Satoru Takano		
2009	Dance, Subaru!	Kohei		
2009	Last Operations Under the Orion	Makoto Tsubota		
2010	NECK	Mataro Echizen		
2012	Bread of Happiness	Tokio Yamashita		
2012	It's a Beautiful Life - IRODORI	Haruhiko Eda		
2013	Kids Return: The Reunion	Shinji	Lead role	
2016	Enishi: The Bride of Izumo	Kazunori Nakamura		
2016	Equation of Love and Tone Deafness	Kazuyuki Ogawa		
2016	L	Theatrical company Youth		
2019	Onna no Kigen no Naoshi Kata	Seiji Aoyagi		
2021	A Sower of Seeds 4	Ryoichi Yamada		
2022	Fullmetal Alchemist: The Final Alchemy	Miles		
2023	Majo no Kōsui	Ren Yokoyama		
2023	Immersion	Haruki		
2025	Requiem	Takumi	Lead role	

=== Stage play ===
Year	Title	Role	Notes	Ref.
2010	Soutaiteki-ukiyoe	Tatsuo Misaki	Bunkamura Theatre Cocoon; Umeda Arts Theater Theater Drama City; Nagoya Shimin Hall Prunier Hall; Aster Plaza Great Hall; Kitakyushu Performing Arts Center Mid Hall	
2011	Tenshu Monogatari	Zushonosuke Himekawa	New National Theatre, Tokyo	
2012	Love Letters	Andy	PARCO Theater	

=== Regular TV Show ===
Year	Title	Channel	Notes	Ref.
2005 - 2006	Our after-school Variety: Nice Shoot!	GyaO	Web television program	
2007 - 2008	Dream Hill Residence	Music On! TV	Wednesday's Host	

=== Music video ===
Year	Song	Artist	Ref.
2005	Mirai	Mr.Children	
2013	30	Ms.OOJA	

=== Narration ===
Year	Title	Channel	Ref.
2011	Messi TV	WOWOW	
2012	Mitsuaki Iwago's World "Cats" Travelogue: Sorrento and Capri	NHK BS Premium	
2013	Mitsuaki Iwago's World "Cats" Travelogue Highlights: Cats Of The Mediterranean Sea	NHK BS Premium	

=== Video game ===
Year	Title	Role	Platform	Developer	Publisher	Ref.
2010	TRICK×LOGIC: Season 1	Itsuki Yoshikawa	PlayStation Portable	Chunsoft	Sony Interactive Entertainment	
2010	TRICK×LOGIC: Season 2	Itsuki Yoshikawa	PlayStation Portable	Chunsoft	Sony Interactive Entertainment	
2022	The Centennial Case: A Shijima Story	Eiji Shijima	Microsoft Windows, PlayStation 4, PlayStation 5, Nintendo Switch	Square Enix	Square Enix	

== Endorsement ==
Year	Category	Content	Notes	Ref.
2004	CM	Pizza Hut		
2005	CM	Pocari Sweat	Cast with Haruka Ayase	
2005	CM	Shogakukan Telepal f		
2006	CM / Poster	Mizuho Bank Mizuho Mileage Club		
2006 - 2008	CM	Volvic (mineral water)		
2007 - 2009	CM	Aeon (language school)		
2009 - 2010	CM	NTT Communications "CreativE-Life" for Everyone		
2009 - 2011	CM	P&G Bold (detergent)	Cast with Nene Otsuka and Shoko Aida	
2010	CM	Suntory Intelligentsia	Cast with Yutaka Ooe	
2012	AD	Chiyoda HYDRO-TECH BLACK COLLECTION		
2012 - 2013	CM	Smirnoff Music and Smirnoff time		
2012 - 2013	Campaign	Nexon My Pride Floating island Contest		
2013	Collaboration	The Rolling Stones 2013 Collaboration T-shirt		
2013 - 2016	CM	Kao Magiclean AROMA	Cast with Kaoru Hirata	
2014	CM	Kao Resesh Deodrant Power		
2015	CM	Sapporo Ichiban		
2015	CM	KUZUHA MALL DRAMATIC MALL		
2015 -	Model	GISELe HOMMe	Men's fashion brand	
2016	Campaign	Megmilk Snow Brand Kasane-Dolce		
2017	Campaign / Poster	Nichiban ROIHI-TSUBOKO		
2017	AD	Yamaguchi Prefectural Tourism Federation	Tourist guidebook (Sep. - Dec.)	
2018	Collaboration	Kirin GOGO NO KOCHA × Glico Pocky	Acai Boy 360° slideshow	

== Accolade ==
Year	Award	Category	Notes	Ref.
2002	15th Junon Super Boy Contest	Grand Prix	Performance: Original "Junon 2002" guitar	
2005	28th Japan Academy Prize	Newcomer of the Year	Nominated work: Swing Girls	
2014	Lacoste Beautiful Awards	Actor Award		
