= Girl in the Sunny Place =

- Directed by: Takahiro Miki
- Written by: Osamu Koshigaya; Kosuke Mukai
- Starring: Jun Matsumoto; Juri Ueno
- Music by: Mio Studio
- Distributed by: Toho Company/Asmik Ace Entertainment
- Release date: October 12, 2013
- Running time: 129 minutes
- Language: Japanese

Girl in the Sunny Place (陽だまりの彼女, Hidamari No Kanojo) is a 2013 Japanese fantasy romance film directed by Takahiro Miki. The film, about an ordinary young couple named Kosuke and Mao, is based on a novel by Osamu Koshigaya of the same name that ranked first among novels which Japanese girls wanted boys to read in the year 2011, and has sold more than one million copies in Japan.

== Plot ==
Kosuke and Mao were classmates in the Junior High School and they were also each other's "first love". However, their relationship was ended when Kosuke transferred to another school. Since then they never contacted each other again.

10 Years Later, Kosuke started working as a Salesman at a Railway Advertising Company. That's when the miracle reunion happened, when he met Mao at the presentation for the company that Mao's working for.

Both of them fell in love again and decided to marry soon after that.

Kosuke and Mao started a very happy married life. Everything seems to go well for them. Until the "Incident" happened.

The next day after that "Incident", Mao disappeared. Things went wrong and became strange because everyone slowly started to lose their memories of Mao.

Kosuke ran around, looking for Mao. Finally, he decided to go back to their memorable place just to find out the "Secret" that Mao was hiding from him.

== Cast ==
- Jun Matsumoto as Kosuke Okuda
- Juri Ueno as Mao Watarai
- Tetsuji Tamayama as Haruki Shindo (Mao's Co-worker)
- Masaki Suda as Shota Okuda (Kosuke's younger brother)
- Takumi Kitamura as Kosuke Okuda (when in Junior High School)
- Wakana Aoi as Mao Watarai (when in Junior High School)
- Mari Natsuki as Oshita (Mysterious Old Lady)
- Mitsuki Tanimura as Yuri Minegishi
- Maho Toyota as Reiko Kajiwara
- Naomi Nishida as Sachie Okuda
- Sansei Shiomi as Kozo Watarai
- Midori Kiuchi as Mayuko Watarai

== Music ==
Theme songs were "Wouldn't It Be Nice" by The Beach Boys and Hikari to Kimi E No Requiem (光と君へのレクイエム) by Tatsuro Yamashita

== Awards ==
- [2013] Movie Plus Awards : Won Movie Plus Awards 2013 : Best Director : Takahiro Miki
- [2013] Movie Plus Awards : Won Movie Plus Awards 2013 : Best Actor : Jun Matsumoto
- [2013] Movie Plus Awards : Won Movie Plus Awards 2013 : Best Couple : Juri Ueno, Jun Matsumoto
