= Chirusoku no Natsu =

- DVD cover
- Directed by: Kiyoshi Sasabe
- Written by: Kiyoshi Sasabe
- Produced by: Masaaki Usui
- Starring: Juri Ueno; Yuri Mizutani; Asami Katsura; Yasuyo Mimura; Junpei Suzuki
- Cinematography: Masaaki Sakae
- Edited by: Masafumi Aoyama
- Music by: Mino Kabasawa
- Production companies: Eisei Gekijo; Japan Home Video; Premier International Corporation; Prénom H Co. Ltd.
- Release date: 2004
- Running time: 114 minutes
- Country: Japan
- Language: Japanese

Chirusoku no Natsu (Japanese: チルソクの夏; lit. Chirusoku Summer), also known as The Stars Converge, is a 2004 Japanese film directed by Kiyoshi Sasabe.

== Cast ==
- Juri Ueno as Mari Sugiyama
- Yuri Mizutani as Ikuko Endo
- Asami Katsura as Tomoe Fujimura
- Yasuyo Mimura as Reiko Kigawa
- Junpei Suzuki (credited as Junpei)
- Joji Yamamoto as Ikuko's father
- Takayo Mimura as Ikuko Kigawa
- Mio Takaki as Ikuko, 26 years later
- Mari Natsuki
- Midori Kanazawa
- Iruka

== Awards ==
- Won: 2003 Directors Guild of Japan New Directors Award - Kiyoshi Sasabe
