= Attack on Titan: Counter Rockets =

Japanese web miniseries

- DVD cover
- Directed by: Kimiyoshi Adachi (Episode 1); Katsuro Onoue (Episode 2); Yoshihiro Nishimura (Episode 3)
- Starring: Satomi Ishihara; Nanami Sakuraba; Shu Watanabe; Rina Takeda; Ayame Misaki; Yuta Hiraoka
- Country of origin: Japan
- Original language: Japanese
- No. of series: 1
- No. of episodes: 3

Production
- Running time: 30 minutes
- Production company: Toho

Original release
- Network: dTV
- Release: August 15 – August 29, 2015

Attack on Titan: Counter Rockets, also known as Attack on Titan: Hangeki no Noroshi (進撃の巨人 反撃の狼煙, Shingeki no Kyojin ~Hangeki no Noroshi~) and Attack on Titan: Beacon for Counterattack, is a Japanese live-action web miniseries based on the manga series Attack on Titan by Hajime Isayama. It serves as a prequel to the 2015 live-action Attack on Titan film.

== Plot ==
A three-episode web series based on the live-action film adaptations Attack on Titan and Attack on Titan: End of the World. It features the same cast from the movies and tells a new story about the everyday lives and secrets of soldiers; particularly Hange's Titan research and the creation of the omni-directional mobility gear in the films' continuity.

== Cast ==
- Satomi Ishihara as Hange
- Nanami Sakuraba as Sasha
- Rina Takeda as Lil
- Shu Watanabe as Fukushi
- Ayame Misaki as Hiana
- Yuta Hiraoka as Izuru
- Yu Kamio as Yunohira

== Episodes ==
No.	Title	Original release date
1	"The Strike Back Begins"	August 15, 2015
Soldiers are engaged in training and developing weapons for the fight against the Titans. One day, Izuru is sent from the Public Security Command Bureau and meets Hange who has been researching the ecosystem of the Titans. She is secretly advancing studies on the Titans in her own research lab. Developing an interest in Hange, Izuru infiltrates the lab and learns that a Titan which was successfully captured, is sequestered in there.
2	"The Arrow of Hope"	August 22, 2015
Sasha, who is good with bow and arrows had been hunting and living with her people, but is forced from her village because of the Titans' attack. As a result of the attack, she becomes a new personnel and diligently trains every day. One night, an incident happens with the discovery of a suspicious-looking youth.
3	"The Departure to Freedom"	August 29, 2015
Fukushi and Lil are particularly outstanding among the new personnel. Lil's parents were eaten by the Titans and she has been training every day so that she will be the strongest, in preparation for the inevitable fight against the Titans. Fukushi is attracted to Lil and secretly likes her. One day, the two of them who each have feelings, mingle and a bruising battle starts to develop.

== Production ==
As of June 27, 2015, cast members Satomi Ishihara (Hange), Nanami Sakuraba (Sasha), Shu Watanabe (Fukushi), Rina Takeda (Lil), and Kamio Yu (Yunohira) have been confirmed to appear in the series; along with Yuta Hiraoka as an original character for the web drama, Izuru. "Hangeki no Yaiba" ("Counter Blade"), performed by Japanese rock band Wagakki Band, was revealed as the theme song for the series, and it will be included in the band's upcoming second full album Yasou Emaki to be released on September 2.

== Home media ==
In 2016, both Australia's Madman Entertainment and Hong Kong's Edko Films released the series on Blu-ray and DVD under the title Attack on Titan: Hangeki no Noroshi in Japanese with English subtitles.
