= Ando-Roid =

Japanese television drama

- Promotional poster
- Also known as: Ando ♡ Roid
- Genre: Sci-Fi, romance
- Written by: Yumie Nishiogi; Yōko Izumisawa
- Starring: Takuya Kimura; Kou Shibasaki; Yuko Oshima; Kenta Kiritani; Tsubasa Honda
- Opening theme: ARX II-13 by Yugo Kanno
- Ending theme: Your Eyes by Mariya Takeuchi
- Country of origin: Japan
- Original language: Japanese
- No. of episodes: 10

Production
- Producers: Hiroki Ueda; Toshio Tsuboi
- Running time: 54 minutes

Original release
- Network: TBS
- Release: October 13 – December 15, 2013

Ando-Roid, stylized as Andō ♡ Roid (安堂ロイド〜A.I. knows LOVE?〜, Andō Lloyd: A.I. knows Love?), is a Japanese television drama series which premiered on TBS on 13 October 2013. Takuya Kimura is the lead actor, and he plays dual role in this drama. The 1st episode is 69 minutes, 2nd episode is 64 minutes long.

== Plot ==
Reiji Matsushima is a genius physicist. He realizes that he and his fiancé Asahi Ando will be killed as a result of the theory which he developed. One day, in the year 2013, Reiji dies in an airplane explosion & crash. He was a handsome and world-famous professor who studied wormhole theories. It is a mystery whether his research on wormhole theory caused his death or not. His fiancé Asahi is a capable career woman working at a large IT company. She is beautiful and smart, but she met Reiji and fell in love with him. Her days with Reiji were happy, but one day he dies and somebody tries to kill her. Asahi doesn't know why someone wants to end her life. Lloyd, who looks exactly like her dead fiancé Reiji, suddenly appears in front of her. Lloyd came from the year 2113. His mission is to protect Asahi from any risky situations. Without Asahi's knowledge, Lloyd fights to protect her. Lloyd doesn't know what "love" is and doesn't understand human anger or sadness. At first, Asahi doesn't like Lloyd, but slowly her feelings change. Lloyd also begins to develop feelings for her.

== Cast ==
- Takuya Kimura as Andō Lloyd/Reiji Matsushima (dual role)
- Ko Shibasaki as Asahi Andō, Reiji's fiancée
- Yuko Oshima as Nanase Matsushima, Reiji's sister
- Tsubasa Honda as Sapuri, a fixer android
- Kenta Kiritani as Shinzō Hoshi, a computer expert work for Asahi
- Sayaka Yamaguchi as Sakiko Komatsu, a woman work with Hoshi
- Jessie as Tom Edogawa, Reiji's lab assistant
- Mizuki Yamamoto as Kaoru Kuriyama, Reiji's lab assistant
- Dai Ikeda as Tomoharu Kurata, Reiji's lab assistant
- Yōjin Hino as Yoshiyuki Tomiya, a detective
- Kenichi Endō as Isaku Ashimo, a detective
- Mirei Kiritani as a mysterious beautiful girl
- Yūta Hiraoka as Hajime Kadoshiro, a mysterious bureaucrat executive
- Yūko Natori as Keiko Andō, Asahi's mother

== Episodes ==
No.	Title	Directed by	Original release date	Ratings (%)
1	"永遠に君を護る!"	Takafumi Hatano	October 13, 2013	19.2
2	"母の愛、家族の絆"	Takafumi Hatano	October 20, 2013	15.2
3	"触れあう二人の孤独な気持ち"	Hisashi Kimura	October 27, 2013	13.2
4	"アンドロイドは愛を知った"	Hisashi Kimura	November 3, 2013	10.3
5	"今夜衝撃の第5話!愛を知ったロイドが涙を流す...。 怒濤の展開への序章"	Toshio Tsuboi	November 10, 2013	11.5
6	"優しい嘘・悲しい真実"	Takafumi Hatano	November 17, 2013	11.4
7	"ロイド!!あなたは私が護る"	Toshio Tsuboi	November 24, 2013	11.2
8	"想いは奇跡をうむ、誕生の夜"	Takafumi Hatano	December 1, 2013	10.7
9	"兄妹の絆〜孤独が犯した過ち"	Hisashi Kimura	December 8, 2013	10.3
10	"約束の時、想いは永遠に"	Takafumi Hatano	December 15, 2013	12.6

Preceded by Hanzawa Naoki (July 2013 - September 2013)	TBS Sunday Dramas; Sundays 21:00 - 21:54 (JST)	Succeeded by S: Saigo no Keikan (January 2014 - March 2014)
