= Last Friends =

2008 Japanese television drama

- Title card
- ラスト·フレンズ
- Genre: Drama, Friendship
- Created by: Taeko Asano
- Directed by: Endo Mitsutaka; Moriwaki Tomonobu; Miyaki Shogo
- Starring: Masami Nagasawa; Juri Ueno; Eita; Asami Mizukawa; Ryo Nishikido
- Narrated by: Masami Nagasawa; Juri Ueno; Eita
- Theme music composer: Hikaru Utada
- Opening theme: Prisoner of Love
- Composer: Hikaru Utada
- Country of origin: Japan
- Original language: Japanese
- No. of series: 1
- No. of episodes: 12

Production
- Producer: Watanabe Tsuneya
- Running time: 60 min./episode

Original release
- Network: Fuji TV
- Release: April 10 – June 19, 2008

Last Friends (ラスト·フレンズ, Rasuto Furenzu) is a Japanese television drama which aired on Fuji TV at 10:00 pm every Thursday from April 10, 2008, until June 17, 2008. It stars Masami Nagasawa, Juri Ueno, Eita, Asami Mizukawa and Ryo Nishikido. The special, consisting of a recap and some new additional scenes aired on June 26, 2008.

The series follow the life of Michiru Aida, a beauty parlor assistant who returns to Tokyo after 4 years. Bullied by her seniors at work and abused by her boyfriend, she is reunited with her best friend during high school, Ruka Kishimoto, a skilled motocross racer. Takeru, a make-up artist, is introduced to Ruka by her housemate, Eri and thus begin a journey of friendship.

A manga counterpart focusing on Ruka's and Michiru's high school days is currently being published in Malika. Although episode 11 was supposed to be the final episode, a sudden phone call requested the producers to add on a special. A movie has also been announced due to Last Friends' immense popularity.

Last Friends was number 1 on Fuji's top 50 list from June 16 till June 29. However, it had since dropped to 6th place after the broadcast of the special and as of the week of July 7 to 13, Last Friends ranked 9th on the Top 50 list. Aside from the official website at Fuji TV, another website has also been created, named "Last Friends: Another".

== Creation and conception ==
Juri Ueno and Masami Nagasawa were originally approached for the role of Ruka and Michiru. Asami Mizukawa was cast for the other woman character Taeko Asano planned to have in the drama. Takeru, however was a last minute addition because the producers wanted a male presence in the drama. Initially, the drama was to be only about domestic violence (DV) and gender identity disorder, portrayed by Nagasawa and Ueno respectively. A character who used DV was then created.

Ueno was picked by Asano, who saw her performance in Rainbow Song. According to Asano, it was her intuition which said Ueno was perfect for the role of Ruka Kishimoto, a character with gender identity issues. Eita was cast because of his "feminine feel". Nagasawa was selected because Asano thought of her as the "smiling woman who worries".

Takeru's friendship with Ruka was in the "grey zone". Asano stated that Ueno was very enthusiastic about her role from the beginning, asking about the hairstyle and clothing when she accepted the role.

== Theme ==
Centered around the current generation's afflictions, Last Friends follows the various issues of domestic violence, gender dysphoria and trauma. Each of the five characters are represented by an issue, which are:

- Love - Michiru
- Liberation - Ruka
- Agony - Takeru
- Solitude - Eri
- Contradiction - Sousuke

== Synopsis ==
Michiru Aida is a beauty parlour assistant who returns to Tokyo after four years of absence. She moves in with her boyfriend, Sousuke Oikawa, who works in the Child Welfare Division. She quickly becomes the victim of DV and is bullied at her workplace. Ruka Kishimoto is Michiru's best friend that works part-time at a mechanic shop and is a brilliant motocross racer. She has a problem which she cannot confide to anyone and her worry becomes evident throughout the series. Takeru Mizhushima is a professional hair makeup artist by day and a bartender by night who suffers from a traumatic past. The three meet by chance and a journey of friendship begins.

== Plot ==
A pregnant Michiru is first seen walking in a fishing village area, wondering about her friends and a horrible death which occurred laments the fact that she did not have the ability to know what is in a person's heart, and therefore could not stop the death. However, she acknowledges that her friends are supporting her even though she betrayed Ruka.

Present day Tokyo, Michiru is working at a beauty parlour when she sees her boyfriend, Sousuke Oikawa waving at her and pointing out a place to meet him for dinner. When she does, Sousuke gives her a cup for her birthday present and invites her to live together. Michiru gets permission from her mother and tells Sousuke that she will move in soon, first buying pair furniture. At the department store, Michiru is seen by Ruka, who chases the bus Michiru has boarded. In her hurry, Ruka bumps into Takeru and drops her cup. She catches up, and the two meet each other for the first time in four years. Later that day, Ruka meets Takeru again after Eri drags her along to the night bar where Takeru works.

== Cast ==
=== Main characters ===
Michiru Aida (藍田美知留, Aida Michiru)

- Japanese Live action actor: Masami Nagasawa

Michiru Aida is a beauty parlour assistant who gets constantly bullied at her workplace "Niche" by her seniors. Her mother doesn't care about her much, even forgetting her 22nd birthday. She moves in with her boyfriend Sousuke; who is the only one who she can confide her emotional problems to but becomes the victim of domestic violence.

She was Ruka's best friend in middle school and has not seen her for four years after her mother moved them to a relative's place in Choushi. Michiru graduated from high school in 2003.

After returning to Tokyo, she is spotted by Ruka while shopping for new furniture in accordance with moving in with Sousuke. The two then spend time catching up at a park which holds precious memories to each of them. In the past, Michiru would tell Ruka all of her family problems at the very same park, eat ice cream and take shelter from the rain there. When she returns to Sousuke's apartment, she is slapped because Sousuke thought that the messages that Michiru was receiving from Ruka was from a guy. Failing to find the graduation album in her house, Michiru returns and gets slapped again and promises to find it. When she returns to her house again, she sees her mother with another guy, so she decides to go to the park. Ruka finds Michiru by instinct after receiving a miss call from her, and brings Michiru back to the Share House. They spend the night there and after Ruka sees Michiru crying in her sleep, Ruka kisses Michiru.

She gives Ruka a good luck charm for the race, which Ruka considers to be the thing which saved her during the accident which occurred during the race when her bike flipped over. After the accident, Michiru nearly gets attacked by Sousuke until Ruka turns up and yells at Sousuke not to touch "my Michiru".

After being raped by Sousuke, Michiru moves out of the ShareHouse and isolates herself from everyone else. She goes back to Choushi, where nine months later, she is about to give birth. However, complications arises when it is discovered she has abnormal high blood pressure that can endanger both her child and herself. She manages to pull through and names the child "Rumi", Ru from Ruka and Mi from Michiru. Ru is also present in Takeru.

Taeko Asano has stated that Michiru and Ruka were not based on Naoko Takeuchi's Sailor Moon characters Michiru and Haruka despite rumors.

Ruka Kishimoto (岸本瑠可, Kishimoto Ruka)

- Japanese Live action actor: Juri Ueno

A brilliant motocross racer, Ruka Kishimoto was Michiru's best friend since middle school. When she meets Michiru after four years, she is delighted yet worried about it. She dislikes people discriminating against gender, like her motocross senior does. She comments that when she is racing and in the air, "everything disappears" and "you become a thing floating in air" regardless of gender. Ruka lives in the Share House with Eri.

Her main problem throughout the series is confessing her love for Michiru. There are moments where it is obvious that Ruka loves Michiru, yet Michiru doesn't see it. Sousuke describes Ruka looking at Michiru with "male like eyes". Her relationship with Takeru is different. While Takeru loves Ruka, Ruka treats him like a friend. Her father even states that Takeru looks "weak", much to Ruka's amusement.

In the past, she and Michiru often got in trouble with the patrol man for riding together on a single seat bicycle. They would stay at a park where Michiru would confide to her about her family problems, and Ruka would stay with her because she "couldn't leave her in tears". Ruka graduated from high school in 2003.

Her motocross number is #27. While initially looked down upon by her male senior, Ruka eventually wins the Kanto Motocross Competition. Ueno started training for the motocross scenes in February, and she commented that the bike was really heavy as it weighs 90 kg.

Taeko Asano commented that Ueno Juri "changed" her image from the Nodame Cantabile hairstyle to Ruka's clothing and hair style right before rehearsal. Asano also commented that "she's a natural genius" and that she became "the character itself" because Ueno changed her habits of walking, talking and sitting to emulate Ruka's style, even when the camera's were not in action. Ueno stated that the role of "Ruka" was starting to have an effect on her.

Asano has also stated that Michiru and Ruka were not based on Naoko Takeuchi's Sailor Moon characters Michiru and Haruka despite rumors.

Takeru Mizushima (水島 タケル, Takeru Mizushima)

- Japanese Live action actor: Eita

A professional makeup and hair artist by day and a bartender by night, Takeru suffers from a trauma acquired during his childhood. As such, he is uncomfortable around women, except Ruka, whom he has fallen in love with. Many, including Eri at first, suspect him as gay because of his good looks yet the absence of a girlfriend.

When he was a child, his father was abusive but his mother remained by his side. His sister wanted an ally that would not betray her and used Takeru. It is not stated what happened between him and his step sister, but because of it, Takeru suffers from trauma and is afraid of a woman's body.

Takeru is injured badly because Sousuke thought he was the object of Michiru's affection. Due to the injury sustained, he loses his job.

However, when Michiru disappears, Takeru drags Ruka along to "fill her heart". They meet Michiru at the hospital after a minor accident, and after she gives birth, Takeru tells the baby that he will be the father.

Eri Takigawa (滝川 エリ, Takigawa Eri)

- Japanese Live action actor: Asami Mizukawa

An air stewardess, Eri is a happy go lucky woman who often finds herself miserable at love. She is the only original member of the ShareHouse other than Ruka prior to the main story. Eri loves to drink, and can speak various words in different languages due to her experience at work.

Eri often speaks whatever is on her mind, even guessing Ruka's feelings towards Michiru. When Ruka denies this, saying that she treats everyone fairly, Eri also denies her statement because she felt that she was treated differently although Eri is Ruka's housemate. She regrets that she didn't know about Ruka's GID issue until after Ruka wins the motocross race.

When Ogurin tells her that he is leaving for Milan due to a transfer, she gets angry with him for apologizing. However, when she goes to work, Ogurin turns up with a bunch of roses, asking her to marry him. She marries Ogurin despite him being good for nothing, insinuating that her love is enough for both of them. Both of them move out of the ShareHouse due to Ogurin's transfer to Italy, but return eventually after a year for a reunion.

Sousuke Oikawa (及川 宗佑, Oikawa Sousuke)

- Japanese Live action actor: Ryo Nishikido

Sousuke Oikawa is Michiru's boyfriend who works in the Children's Welfare department. He abuses Michiru and seems to suffer from multiple personalities, once slapping her then apologizing and hugging the next moment. He beats up Takeru as he mistakenly assumes that Takeru was the guy Ruka said that Michiru liked. Sousuke also nearly rapes Ruka, but Ruka manages to get away at the last minute by smashing a lamp into him.

The only relationship he has besides being Michiru's boyfriend is with a young boy who he rescues from an abusive parent. He saves the child's life from an oncoming train, breaking several of his bones in the process.

When he was 10, Sousuke was raised by various relatives after his mother ran away with a customer at the supermarket where she had worked. It is because of this that Sousuke wanted to marry Michiru and raise a happy family.

Sousuke commits suicide at the end of the series because he felt he could not give Michiru the happiness she found with the ShareHouse members. He writes her a letter, explaining his actions and how he understood that the only way to set Michiru free was to kill himself.

Masami Nagasawa, who played opposite Nishikido as Michiru, stated that "his type of acting is more difficult than mine. He also worries about me being hit accidentally."

=== Supporting characters ===
Tomohiko Ogura

- Japanese Live action actor: Shigenori Yamazaki

Tomohiko Ogura is Eri's senior at their workplace. He has an estranged relationship with his wife Eiko and decides to move into the ShareHouse while he finds a way to solve his problem. He is often called Ogurin. Ogurin is very cowardly sometimes, unable to stand up for himself or worry a lot about his wellbeing.

He realizes that he has been in love with Eri all along, and marries her. They both move out of the ShareHouse due to Ogurin's transfer to Italy, but return eventually after a year.

- Aki Nishihara as Reina Hiratsuka
- Rea Ranka as Sayuri Mita
- Sayaka Hirano as Mayumi Okabe
- Mitsuko Baisho as Chinatsu Aida

Michiru's mother, she is often drunk and very careless. She gambles and borrows money often, leading to financial burdens on Michiru. At the start of the drama, she finds a new lover which makes Michiru irritated. When Chinatsu needed money to pay of some debts, Sousuke offers her some and in return she tells him of Michiru's location.

- Takeru Shibuya as Naoya Higuchi
- Toshiyuki Kitami as Kenichiro Endo
- Yuko Ito as Yuko Shirahata

Takeru's sister. Their past is vaguely shown, but it is clear that she did something to Takeru which made him fear a woman's body.

- Tetsushi Tanaka as Kazumi Hayashida

Hayashida is Ruka's motocross senior. Often looking down on women, Hayashida believes that it is almost impossible for a woman to reach the speed and level of a male racer. He once tried to hit on her, but Ruka manages to ward him off.

- Mayumi Asaka as Yoko Kishimoto
- Mitsuru Hirata as Shuji Kishimoto
- Mitsuki Nagashima as Shogo Kishimoto

Shogo is Ruka's younger brother. The Kishimoto family is very supportive of Ruka.

== Setting ==
The drama takes place in modern-day Tokyo.

The ShareHouse is a house where members share the rent (40000 yen per person) amongst themselves. Takeru mentions to Chinatsu Aida that the house is shared among five people, but the full capacity is unknown. In the beginning, Ruka and Eri are the only members of the ShareHouse, but soon Takeru, Ogurin and Michiru move in as well. The members share the facilities, such as the toilet, kitchen and living room, but each of them have their own rooms. Eri lets Ogurin into her room at times.

The Inokashira Park is another notable setting. When Michiru and Ruka were in high school, they used to go to the park and spend time there. Michiru and Ruka reminisce about their high school days when they meet after four years. After Michiru was beaten up by Sousuke, Ruka finds her in the park. Ruka and Michiru reconcile here after Takeru arranges the meeting. The park also serves as the location where Michiru hides after discovering Ruka's secret.

== Media ==
=== Manga ===
The manga features Ruka and Michiru during their highschool days.

=== OST ===
- Name: Last Friends Original Soundtrack
- Release Date: June 11, 2008

An OST containing 21 different tracks have been produced. All songs were composed by Akio Izutsu except the last track.

Track	Title
1	イーチ·リビング (Each Living)
2	グッド·フェローズ (Good Fellows)
3	エターナル·コース (Eternal Course)
4	マインド·ベンダー (Mind Bender)
5	スパイラル·ハート (Spiral Heart)
6	オン·オフ (On Off)
7	ディア·フレンズ (Dear Friends)
8	インナー·サークル (Inner Circle)
9	レイジー·デイズ (Lazy Days)
10	リトル·シャイン (Little Shine)
11	ブラインド·リマインダー (Blind Reminder)
12	スナップ·ショット (Snapshot)
13	アイコール·ユアネーム (I Call Your Name)
14	メモリー·レイク (Memory Lake)
15	コールド·ブレイン (Cold Brain)
16	フレンド·シップ (Friendship)
17	ドロップ·モーション (Drop Motion)
18	シークレット·ポエッツ (Secret Poets)
19	ブランニュー·シーズン (Brand New Season)
20	レッド·ストリングス (Red Strings)
21	Prisoner Of Love Instrumental Version

=== DVD boxset ===
The series was released on October 15, 2008. Containing 6 discs, the boxset also includes extras, such as the mini series "Eri - My love" and other bonuses. The retail price for the set is 22800 yen without tax.

=== Others ===
The main cast members have appeared in the 2008 Spring Session of Waratte Iitomo. The Last Friends team scored a total 1330 points, the second last team in ranking. Juri Ueno, Asami Mizukawa and Ryo Nishikido were the three members who played the bow and arrow game, each scoring 100 points each. However, Ryo Nishikido's points were doubled to 200 because he had the golden arrow.

Masami Nagasawa, Juri Ueno and Eita appeared on Mentore G talk show on June 1, 2008. They talked about their roles and the program features their debut work, favourite hobbies and favourite food.

The May edition of the KazeRock magazine features Nagasawa, Ueno and Eita as rock band members.

Nagasawa and Ueno also appeared on Mezamashi TV for an interview. Eita commented that the two were really like Michiru and Ruka and kept holding hands. Nagasawa and Ueno insisted it was because both of them were nervous.

A pre finale radio interview was broadcast on June 15, 2008 at Masami Nagasawa's regular radio show. The interview took place at Odaiba's Wangan Studio and the guest were Ueno, Eita, Mizukawa and Yamazaki.

Ueno, Mizukawa and Eita all starred together in the live action series of Nodame Cantabile. Nagasawa commented during the pre-finale radio broadcast that the "Nodame Team" worked really well together.

The five cups made by Okaeri and used in the series run are available to be purchased.

== List of episodes ==
No.	Title	Rating (Kanto)	Original release date
1	Transliteration: "The troubles we keep to ourselves: DV, pregnancy, and forbidden love" (Japanese: 誰にも言えない悩み DV、妊娠、禁断愛)	13.9	April 10, 2008
The episode starts off with a pregnant Michiru at a port, wondering about her friends and a dreadful death which occurred. The story then starts with Michiru working in a beauty parlour and meeting her boyfriend Sosuke, who offers Michiru to move in together with him. The next day, Michiru is seen by Ruka while she is shopping for new furniture in accordance with moving in with Sosuke. The two meet for the first time in four years, and Ruka is delighted yet worried about the meeting. After that, Ruka meets Takeru at a junction, whom she can't remember despite bumping into him earlier that day in her rush to see Michiru. Eri brings Ruka to a bar where Takeru works, and they finally get to know each other. Sosuke accidentally mistakes Ruka for a guy when flicking through Michiru's cell phone, and slaps her. Michiru runs to a park which holds many memories of herself and Ruka during their high school days. Ruka, by instinct, meets her there and brings her back to the ShareHouse where Eri and Takeru welcome them. They all spend the night at the ShareHouse. In the morning, Ruka sees Michiru crying in her sleep and kisses her.
2	Transliteration: "A life-and-death secret" (Japanese: 命がけの秘密)	15.9	April 17, 2008
Ruka is worried about her upcoming Kanto Race. At work, Michiru is visited by Takeru who hands over a ticket for Ruka's Kanto race. Michiru is fearful of Sousuke after he nearly forces her to cut his hair no matter what the cost. Seemingly satisfied with Michiru's promise not to cut men's hair, Sousuke allows Michiru to go to Ruka's race. Ruka gets injured during the motocross race. When she wakes up, she finds herself at the hospital with Michiru and Takeru. Later she overhears a conversation between Sousuke and Michiru, the former reacting violently to Michiru's prolonged stay at the hospital. As Sousuke is about to hit Michiru with a chair, Ruka rushes in, abandoning her crutches and places herself between Sousuke and Michiru, warning Sousuke not to touch "my Michiru".
3	Transliteration: "A love that eats life away" (Japanese: 命を削る想い)	15.6	April 24, 2008
Michiru is told not to see Ruka again. However, Michiru disobeys by meeting up with Ruka in the middle of the night. When Sousuke finds out the next day and tells Michiru not to see Ruka anymore, she gets mad and stands up to him. When Michiru mentions not to say anything bad to "my Ruka", Sousuke is provoked and Michiru is beaten up badly. Arriving at the ShareHouse on the point of unconsciousness, Michiru falls into Ruka's arms, shaken from her abuse.
4	Transliteration: "A bond torn apart" (Japanese: 引き裂かれた絆)	15.9	May 1, 2008
Michiru stays at the ShareHouse after her abuse. Elsewhere, Sousuke tries to track down the location of Michiru. At dinner, Eri teases Ruka's behaviour towards Michiru is like that of lovers. Ruka vehemently denies this. After Ruka's motocross practice, she notices she is being followed by Sousuke. Requesting her senpai to follow her to dinner, Ruka accidentally trips over and her senpai uses this as an opportunity to harass her. Shocked by her own weakness, Ruka pushes her senpai and runs to the bar where Takeru works. She breaks down in front of Takeru, who comforts her. The next day, Michiru's mother requests that Michiru visits her. However, it is a ploy by Sousuke to figure out where Michiru is. Ruka instead shows up to hand over some cash. When Ruka returns home, she is followed by Sousuke, who demands to see Michiru. Ruka steps in and says she won't allow it, and Sousuke waits in the rain. At morning, when Michiru takes out the rubbish, she sees Sousuke and immediately rushes to his aid. Unbeknownst to her, Ruka is watching everything.
5	Transliteration: "A night of shock" (Japanese: 衝撃の一夜)	19.9	May 8, 2008
Michiru takes Sousuke back to his apartment. He has caught a terrible cold and is bedridden. When she returns to the ShareHouse, she announces that she is going to work in Niche again. Eri gives her a key to the ShareHouse, telling her that she is a member of their group. The next day, Ruka invites Takeru and Michiru to her family house for a party. Ruka's family is impressed that Ruka invited Takeru because such a thing has never happened before, much to Ruka's annoyance. Ogurin and Eri are supposedly on a "date" but actually they are outside Ogurin's house, where plans to divorce his wife. Being too weak however, Ogurin stays the night at his place while Eri goes back to the ShareHouse. Ruka and Michiru stay the night while Takeru goes back home to find a semi drunken Eri. Takeru's fear of a woman is seen when Eri tries to seduce him. Michiru and Ruka talk about their past. At Ruka's next race, Michiru receives a call from Sousuke. She initially refuses to answer it, but relents at Ruka's celebration party. Sousuke tells her that he is going to commit suicide and Michiru runs out of the pub only to be confronted by Ruka. Upset by the fact that Michiru isn't strong enough, Ruka lets her go. Upon arriving at Sousuke's apartment, Michiru sees Sousuke alive but is shocked to see her graduation album burning.
6	Transliteration: "A desperate gateaway" (Japanese: 命がけの逃避行)	17.2	May 15, 2008
At the ShareHouse, Takeru, Eri and a semi-druken Ruka are shocked to see Ogurin, who came back after a long argument with his wife. Ruka gets angry at him, but Eri leaves it as it is. When Michiru hasn't made an appearance to any of the ShareHouse members since she left the pub after Ruka's race, Takeru goes to the beauty parlour and finds out that Michiru has resigned. Ruka appears to not care about Michiru at all, but she admits to herself that the only reason why she doesn't look at Michiru eye to eye is because she would want to look at her forever. The next day, Eri forces Ruka to walk with her to the station so that she could talk to her. Eri guesses the harsh treatment from Ruka towards Michiru is because Ruka truly loves Michiru. Ruka avoids her, instead countering with her own question on why Eri allows Ogurin into her room. Eri replies it's because she cannot forever not forgive Ogurin. Takeru calls Ruka at the gym, and requests her to come to the park to fix his bike. Ruka gets suspicious, and when she starts to test the two seater bicycle, Michiru hops on and starts cycling. The three spend a peaceful afternoon at the park. Later, Ruka discovers that her family received a threatening letter from Sousuke. She denies his claims, and goes back to the ShareHouse. Upon arriving, she decides to go out again. Takeru catches up with her, and Ruka feels the urge to tell him about herself. Just as she is about to, Takeru tells her he likes her.
7	Transliteration: "A harsh reality" (Japanese: 残酷な現実)	16.0	May 22, 2008
Eri spots Ogurin with his wife at the airport. Sousuke gets injured while protecting a kid. Ruka is angry at Takeru for trying to interfere with her problems. When the kid shows up with a letter for Michiru, Ruka makes Eri promise not to give it to Michiru. Eri instead goes to the hospital and confronts Sousuke, but is shocked to find out that he has written dozens of letter for Michiru. She takes all the letters, but doesn't give it to Michiru.
8	Transliteration: "Last letter" (Japanese: 最後の手紙)	18.8	May 29, 2008
Ruka decides to move out of the ShareHouse to Fussa due to the anguish she feels by not telling everyone else about her true self. She attempts to leave early, but Michiru insist on walking to the park at least. There, they talk about their past and Ruka says that it is time to leave. Takeru finds a letter in the ShareHouse from Ruka, explaining her problems and why she trusts him. He runs, and meets Ruka just in time at the park. Takeru explains that he will support Ruka no matter what, and runs to hug her. Ruka, relieved at the thought that somebody finally understands her, returns the hug. Michiru misinterprets this as a sign that Ruka and Takeru are in a relationship.
9	Transliteration: "Your life" (Japanese: 君の命)	18.0	June 5, 2008
Everybody is worried about Ruka's race, as if she wins she will make it into the Final Round. She wins, and the rest of the ShareHouse members open up a champagne to celebrate. Ruka arrives the next day at the ShareHouse to celebrate her win. The next morning, Takeru's sister turns up but leaves before he wakes up. Michiru and Takeru then go visit Michiru's mother, however it is discovered that Chinatsu has made contact with Sousuke already and owes him a debt. On their way back, Michiru visits the department store and is shocked to see Sousuke. She tells him to leave her alone as she likes someone. Sousuke interprets the person to be Takeru, and Takeru ends up badly injured. Ruka goes to Sousuke's apartment to tell him off about the letters he had been circulating and to leave Michiru alone. Sousuke asks whether it was Ruka's plan all along to interfere with his and Michiru's relationship. Ruka replies that it wasn't, and tells Sousuke flatly that the love he has for Michiru isn't real love. Sousuke is puzzled, and ask Ruka how can she say so. Ruka finally admits that the one who truly loves Michiru is herself, and a fight between both of them ensues.
10	Transliteration: "Love and death" (Japanese: 最終章·愛と死)	20.7	June 12, 2008
After nearly getting raped by Sousuke, Ruka rushes to a department store to buy a new shirt. The day proceeds as normal, until Michiru overhears Ruka's conversation with Takeru. Shocked with Ruka's confession of love, Michiru leaves the ShareHouse. When Michiru returns to Sousuke's apartment to collect her things, she finds Ruka's good luck charm and demands to know what happen to Ruka. Sousuke smugly replies that he "broke her pride". Just as Michiru is about to leave, Sousuke grabs and rapes her. Afterwards, Sousuke finds the photos Michiru has along with the ShareHouse members, looking happier than ever. Michiru tells Sousuke that she will stay with him as long as he doesn't hurt any more of her friends. He decides to kill himself because he cannot give Michiru that happiness.
11	Transliteration: "To the future" (Japanese: 未来へ)	22.8; 25.9 (Ending)	June 19, 2008
Sousuke commits suicide. Ogurin and Eri gets married. When Ruka and Takeru are left alone at the ShareHouse, Takeru drags Ruka along to find the whereabouts of Michiru. After a minor motorcycle accident, they find Michiru at the hospital. They learn that Michiru is pregnant, as well as living independently in a ryokan. When Michiru gets a contraction, they immediately rush to the hospital. Complications arises as Michiru has high blood pressure and might not live, yet she pulls through and delivers the baby. Ruka is the first to hold Rumi and Takeru declares he is "papa". The series ends with Ruka, Michiru and Takeru at a beach each enjoying each other's presence.
Special
12	Transliteration: "The love of young people who live the moment" (Japanese: スペシャルアンコール特別編総集編に新撮シーンも加え再編集!今を生きる若者達の愛)	17.4	June 26, 2008
Set after a year of Sousuke's death, this special consist of a recap of the entire series and features what happens to the ShareHouse members. Ogurin and Eri have returned from Milan, Michiru visits Sousuke's grave, Takeru's sister calls and Ruka appears after her practice. The special ends with a reunion dinner and all the ShareHouse members cheering for their future.

== Reception ==
Last Friends was number 1 on Fuji's top 50 list during its run. However, it had since dropped to 6th place after the broadcast of the special and as of the week of July 7 to 13, Last Friends ranked 9 on the Top 50 list. The series have subsequently dropped to the 15th place and then the 16th place as of the week July 21 to 27. From July 27 to August 3, Last Friends ranked 19 and then moved up to 18 at August 10.

In the first quarter of 2008, Yahoo word search ranking placed Last Friends 1st on the list.

Oricon Style had a poll for the female audience's favorite actor and actress right after Last Friends finished its run. Ueno was voted 1st, while Nagasawa was tied with two others at 6th place. Eita tied in 4th position.

Last Friends came second in the "Best Drama" at the 12th Nikkan Sports Drama Grand Prix. Juri Ueno won "Best Supporting Actress" while Ryo Nishikido won "Best Supporting Actor." Masami Nagasawa tied in fourth place for "Best Actress" while Eita also came fourth in the "Best Supporting Actor" category.

In the 57th Television Drama Academy Awards, Last Friends won as Best Drama. Masami Nagasawa won the 3rd Best Actress award. Juri Ueno won as Best Supporting Actress, while Ryo Nishikido won the Best Supporting Actor award. Both Ueno and Nishikido won with straight sets from the fans, journalists and critics. Eita was the runner up in the Best Supporting Actor category. Last Friends was also awarded the Best Script, Best Director and the Best Theme Song for Hikaru Utada's "Prisoner of Love".

== Awards ==
Year	Ceremony	Category/Recipient	Result
2008-2009	57th Television Drama Academy Awards	Best Drama Series	Won
2008-2009	57th Television Drama Academy Awards	Best Supporting Actor (Ryo Nishikido)	Won
2008-2009	57th Television Drama Academy Awards	Best Supporting Actress (Juri Ueno)	Won
2008-2009	57th Television Drama Academy Awards	Best Directors (Endo Mitsutaka/Moriwaki Tomonobu/Miyaki Shogo)	Won
2008-2009	57th Television Drama Academy Awards	Best Screenplay (Taeko Asano)	Won
2008-2009	57th Television Drama Academy Awards	Best Theme Song (Prisoner of Love by Hikaru Utada)	Won
2008-2009	12th Nikkan Sports Drama Grand Prix	Best Supporting Actress (Juri Ueno)	Won
2008-2009	12th Nikkan Sports Drama Grand Prix	Best Supporting Actor (Ryo Nishikido)	Won
2008-2009	1st International Drama Festival in Tokyo	Best Youth Drama	Won
2008-2009	1st International Drama Festival in Tokyo	Best Actress (Juri Ueno)	Won
2008-2009	18th TV Life Annual Drama Awards	Best Supporting Actor (Ryo Nishikido)	Won
2008-2009	18th TV Life Annual Drama Awards	Best Supporting Actress (Juri Ueno)	Won
2008-2009	5th TV Navi's Drama of the Year Annual Awards	Best Supporting Actress (Juri Ueno)	Won
2008-2009	5th TV Navi's Drama of the Year Annual Awards	Best Supporting Actor (Eita)	Won
