= Yuko Takeda =

Japanese television announcer

- 武田 祐子
- Born: 29 May 1970 (age 55); Yamagata, Yamagata, Japan
- Other names: Yuko Shimizu (real name)
- Education: Yamagata University Faculty of Science Biology
- Years active: 1994–
- Employer: Fuji Television Organization Department Announcement Department (1994–2017)
- Television: FNN Super News Weekend; Doyō Ichiban! Hanayashiki; Mezamashi TV (Kyō no Wanko narration); Hapifuru!; New Weekly Critique On Fuji Television; Sport! (Saturday narration); GameCenter CX (narration); Uma no Ōji-sama (narration); Shiritagari! (narration); Ageru TV (narration); Goody! Good Day!

Yuko Takeda (武田 祐子, Takeda Yūko; born 29 May 1970) is a former Fuji Television announcer (at the time of retirement Deputy Director General of the announcement room). She was born in Yamagata, Yamagata. Her real name is Yuko Shimizu (清水祐子, Shimizu Yūko; née Takeda (武田)).

== Biography, personal life ==
She graduated from Yamagata University Kindergarten, Elementary School Attached to Yamagata University, Junior High School Attached to Yamagata University, and Yamagata Prefectural Yamagata Nishi High School. She became a player of rhythmic gymnastics in high school. After graduating from Yamagata University Faculty of Science Biology, she joined Fuji Television as an announcer in 1994.

She appeared in FNN Super Time (as weather caster), Anata no Tokyo, Big Today, Ohayō! Nice Day, Doyō Ichiban! Hanayashiki, Waratte Iitomo!, Mezamashi Tenki, FNN Super News Weekend as a caster (from April 2000 to 1 October 2006), New Weekly Critique On Fuji Television, Moshimo Tours (as narrator), GameCenter CX (as narrator), etc.

In Moshimo Tours, her animation voices unfamiliar to station analysts became a topic, and even in many variety shows after that, the narration of MoshiTsua-fū was spread.

From 2007 to 2013 she is in charge of the narration of Uma no Ōji-sama. She showed off the seven colours, such as using different horses' voices properly. Especially her "Ponio"'s fascinating voice became a reputation.

She handle a lot of narrations of documentaries as well as character voices of variety shows. She received the FNS Announcement Grand Prize at The Nonfiction "Real Tracking Document: People Mourning in the Tamagawa River" broadcast in 2015. In addition, the 2016 broadcast of The Nonfiction "Failure is Not a Failure" received the Galaxy Award Encouragement Prize.

She appeared on the film Swing Girls (released in 2004) as a television announcer. In Yamagata Prefecture's stage work, she also conducted a dialectic instruction for the script (However, due to reasons such as too strong an accent it was decided to change to Yonezawa dialect and another person did the direction dialling). In addition, in the DVD of the film Gege released in the same year, she was in charge of narration for the visually impaired.

She is a fan of the manga artist Mitsuru Yaku, and often draws the character "Otake-san" also in the yonkoma manga.

Tetsu and Tomo's Tomo Tomoyuki Ishizawa is her classmate from kindergarten to junior high school.

Theatre director, playwright, and actor Hirohito Gotō is her senior at primary school and middle school.

In February 2002, she married director and colleague Hiroyoshi Shimizu. Also her nephew Seiji Takeda joined as assistant director in 2001 (now her husband's subordinates).

She is good at palmistry. She showed it off at Ana Ban!, called "Odaiba's Mother".

Her pregnancy turned out on 11 March 2011. She entered a prenatal postpartum vacation from October the same year. New Weekly Critique On Fuji Television who served as a moderator took the baton to Kikue Nishiyama, and in Moshimo Tours who had served as a narration since 2002, was replaced on 1 October broadcasting by Kanako Yanagihara. On the evening of 9 November the same year, she gave birth to a boy who is her first child at a hospital in Tokyo.

She returned to work in April 2013. On the nationwide information programme Ageru TV broadcast from 1 to 27 September, she was in charge of the voice of the program character "Agerun".

On the 16 March 2017 broadcast of GameCenter CX she announced that she would retire from Fuji Television on 31 March (together, a regular descendant). As a free announcer from April, she belong to her affiliated office and works as an individual.

== Current programmes ==
- Datsuryoku News Network
- Neko no Eiga Kan
- GameCenter CX (narration – 16 Mar 2017, after that, she became irregular)

== Former programmes ==
- FNN Super News Weekend (from Apr 1999 to Mar 2000 sports section, from Apr 2000 to Sep 2006 main casters)
- Hapifuru
- Mezamashi Tenki
- Haretara Ī'!
- Umanari-kun (narration)
- Doyō Ichiban! Hanayashiki
- Mezamashi TV ("Kyō no Wanko" narration, announcer Kikue Nishiyama's maternity representation, from 3 Sep 2007 to 30 Sep 2008)
- Weekly Critique On Fuji Television
- New Weekly Critique On Fuji Television
- Fuji Ana Studio: Marunama (24 Sep 2011)
- Sport! (Saturday narration)
- Uma no Ōji-sama (narration)
- Moshimo Tours (narration)
- Shiritagari ("Kyoko Sasaki's Way to 'Housewives'" narration)
- Kanzaburō ga Naita! Kantarō Kyoshiki & Kandō Hiwa: Sayonara Kabukiza SP (narration)
- Ageru TV (1 Apr – 27 Sep 2013, Weekdays) in the voice of "Agurun", she was in charge of Navigator of "Marumise Cruise" (video interview special feature section)
- Isshūki Tokubetsu Bangumi: Kanzaburō: Saigo no Kotoba (7 Dec 2013, narration)
- Goody! Good Day!
- The Nonfiction

== Synchronous with ==
- Ayako Kisa (currently freelance announcer)
- Mizuki Sano
- Miki Tominaga (currently freelance announcer)
- Taku Watanabe (One-Night Rock'n Roll director)
- Daisuke Sekiguchi (films Swing Girls and Gege producer)
