= Town of Evening Calm, Country of Cherry Blossoms =

Japanese manga series

- Cover of the first tankōbon edition of the manga, published by Futabasha

夕凪の街 桜の国 (Yūnagi no machi, Sakura no kuni)
- Genre: Historical, Drama
- Manga
- Written by: Fumiyo Kōno
- Published by: Futabasha
- English publisher: NA/UK: Last Gasp
- Magazine: Weekly Manga Action
- Original run: September 2003 – July 2004
- Volumes: 1
- Audio drama
- Directed by: Kenji Shindo
- Produced by: Shinya Aoki
- Written by: Hirofumi Harada
- Music by: Jun Nagao
- Station: NHK
- Released: 5 August 2006
- Novel
- Written by: Kei Kunii
- Published by: Futabasha
- Published: 3 July 2007
- Novel
- Written by: Yohei Makita
- Published by: Futabasha
- Published: 22 July 2007
- Live-action film

Yunagi City, Sakura Country
- Directed by: Kiyoshi Sasabe
- Produced by: Junichi Matsushita
- Written by: Kiyoshi Sasabe; Katsura Kunii
- Music by: Takatsugu Muramatsu
- Released: 28 July 2007
- Runtime: 118 minutes
- Live-action television film

Yunagi no Machi, Sakura no Kuni 2018
- Directed by: Ritsutoki Kumano
- Produced by: Yoshisumi Tanaka; Akihisa Koike
- Written by: Nao Morishita
- Music by: Yohei Kobayashi
- Studio: NHK Hiroshima Broadcasting Station
- Original network: NHK General TV
- Released: 6 August 2018
- Runtime: 73 minutes

Town of Evening Calm, Country of Cherry Blossoms (Japanese: 夕凪の街 桜の国, Hepburn: Yūnagi no Machi, Sakura no Kuni) is a one-volume manga written and illustrated by Fumiyo Kōno. The two connected stories were first published in Japan by Futabasha in Weekly Manga Action in 2003 and 2004, then collected in a single tankōbon volume in 2004. The story is about a family of survivors of the atomic bombing of Hiroshima. The author based the characters on people who were in Hiroshima or Nagasaki.

Town of Evening Calm, Country of Cherry Blossoms was adapted as a live-action film directed by Kiyoshi Sasabe released in 2007, called Yunagi City, Sakura Country in English. It has also been adapted as a 2006 radio drama, as 2007 novels by Kei Kunii and Yohei Makita, as a 2017 stage play and as a 2018 television special.

The manga has received international praise for its simple but beautiful artwork and its quiet but "humane" anti-war message. It received the Grand Prize for manga at the 2004 Japan Media Arts Festival and the 2005 Tezuka Osamu Cultural Prize Creative Award. Kumiko Asō won several acting awards for her portrayal of Minami Hirano, one of the two protagonists, in the film adaptation.

== Plot ==
Town of Evening Calm, Country of Cherry Blossoms comprises two stories, "Town of Evening Calm" and "Country of Cherry Blossoms".

=== Family tree ===
- Hirano Tenma (c. 1905–7 August 1945) m. Fujimi (c. 1907–27 August 1987)
  - Kasumi (c. 1930–11 October 1945)
  - Minami (c. 1932–8 September 1955)
  - Midori (c. 1933–6 August 1945)
  - Ishikawa Asahi (b. 1937) m. Ota Kyoka (1945–1983)
    - Nanami (b. 1976)
    - Nagio (b. 1977 or 1978)

=== Town of Evening Calm (Yūnagi no Machi) ===
Set in Hiroshima in 1955, ten years after the atomic bomb was dropped, "Town of Evening Calm" is the story of a young woman, Minami Hirano, who survived the bomb when she was in her early teens. She lives with her mother, Fujimi, in a shanty-town near downtown, having lost her father and two sisters to the bomb; her younger brother, Asahi, was evacuated to Mito, Ibaraki, where he was adopted by his aunt. Fujimi is a seamstress while Minami, who is "all thumbs" as her mother puts it, works as a clerk in an office, and together they are saving money for the trip to Mito to visit Asahi.

One of her co-workers, Yutaka Uchikoshi, cares for Minami and visits her shanty when she misses work because her mother is sick. He later gives her a pair of sandals made by his mother and a handkerchief, but when he tries to kiss her, she has a flashback where she sees the victims of the bombing where they now stand and pushes him away. She runs off, still reliving the horrors of the attack, including finding her little sister's blackened body and watching her older sister die of radiation poisoning two months later. The next day at the office, she apologizes to Uchikoshi, saying she wants to somehow put the past behind her. She spends the day exhausted, however, and the next day becomes bedridden from the long-term effects of radiation poisoning. As Minami's condition worsens, she is visited by Uchikoshi and other co-workers, and dies just as her brother and aunt arrive.

=== Country of Cherry Blossoms (Sakura no Kuni) ===
"Country of Cherry Blossoms" is a story in two parts. Part one is set in 1987 in Tokyo. At the start of fifth grade, Nanami Ishikawa, the daughter of Minami's brother Asahi (and thus second-generation atomic bomb victim), is a tomboy nicknamed "Goemon" by her classmates, to her disgust. At baseball practice, she gets a bloody nose after being hit by a ball, after which she skips practice to visit her brother Nagio in the hospital, where he is being treated for asthma. On the way, she meets her best friend and next-door neighbor, a feminine girl named Toko Tone, who loans her subway fare and accompanies her. In Nagio's hospital room, they toss cherry blossom petals that Nanami collected into the air, to give him the experience of spring that he's missing. Nanami is scolded by her grandmother for visiting Nagio when she's not supposed to. That summer, her grandmother, Asahi's mother, Fujimi, dies, and that fall Nanami loses touch with Toko after her family moves closer to Nagio's hospital.

Part two takes place 17 years later, in 2004. Nanami, now working as an office lady, lives with her recently retired father. One day Nagio, who recently graduated from medical school, tells Nanami he ran into Toko as a nurse at the hospital where he is interning. Nanami tells him she's worried their father's going senile because he has started wandering off for a couple days at a time without explanation.

One evening, Nanami follows Asahi as he leaves the apartment, and while she tails him runs into Toko and together they follow him onto an overnight bus to Hiroshima. In the morning, they follow as he visits several people before Toko leaves to visit the Peace Park. Asahi visits his family grave, then sits by the riverside, and while waiting Nanami discovers in the pocket of Toko's borrowed jacket a letter from Nagio to Toko, saying that her family asked him to stop seeing her as they believe his asthma is a result of the atomic bomb.

In a flashback, Asahi recalls the riverbank as a shantytown, then remembers meeting Kyoka Ota, a neighborhood girl his mother hired to help her after Minami died, when he returns to Hiroshima to start college. Asahi begins tutoring Kyoka because her teachers believe she is stupid due to the atomic bomb. When Toko finds Nanami by the river, Toko is upset to the point of illness by what she saw at the Peace Memorial Museum, and Nanami finds them a hotel room and cares for her, even though she has flashbacks to seeing her mother's last illness when she was a young child. In another flashback, Asahi proposes to a grown Kyoka, against his mother's wishes, as Kyoka was exposed to the bomb.

On the ride back to Tokyo, Nanami arranges for Nagio to meet her and Toko, then leaves them alone together. Asahi tells Nanami he visited Hiroshima for the 49th anniversary of Minami's death, and that Nanami resembles her.

== Development ==
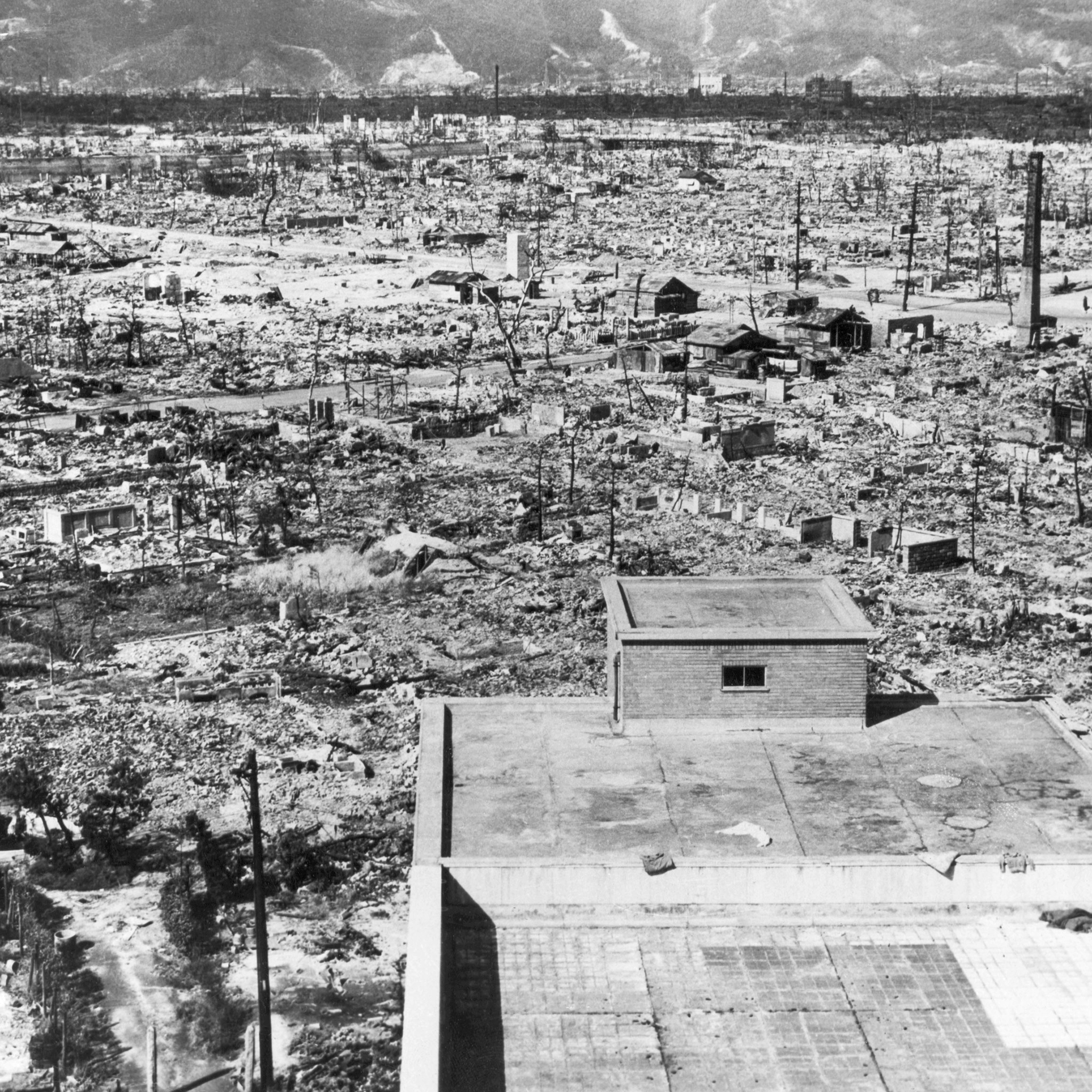
The effects of atomic bombing on Hiroshima

According to Fumiyo Kōno's afterword, she was prompted to write Town of Evening Calm, Country of Cherry Blossoms when her editor asked her for a Hiroshima story. She was initially reluctant because, while she was born in Hiroshima neither she nor anyone in her family was a survivor of the atomic bomb, and growing up she found the subject upsetting and had tried to avoid it ever since. She decided to tackle the subject because she felt it was "unnatural and irresponsible for me to consciously try to avoid the issue." Living in Tokyo, she had come to realize that people outside of Hiroshima and Nagasaki didn't know about the effects of the bomb, not because they were avoiding the subject but because it is never talked about, and so she attempted the story because "drawing something is better than drawing nothing at all."

Kōno described "Country of Cherry Blossoms" as "what I most needed to hear two years ago, when I still avoided anything to do with the atomic bomb."

== Media ==
=== Manga ===
Town of Evening Calm, Country of Cherry Blossoms was serialized in Japan by Futabasha in two parts in the seinen (aimed at younger adult men) manga magazine Weekly Manga Action in September 2003 and July 2004. The two serial numbers were collected in a tankōbon edition published on 12 October 2004 (ISBN 4-575-29744-5). It was reprinted in a bunkoban edition on 8 April 2008 (ISBN 978-4-575-71343-5).

It has been published in English by Last Gasp, in Korean by Munhak Segye Sa, in Traditional Chinese by Sharp Point Press, in French by Kana as Country of Cherry (French: Le Pays des Cerisiers), in Portuguese by Editora JBC as Hiroshima – A City of Calm (Portuguese: Hiroshima – A Cidade da Calmaria), in Spanish by Glènat España and in Russian by Alt Graph.

=== Radio drama ===
The story was adapted as a 50-minute radio drama broadcast by NHK on 5 August 2006. It won the 2006 Agency for Cultural Affairs Art Festival Award in the Radio Division, and was shortlisted for the 2007 Prix Italia.

The drama was directed by Kenji Shindo and produced by Shinya Aoki, with the script adapted by Hirofumi Harada. Music was provided by Jun Nagao, and sounds were provided by Ai Sato. The three lead actors were Isao Natsuyagi, Tomoko Saito, and Kayu Suzuki. Kenji Anan was a supporting cast member.

Cast

- Isao Natsuyagi as Asahi Ishikawa
- Kayu Suzuki as Nanami Ishikawa
- Tomoko Saito as Minami Hirano
- Kenji Anan as Yutaka Uchikoshi
- Toshie Kobayashi as Fujimi Hirano
- Shin Yazawa as Toko Tone
- Kenta Chabana as younger Asahi Ishikawa
- Yuna Mimura as younger Kyoka Ota
- Yukie Ito as Kyoka Ota
- Kanako Obayashi as Sachiko Furuta

=== Novels ===
Two novelizations were released in conjunction with the film adaptation in 2007. A novelization of the film by Kei Kunii (国井 桂, Kunii Kei), with a cover featuring the film's actors, was published by Futabasha on 3 July (ISBN 978-4-575-23582-1). A novelization of the manga by Yohei Makita (蒔田陽平, Makita Yohei) was published by Futabasha on 22 July (ISBN 978-4-575-24046-7).

=== Film ===
Town of Evening Calm, Country of Cherry Blossoms has been adapted into a live-action film directed by Kiyoshi Sasabe, which is called Yunagi City, Sakura Country in English. The outdoor sets were filmed in Kawaguchi, Saitama, including a recreation of part of the Hiroshima's shantytown c. 1958. The story of "Country of Cherry Blossoms" was filmed in Hiroshima. The film premiered at the Cannes Film Festival in May 2007, then released in theaters in Japan on 28 July 2007. It was released on DVD in Japan on 28 March 2008. A soundtrack was also released.

==== Key items ====
- An attractive handmade short-sleeved dress: there is the reason that Minami can't wear the short-sleeves.
- The white barrette (hair clip): Minami's father gave white one to Minami's sister Midori and red one to Minami, and soon Midori liked red one so Minami keep the white one. And the barrette will be kept by her sister in law Kyoka and her niece Nanami.
- The river and an old water tank for fire fighting on the street: People at the time wanted water.
- A white handkerchief with two red goldfish: The family used live in a house with a pond in the yard. Asahi tried to catch the goldfish and was scolded by father.
- A family picture: Only one Minami's family picture is left with Asahi in Mito, but all pictures were burn out with Minami's house.
- An acacia-tree on the river side: Asahi and Yutaka will meet under the acacia-tree. People in Hiroshima, they take care left standing a-bombed trees now, because Hiroshima was called "the city where no plants can be grown for seventy-five years".
- The name of the characters: Their names come from the name of the towns in Hiroshima. (Nagio from Yūnagi (Evening Calm)).
- Dialects: Minami, Fujimi, Kyoka and Yutaka speaks Hiroshima dialect. Asahi speaks Mito dialect. Nanami, Nagio and Toko speaks Tokyo dialect.

==== Cast ====
- Kumiko Asō as Minami Hirano, the heroine of "Town of Evening Calm". Minami lives in Hiroshima with her mother Fujimi. She wears a white barrette, a memento of her father and sister. Minami eventually dies as a result of radiation sickness.
- Rena Tanaka as Nanami Ishikawa, Minami's niece and the heroine of "Country of Cherry Blossoms". Nanami grew up in Tokyo and speaks the Tokyo dialect, unlike the Hiroshima-dwelling characters of Town of Evening Calm who speak in the local dialect. Throughout the story, Nanami learns the family history of her relatives in Hiroshima.
- Mitsunori Isaki as the younger Asahi Ishikawa, Minami's little brother. Asahi lives with his aunt in Mito, where he was raised, and thus speaks in the Mito dialect. He and his aunt lives far away from Minami and her mother, only arriving in Hiroshima to visit as her illness finally claims her life. After Minami's death, he decides to stay with his mother Fujimi in Hiroshima and attends Hiroshima University.
- Masaaki Sakai as the adult Asahi Ishikawa, Minami's brother and Nanami's father. When Nanami follows him, she discovers he has returned to Hiroshima for the fiftieth anniversary of Minami's death.
- Yû Yoshizawa as the younger Yutaka Uchikoshi, Minami's coworker who falls in love with her. She refuses his affections, but he stays by her side as she dies of radiation sickness.
- Ryosei Tayama as the adult Yutaka Uchikoshi. Yutaka and Asahi meet under the acacia tree when Asahi returns to Hiroshima.
- Shiho Fujimura as Fujimi Hirano, Minami's mother and Nanami's grandmother, who appears in both stories.
- Yuta Kanai as Nagio Ishikawa, Nanami's younger brother, who works as an intern at a hospital. He has feelings for Toko.
- Noriko Nakagoshi as Toko Tone, Nanami's childhood friend who works as a nurse in the same hospital as Nagio.
- Rina Koike as the young Kyoka Ota, a girl from Minami's neighborhood who sometimes visits to help out around the house.
- Urara Awata as Kyoka Ota, Nanami's mother. She and Asahi move from Hiroshima to Tokyo after their marriage.
- Asami Katsura as Sachiko Furuta, Minami's coworker who helps her make a copy of the dress in the shop window.

==== Soundtrack ====
The soundtrack of the film was released on 16 July 2007. It is composed by Takatsugu Muramatsu, with performances on the harp by Naori Uchida and harmonica by Masami Ohishi.

=== Stage ===
A stage adaptation by Stray Dog Promotion, written and directed by Toshiyuki Morioka, was performed from August to September 2017. It was re-performed in Augusts of 2019 and 2021.

=== TV special ===
NHK Hiroshima's 90th anniversary drama Yunagi no Machi, Sakura no Kuni 2018 was produced as a regional drama by NHK Hiroshima Broadcasting Station, and was released as a "special drama" on NHK General TV on 6 August 2018 and rebroadcast on 14 October. It was directed by Ritsutoki Kumano and written by Nao Morishita.

While keeping the setting of "Town of Evening Calm" as is, the 2004 setting of "Country of Cherry Blossoms II" was moved to 2018, and the characters were also aged by 14 years. The role of accompanying Nanami to Hiroshima in pursuit of Asahi was replaced by Fuko, Nagio and Toko's daughter, and Toko does not appear in this work because "Country of Cherry Blossoms I" was cut.

==== Cast ====
Heisei

- Nanami Ishikawa – Takako Tokiwa
- Asahi Ishikawa – Isao Hashizume
- Fuko Ishikawa – Yuna Taira
- Nagio Ishikawa – Satoshi Kashiwabara
- Yuji Daimon – Shosuke Tanihara
- Sachiko Furuta – Tayo Iwamoto
- Akira Uchikoshi – Mitsuo Sagawa

Showa

- Minami Hirano – Rina Kawaei
- Hirano Fujimi – Midoriko Kimura
- Sachiko Furuta – Masa Murasaki
- Akira Uchikoshi – Asuka Kudo
- Kyoka Ota – Fuka Koshiba (childhood – Shinyo Nemoto)
- Asahi Ishikawa – Yosuke Asari

== Reception ==
The story was praised by the award jury of the Japan Media Arts Festival for its brevity and its "depiction of 'the dark shadow of war'". According to Izumi Evers, one of the editors of the English edition, the Japanese edition created a sensation despite being little-promoted because it made readers want to talk about the bombing of Hiroshima, which is a controversial topic. The manga sold over 180,000 copies in Japan.

The simple artwork and story's "light, ephemeral touch" was praised by Dirk Deppey in The Comics Journal, and PopCultureShock called the character designs "slightly rough, clumsy", which they consider makes the characters "more human and more believable" because they are "more vulnerable, more imperfect, more fragile". PopCultureShock also praised the background art, which "bring[s] the streets of Hiroshima to vivid life". Manga News described the apparently simplistic art as beautiful, which emphasizes the story's depth without ever going over-the-top or into excess morality. Comic World News called the story "humane" and "profoundly moral", and praised the characterization as being "real". Otaku USA described the scenes of daily life as "welcoming" and the art "lovely", saying the "antiwar message is unspoken, and comes naturally from the desire not to see the characters die." A review at About.com described it as a "deeply moving story" that's "told in whispers rather than screams," and praised Kōno for resisting "the urge to pile on the melodrama" and so conveying "a deeply moving story." Manga: The Complete Guide called the work "a beautiful manga and an understated antiwar statement", praising its "dreamlike and evocative" stories and its artwork, especially the "lovely" backgrounds.

Publishers Weekly named the English translation one of the best ten manga of 2007, calling it "too important to pass up" and comparing it to Barefoot Gen, and New York Magazine named it one of the top five comics in English of 2007. The American Library Association placed the manga on its list of "Great Graphic Novels for Teens 2008". It was nominated for an Eisner Award in two categories, Best Short Story for "Town of Evening Calm" and Best U.S. Edition of International Material—Japan, but lost to "Mr. Wonderful" by Dan Clowes and Tekkonkinkreet respectively.

According to Patrick Macias, an English editor of the manga, the film was "kind of ignored" at Cannes because of competition from other high-profile Japanese films. According to a review in Asia Pacific Arts, during the sequence when the father returns to Hiroshima, the film shows "an interaction" of the past, present, and future, which is indicative of "the slipperiness of memory", a technique that "makes more visible and effective the ongoing resonance of the past in the present" but that "rejects the politics of the bombing" of the first part of the film. Kumiko Asō won several acting awards in Japan for her role as Minami Hirano.

=== Awards ===
The manga has won two awards, the 2004 Japan Media Arts Festival's Grand Prize for manga and the 2005 Tezuka Osamu Cultural Prize's Creative Award.

The film won several awards, including the 17th Japanese Film Critics Award for Best Picture, placing sixth in the top ten films list of the 3rd Osaka Cinema Festival, and placing ninth in the top ten domestic films list of 2007 by Kinema Junpo. The Blue Ribbon Awards also named the film one of the top ten films of the year. Kumiko Asō won several "Best Actress" awards for her portrayal of Minami Hirano in the film, including that of the 32nd Hochi Film Awards, the 62nd Mainichi Film Awards, and the 50th Blue Ribbon Awards.
