= Specialist (TV series) =

- Promotional poster
- Genre: Drama
- Written by: Masashi Todayama; Yūichi Tokunaga
- Directed by: Gō Shichitaka; Takurō Oikawa; Mitsunobu Hosokawa
- Starring: Tsuyoshi Kusanagi; Kaho Minami; Yūta Hiraoka
- Country of origin: Japan
- Original language: Japanese
- No. of series: 1
- No. of episodes: 10

Production
- Producers: Kōichi Funatsu; Seiji Kawashima; Masayuki Meguro; Kenichi Wasano
- Running time: 54 minutes
- Production companies: TV Asahi; Toei Company

Original release
- Network: TV Asahi
- Release: January 14 – March 17, 2016

Specialist (スペシャリスト) is a Japanese television drama series that premiered on TV Asahi on 14 January 2016. It was previously aired as Saturday Night drama from 2013 to 2015. In this drama, Tsuyoshi Kusanagi, a member of SMAP, played the lead role, Kaho Minami, Yūta Hiraoka and Natsuna appeared in supporting roles. The first episode received a viewership rating of 17.1%, and its overall average was 12.0%. It was Sei Ashina’s final television role before her death in 2020.

== Plot ==
In this drama series, Yoshito Takuma (Tsuyoshi Kusanagi) works together with his former team, consisting of Chinami Anekoji (Kaho Minami), Yuiko Matsubara (Sei Asahina), Kohei Horikawa (Yuta Hiraoka) and newcomer Maria Azuma (Natsuna Watanabe), to solve a variety of cases.

== Cast ==
- Tsuyoshi Kusanagi as Yoshito Takuma
- Kaho Minami as Chinami Anekōji
- Yūta Hiraoka as Kōhei Horikawa
- Natsuna as Maria Azuma
- Sei Ashina as Yuiko Matsubara
- Masato Wada as Nozomu Nogata
- Mitsuru Fukikoshi as Hiroki Takidō

== Episodes ==
No.	Title	Directed by	Original release date	Viewers (%)
1	"10年間刑務所にいた刑事! トリックだらけの密室殺人!! 美人妻の空白の300日"	Gō Shichitaka	14 January 2016	17.1
2	"10年服役した刑事! いろはカルタ殺人事件月夜に狙われた女!!"	Gō Shichitaka	21 January 2016	12.5
3	"時効寸前! 殺人罪を消滅させるトリック!? 悪女の復讐!!"	Gō Shichitaka	28 January 2016	14.1
4	"女刑事・姉小路の罪 5年の嘘!? 京都～東京2つの殺人の点と線"	Takurō Oikawa	4 February 2016	11.8
5	"殺人上映会! 死んだ女優から謎の招待状…容疑者は観客全員!?"	Takurō Oikawa	11 February 2016	12.1
6	"復讐のピアニスト! 母子を引き裂く遠隔殺人トリック!!"	Mitsunobu Hosokawa	18 February 2016	12.2
7	"病院が巨大密室に!? 致死率100%ウイルス ナースの完全犯罪!!"	Mitsunobu Hosokawa	25 February 2016	11.5
8	"最終章! 殺人トーナメントの標的は宅間!? 妻との永遠の別れ…"	Takurō Oikawa	3 March 2016	10.9
9	"すべての謎が明らかに! 冤罪に陥れた男とついに対決!!"	Gō Shichitaka	10 March 2016	11.3
10	"さよなら宅間! 目撃者は1000人!! 命がけの逆転トリック"	Gō Shichitaka	17 March 2016	12.0

Preceded by Isan Sōzoku (October 22, 2015 - December 17, 2015)	TV Asahi Thursday Dramas; Thursdays 21:00 - 21:54 (JST)	Succeeded by Good Partner: Muteki no Bengoshi (April 21, 2016 - June 2016)
