= Swing Girls =

2004 Japanese coming-of-age teen musical comedy film by Shinobu Yaguchi

- Theatrical release poster
- Japanese: スウィングガールズ
- Directed by: Shinobu Yaguchi
- Screenplay by: Shinobu Yaguchi
- Based on: Tateshina High School Jazz Club and Takasago High School Big Friendly Jazz Orchestra
- Produced by: Shintaro Horikawa; Daisuke Sekiguchi
- Starring: Juri Ueno; Yuta Hiraoka; Shihori Kanjiya; Yuika Motokariya
- Cinematography: Takahide Shibanushi
- Edited by: Ryūji Miyajima
- Music by: Hiroshi Kishimoto; Mickie Yoshino
- Production companies: Altamira Pictures; DENTSU Music and Entertainment; Fuji Television Network
- Distributed by: Toho
- Release date: September 11, 2004 (Japan)
- Running time: 105 minutes
- Country: Japan
- Box office: $18.45 million

Swing Girls (Japanese: スウィングガールズ, Hepburn: Suwingu Gāruzu) is a 2004 Japanese coming-of-age teen musical comedy film co-written and directed by Shinobu Yaguchi. The plot follows a group of inept high school girls who form a big band. The cast includes Juri Ueno, Yuta Hiraoka, Shihori Kanjiya, Yuika Motokariya and Yukari Toyashima.The film ranked 8th at the Japanese box office in 2004, and won seven prizes at 28th Japan Academy Prize, including "Most Popular Film" and "Newcomer of the Year" for Yuta Hiraoka and Juri Ueno.

== Plot ==
A class of schoolgirls are bored during their summer make up class. When the school brass band leaves to perform at a baseball game without their bento lunches, Tomoko and the other girls persuade their math teacher, Mr. Ozawa, to let them deliver the lunches. On the train, the girls fall asleep after eating one of the lunches and miss their stop. They walk back to deliver the bentos to the band, but they have spoiled in the summer heat, and all but their cymbal player, Takuo Nakamura, who missed out on his meal, fell ill.

Takuo holds an audition for band replacements to play at an upcoming baseball game. Only three girls audition: two former members of a punk band, and the shy Kaori Sekiguchi. Takuo confronts the other girls, threatening to turn them in for the food poisoning in if they do not join. The girls have no musical experience and clown around with their instruments, except for Kaori. As they are several members short of a brass band, Takuo decides to turn the group into a big band and perform swing jazz.

The girls train hard for the performance. Kaori's talent inspires the others, and they come to enjoy playing. However, on the day before the game, just as the girls have become confident, the brass band members recover and the girls are devastated.

As the second school semester begins, Tomoko sells her family's PlayStation 2 along with her computer and its peripherals, and buys a used tenor saxophone, which she soon damages, breaking the low B-flat pad. While practicing, she discovers Takuo playing his keyboard and they share a short duet of Take the "A" Train. The members of the swing band gather at school and decide to buy their own instruments. The girls get supermarket jobs to earn money, but Tomoko and several others lose their wages when a cooking demonstration gets out of hand, triggering the store's fire sprinkler system. The remaining girls spend a day picking matsutake mushrooms, but are attacked by a boar; one of the girls accidentally stomps and crushes its skull. However, they claim reward money, as it had been destroying crops. With the money, the girls buy cheap, but damaged, instruments, and the two rockers convince their overly affectionate ex-boyfriends, who operate a wrecking yard, to repair them.

The group, now dubbed Swing Girls, play their first public show; the performance goes badly, but Kaori is given advice by an anonymous jazz fan. When the group approach him, he runs away. They chase him to his home and discover that he is Ozawa, who possesses an extensive collection of jazz records. Assuming he is an expert saxophonist, they convince him to lead the band.

The band's skills improve and they record an audition tape for a music festival. They leave Tomoko in charge of the tape, but she sends it too late and the band is rejected. Tomoko is too embarrassed to tell the others. Nakamura discovers that Ozawa is not really a professional saxophonist and is in fact an amateur student himself. Embarrassed, Ozawa pleads with Nakamura to keep it a secret before quitting the festival performance to the girls' shame.

On the train to the music festival, Tomoko confesses that the band have no place at the festival, and the train is halted by snow due to debris on the tracks. Initially disappointed by the news, the band decides to play in the train anyway. At that moment, their teacher Itami arrives in a bus and informs them that another band has cancelled due to the snow and rushes them to the festival. The Swing Girls rush onstage just in time and perform their set, impressing the audience including their classmates, Itami, and Ozawa.

== Cast ==
Swing Girls is typical 17-piece big band

=== The Swing Girls and a Boy Orchestra ===
It consists of 16 female students and 1 male student in the first year of Yamakawa High School, a total of 17 students. The band's official name is Swing Girls and a Boy and is also known as Swing Girls for short.

- Juri Ueno as Tomoko Suzuki (Tenor saxophone)
- Yuta Hiraoka as Takuo Nakamura (Piano)
- Shihori Kanjiya as Yoshie Saito (Trumpet)
- Yuika Motokariya as Kaori Sekiguchi (Trombone)
- Yukari Toyoshima as Naomi Tanaka (Drums)
- Kana Sekine as Hiromi Watanabe (Electric guitar)
- Fumiko Mizuta as Yuka Yamamoto (Electric bass)
- Masae Nemoto as Akemi Otsu (Tenor saxophone)
- Asuka (Asuka Yamaguchi) as Chika Kubo (Alto saxophone)
- Chise Nakamura as Emiko Okamura (Alto saxophone)
- Madoka Matsuda as Yumiko Shimizu (Baritone saxophone)
- Mutsumi Kanazaki as Rie Ishikawa (Trumpet)
- Nagisa Abe as Reiko Shimoda (Trumpet)
- Misa Nagashima as Misato Miyazaki (Trumpet)
- Eri Maehara as Kayo Yoshida (Trombone)
- Natsuki Nakaza as Miho Kinoshita (Trombone)
- Natsuko Tatsumi as Yoko Kobayashi (Trombone)

=== Tomoko Suzuki's Family ===
- Yasumi Suzuki, Father of Tomoko: Fumiyo Kohinata
- Sanae Suzuki, Mother of Tomoko: Eriko Watanabe
- Aki Suzuki, Tomoko's sister: Rina Kanako
- Tomoko's grandmother, Mie Suzuki: Mutsuko Sakura

=== Yamakawa High School ===
- Tadahiko Ozawa, Math Teacher: Naoto Takenaka
- Music Teacher Yayoi Itami: Miho Shiraishi
- Dr. Kubota: Makoto Takarai
- General Manager of Brass Band Club: Issei Takahashi
- Baseball Club Member Inoue: Seiji Fukushi
- Chie Iwasa: Mayuko Iwasa

=== Other ===
- Bus driver: Jiro Sato
- Bento shop: Noyuki Mori shimo
- Cherry Television Announcer: Yuko Takeda ( Fuji TV Announcer )
- Mr. Sasaki, a classmate of the telephone network: Nakazawa Tsuki (voice appearance)
- Old Woman: Yasuko Mori
- Musical instrument shop clerk: Norika Eguchi
- Supermarket Manager Takahashi: Hana Kino
- Super Floor Chief Okamura: Koji Okura
- Supermarket customers demanding discount stickers: Sayuri Ito
- Takashi, brother of brother duo: Hidekazu Mashima
- Yusuke Mikami, brother of brother duo: Makoto Mikami
- Wife in front of the park: Mari Hayashida
- Karaoke Box Clerk Ito: Yu Tokui
- Pachinko parlor manager: Tanaka Keiko
- Pachinko parlor guest: Satoshi Sakata
- Pachinko parlor guest: Reo Yamaguchi
- Yamaha Music Class Teacher Mori shimo (trombone): Kei Tani
- Yamaha Music Class Student Masumi (Wood Bass): Naomi Nishida
- Satoshi Tanimoto, Student of Yamaha Music Class ( Electronic Piano ): Kazuhiro Tanimoto
- Train Conductor: Yuji Kogata
- Train passengers: Hiroshi Kishimoto
- Music Hall Moderator: Daikichi Sugawara (Note: In the DVD-version with English subtitles the credits adds the names of actors randomly i.e. the sequence of persons shown does not match the name below.)

=== Staff ===
- Writer/Director: Shinobu Yaguchi
- Producers: Chihiro Kameyama, Nonari Shimatani, Ryuichi Mori
- Executive Producer: Shoji Masui
- Projects: Kazuyuki Seki, Masamichi Fujiwara, Takehiko Chino
- Producers: Daisuke Sekiguchi, Shintaro Horikawa
- Advertising Producer: Erika Harada
- Script cooperation: Junko Yaguchi (Wife of Director Yaguchi)
- Music: Mickey Yoshino, Hiroshi Kishimoto
- Recording Engineer: Masumi Hamamoto
- Band Direction: Reo Yamaguchi
- Photo: Takahide Shibaso
- Lighting: Tatsuya Nagata
- Sound: Kodo Gun
- Art: Norihiro Isoda
- Editing: Miyajima Ryuji
- Supporting Director: Shozo Katashima
- Line Producer: Tatsuya Mmoshi
- Producer: Yuko Maemura
- Assistant Director: Yuichi Naruse, Man Sugita, Kako Araki
- Animal Trainer: Kazuo Numata
- Language instruction: Hidekazu Mashima, Sayuri Ito (mainly in Mashima's absence)
- Production: Fuji TV, Altamila Pictures, Toho, Dentsu

== Music ==
- "Take the A Train" by Billy Strayhorn (rehearsal song).
- "In the Mood" by Joe Garland (song for the first performance and later for audition tape).
- "Comin Thro' the Rye" (the first song played at the second performance).
- "Make Her Mine" by Eric Leese (the second song).
- "Moonlight Serenade" by Mitchel Parish / Glenn Miller (the first song played at the concert finale).
- "Mexican Flyer" by Ken Woodman (the second song). It is featured in Space Channel 5, which Tomoko's little sister plays early on in the movie.
- "Sing, Sing, Sing (With a Swing)" by Loise Prima performed by Benny Goodman (the third song).
- "What a Wonderful World" by Robert Thiele (aka "George Douglas") and George David Weiss (shown as movie credits). Performed by Louis Armstrong (The song in mushroom picking forest).
- "Recollection" by Kohsuke Mine.
- "L-O-V-E" by Bert Kaempfert / Milt Gabler performed by Nat King Cole (the general film tune at the end).

== Release ==
Swing Girls was released in Japan on September 11, 2004 where it was distributed by Toho.

== Awards ==
- 28th Japan Academy Awards (The largest number of award-winning films in the same year)
  - Outstanding Work Award
  - Best Director: Fumi yasushi Yaguchi
  - Best Screenplay: Fumi yasushi Yaguchi
  - Best Music: Mickey Yoshino / Hiroshi Kishimoto
  - Best Recording: Hiromido Gun
  - Best Editor: Ryuji Miyajima
  - Best New Actor (rookie): Juri Ueno, Yuta Hiraoka
  - Topic Award: Work Category
- The 26th Yokohama Film Festival
  - The 10 Best Japanese Movies: 4th
  - Japan Film Individual Award
  - Best Screenplay: Fumi yasushi Yaguchi
  - Photography Award: Takahide Shibaso ("Swing Girls", "Need to Take a Deep Breath", "Yingyance")
  - Best Newcomer: Juri Ueno (Swing Girls, Jose, The Tiger and the Fish, Chillsok Summer)
- The 14th Japan Film Critics Awards: Award for Best Film
- The 78th Kinema Shunpo Best Japanese Movie Ten: No.7
- The 47th Blue Ribbon Award: Best Japanese Film
- The 46th Japan Record Awards Planning Award: SWING GIRLS & Mickey Yoshino et al. ("SWING GIRLS" ORIGINAL SOUNDTRACK/ Universal Music Co., Ltd.)
- The 19th Japan Gold Disc Awards Soundtrack Album of the Year: SWING GIRLS/Mickey Yoshino (Swing Girls Original Soundtrack/Universal Music)
- The 2nd Japan Film and Television Recording Association Recording Award: Encouragement Award
- 29th E'Randall Awards Producer Encouragement Award: Shoji Masui
- The 59th Mainichi Film Competition Sponici Grand Prix Rookie of the Year: Juri Ueno ("Chillsok No Natsu", "Swing Girls")
- The 14th Tokyo Sports Film Awards NewComer Award (Nominated): Juri Ueno
