= Juri Ueno =

Japanese actress (born 1986)

- 上野 樹里
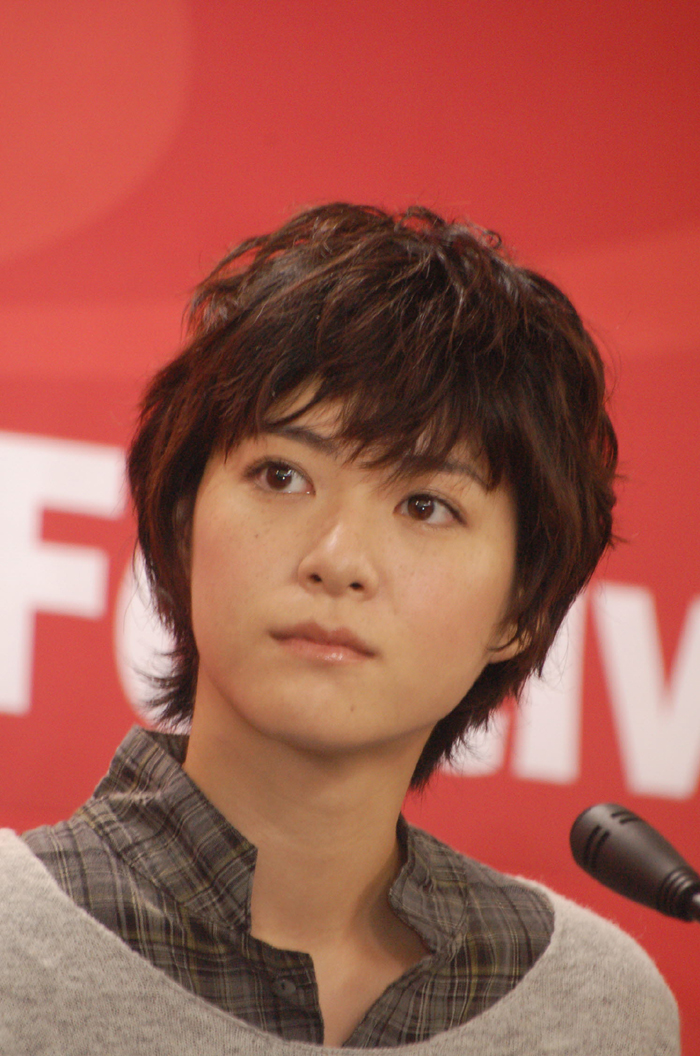
- Ueno at the 2008 Busan International Film Festival
- Born: 25 May 1986 (age 40); Kakogawa, Hyōgo, Japan
- Occupation: Actress
- Years active: 2000–present
- Agent: Amuse Inc.
- Height: 1.67 m (5 ft 5 1/2 in)
- Spouse: Sho Wada (m. 2016)

Juri Ueno (上野 樹里, Ueno Juri; born 25 May 1986) is a Japanese actress. She first gained recognition in the 2004 film Swing Girls where she was a recipient of Newcomer of the Year prize at the Japanese Academy Awards. Ueno achieved mainstream success for playing the title role in the live-action adaptations of manga Nodame Cantabile for which she won Best Lead Actress at the 51st Television Drama Academy Awards in 2007. She further gained acclaim with her role in the television series Last Friends for which she won Best Supporting Actress at the Nikkan Sports Drama Grand Prix and the 57th Television Drama Academy Awards in 2008.

== Career ==
Ueno made her television debut in 2002 at the age of 16 in the NHK series Seizon before making her first film major appearance in 2003 in Chirosoku no Natsu which won her the Sponichi Grand Prize New Talent Award at the Mainichi Film Awards along with her performance in the 2004 film, Swing Girls. Swing Girls proved to be a breakthrough when she received critical acclaim and awards for Best Newcomer at the Yokohama Film Festival (she was also honored for her performance in Joze to Tora to Sakana Tachi) and the Japanese Academy Awards.

In 2004, Ueno took on a supporting role in TBS's romance drama, Orange Days, and co-starred in 2005 with Takuya Kimura in Fuji TV's romantic comedy Engine as Misae Hoshino. She also appeared with Kazuya Kamenashi in the special television movie of Kinda'ichi Shōnen no Jikenbo the same year taking over the role of Miyuki Nanase from Anne Suzuki.

Ueno's popularity rose further when she was cast as Megumi Noda ("Nodame") in the 2006 live-action television adaptation of the popular manga Nodame Cantabile. Co-starring opposite Hiroshi Tamaki, the series' 11-episode run was a success with an average viewership rating of 18.79% with the season finalé garnering 21.7% of the viewership share for its time slot. Ueno's portrayal as the eccentric and disorganized but yet extremely affable and talented pianist won her "Best Lead Actress" at the 51st Television Drama Academy Awards while the show won "Best Drama". The show was also recognized overseas at the 2nd Seoul Drama Festival where it was awarded "Best Miniseries". Ueno and Tamaki reprised their roles in 2007 in the two-part special, Nodame Cantabile Shinshun Special in Europe, which chronicles their individual struggles to achieve success on Europe's storied classical music stage whilst being away from each other.

In 2008, Ueno reunited with Nodame co-stars Eita and Asami Mizukawa in Fuji TV's drama, Last Friends, as Ruka Kishimoto, a talented motocross racer with a hidden secret she cannot discuss with friends or family. Taeko Asano, the screenwriter of Last Friends praised Ueno's acting of Ruka, stating that Ueno is a "natural genius" and that she became "the character itself". Ueno won "Best Supporting Actress" at the 12th Nikkan Sports Drama Grand Prix and The 57th Television Drama Academy Awards for her role. She was recognised as "Best Student Voice Actress" at the 2008 MTV Student Voice Awards for her role in Wanko.

The Japanese version of Vogue named her as one of the "Women of the Year 2008".

On 9 December 2008, it was announced that she would reprise her role as "Nodame" in a new Nodame Cantabile two-movie sequel slated for release in 2010, with filming to start in May 2009.

On 25 January 2010, it was announced that Ueno would be the lead in the 2011 NHK Taiga drama Gō based on an original script by Atsuhime writer Kumiko Tabuchi (田渕 久美子, Tabuchi Kumiko). with filming starting in August 2010. The series is Ueno's first role in a historical drama. Gō is NHK's 50th Taiga drama, and only its 10th drama with a woman as the main character. On April 15, 2010, Ueno took the role of "Haru" in the spring J-Drama Sunao ni Narenakute which tells a story of the blossoming friendship between five people through Twitter, along with Eita], Hero Jaejoong, Megumi Seki and Tetsuji Tamayama.

On 11 September 2010, Ueno guest starred in the Korean variety show MBC's We Got Married Season 2 while promoting Nodame Cantabile - The Movie and paid a visit to SNSD's Seohyun and CN Blue's Jung Yong-hwa. In 2013 she returned to acting with a leading role in the romance film Girl in the Sunny Place opposite actor Jun Matsumoto which was based on the best selling novel of the same name. The film opened in Japanese theaters on October 12 and was a commercial success topping the box office and grossing ¥763 million after eight days.

In 2014 she starred in the TBS revenge drama Alice no Toge as Mizuno Asumi a young woman who becomes a doctor at the hospital her father was treated at in order to get revenge on those responsible for his death. This was followed by another leading role in the TBS television drama Ouroboros based on the manga of the same name and opposite actors Toma Ikuta and Shun Oguri. This marks her first time starring in a detective drama. and she joined alongside Korean singer T.O.P for romantic Web drama titled Secret Message.

In 2021, Ueno starred in 'Is Love Sustainable?'

== Personal life ==
Ueno married Triceratops band member Sho Wada on May 26, 2016.

== Filmography ==
=== Film ===
Year	Title	Role	Notes	Ref.
2003	Josee, the Tiger and the Fish	Kanae		
2004	Swing Girls	Tomoko Suzuki (Tenor Sax)	Lead role	
2004	The Stars Converge	Mari Sugiyama		
2005	Summer Time Machine Blues	Haruka Shibata		
2005	Turtles Are Surprisingly Fast Swimmers	Suzume Katakura	Lead role	
2006	Arch Angels	Fumio Shijo	Lead role	
2006	Christmas on July 24th Avenue	Megumi Kamibayashi		
2006	Rainbow Song	Aoi Sato	Lead role	
2006	Shiawase no Switch	Rei Inada	Lead role	
2006	Sea Without Exit	Minako Narumi		
2008	Child by Children			
2008	Goo Goo, The Cat	Naomi		
2008	Kung-Fu Kun			
2008	Wanko the Movie 2	Narrator		
2008	Naoko	Naoko Shinomiya	Lead role	
2009	Killer Virgin Road	Hiroko	Lead role	
2009	Nodame Cantabile The Movie I	Noda Megumi aka "Nodame"	Lead role	
2010	Nodame Cantabile The Movie II	Noda Megumi aka "Nodame"	Lead role	
2013	Girl in the Sunny Place	Mao Watarai		
2015	The Beauty Inside	Woo-jin	South Korean film	
2016	Yell for the Blue Sky	Yōko Sugimura		
2016	My Dad and Mr. Ito	Aya	Lead role	
2023	Refugee X	Ryoko Kashiwagi	Lead role	

=== Television ===
Year	Title	Role	Network	Notes	Ref.
2001	Sayonara, Ozu sensei		Fuji TV		
2002	Seizon		NHK		
2003	The In-Laws	Kaori Matsui			
2003	Teru Teru Kazoku	Akiko Iwata	NHK	Asadora	
2004	Orange Days	Ayumi Kirishima	TBS		
2005	Engine	Misae Hoshino			
2005	Kyuketsuki Densetsu Satsujin Jiken	Miyuki Nanase		TV movie	
2006	Bokutachi no Sensou	Minami Kamoshita		TV movie	
2006	Tsubasa No Oreta Tenshitachi	Ryoko Shimojo		Lead role	
2006	Nodame Cantabile	Megumi Noda	Fuji TV	Lead role	
2007	Jodan Ja Nai!	Eren Takamura	TBS		
2007	Marumaru Chibi Maruko-chan SP	Maruko-chan	Fuji TV		
2008	Nodame Cantabile New Year Special in Europe	Megumi Noda	Fuji TV	Lead role	
2008	Loss Time Life		Fuji TV	Lead role	
2008	Last Friends	Ruka Kishimoto	Fuji TV		
2009	Ueno Juri to Itsutsu no Kaban	Herself	Wowow	Lead role	
2010	Sunao ni Narenakute	Tukiko Mizuno	Fuji TV	Lead role	
2011	Gō	Gō	NHK	Lead role, Taiga drama	
2014	Europe Kikaku 26th Century Fox	Fumiko Sawano	Fuji TV		
2014	The Thorns of Alice	Asumi Mizuno	TBS	Lead role	
2014	Hard to say I love you	Haru	Fuji TV		
2015	Ouroboros	Inspector Mizuki Hibino	TBS		
2015	The Secret Message	Haruka	Naver TV Cast-LINE	Lead role	
2016	The State of Union	Hanako Kumagai	TBS		
2018	Good Doctor	Natsumi Seto	Fuji TV		
2019	Medical Examiner Asagao	Asagao Maki	Fuji TV	Lead role	
2020	Ship of Theseus	Yuki Tamura	TBS	Special appearance	
2022	Is Love Sustainable?	Kyoka Sawada	TBS	Lead role	
2022	He's Expecting	Aki Seto	Netflix	Lead role	

=== Photo books ===
- A Piacere (2006)

== Selected awards ==
=== 2005 ===
- 28th Japanese Academy Awards – Newcomer of the Year for Swing Girls
- 59th Mainichi Film Awards: Sponichi Grand Prize New Talent Award – Best Newcomer for Swing Girls and Chirusoku no Natsu
- 25th Yokohama Film Festival – Best New Talent for Swing Girls, Joze to tora to sakana tachi and Chirusoku no Natsu

=== 2007 ===
- 51st Television Drama Academy Awards – Best Lead Actress for Nodame Cantabile
- Elan d'or Awards – Best Newcomer for Nodame Cantabile

=== 2008 ===
- 12th Nikkan Sports Drama Grand Prix Award (Spring 2008) – Best Supporting Actress for Last Friends
- The Galaxy Award – monthly award (June), for the performance in Last Friends
- 57th Television Drama Academy Awards – Best Supporting Actress for Last Friends
- MTV Student Voice Award – Best Student Voice Actress
- 21st Japan Best Dressed Eyes Awards – Special Award
- International Drama Festival in Tokyo Awards 2008 – Best Actress for Nodame Cantabile in Europe
- Vogue – Women of the Year 2008

=== 2009 ===
- TV Life 18th Annual Drama Awards 2008 – Best Supporting Actress for Last Friends
- TV Navi Drama of The Year 2008 – Best Supporting Actress for Last Friends
- 17th Hashida Awards – Best Newcomer
