= Half a Confession =

- DVD cover for Half a Confession (2004)
- Directed by: Kiyoshi Sasabe
- Written by: Kiyoshi Sasabe; Toshiyuki Tabe
- Produced by: Sunao Sakagami
- Starring: Akira Terao; Mieko Harada; Kyohei Shibata
- Cinematography: Mutsuo Naganuma
- Edited by: Hideaki Ohata
- Music by: Tamiya Terajima
- Distributed by: Toei
- Release date: January 10, 2004 (Japan)
- Running time: 122 minutes
- Country: Japan
- Language: Japanese

Half a Confession (Japanese: 半落ち, Hepburn: Han'ochi) is a 2004 Japanese drama film directed by Kiyoshi Sasabe. It was chosen as Best Film at the Japan Academy Prize ceremony.

== Summary ==
Respected inspector Soichiro Kaji is imprisoned for killing his wife, Keiko, who, suffering from Alzheimer's disease, requested it. His colleagues at Tokyo Police Force discover that Kaji intended to commit suicide after killing her, but instead went away on a bullet train two days later. A suspicious item is found in his coat pocket that suggests Kaji was unfaithful. The incident makes headlines in Tokyo, where a young female reporter sets out to find the truth about the acclaimed yet intriguingly silent defendant. Soichiro Kaji has drawn the interest of many: lawyer, judge, detective, relative... Slowly they weave the tale behind it all and tentatively tread upon the question of euthanasia.

== Cast ==
- Akira Terao: Soichiro Kaji
- Mieko Harada: Keiko Kaji
- Hidetaka Yoshioka
- Mayu Tsuruta
- Kyohei Shibata
- Kirin Kiki: Yasuko Shimamura
- Reiko Takashima
- Jun Kunimura
- Tsuyoshi Ihara
- Tomoko Naraoka

== Reception ==
The film was nominated for twelve awards at the 2005 Japan Academy Prize, winning Best Film and Best Actor. It also won the award for Best Actor at the 2005 Blue Ribbon Awards.
