= Kiyoshi Sasabe =

Japanese film director (1958–2020)

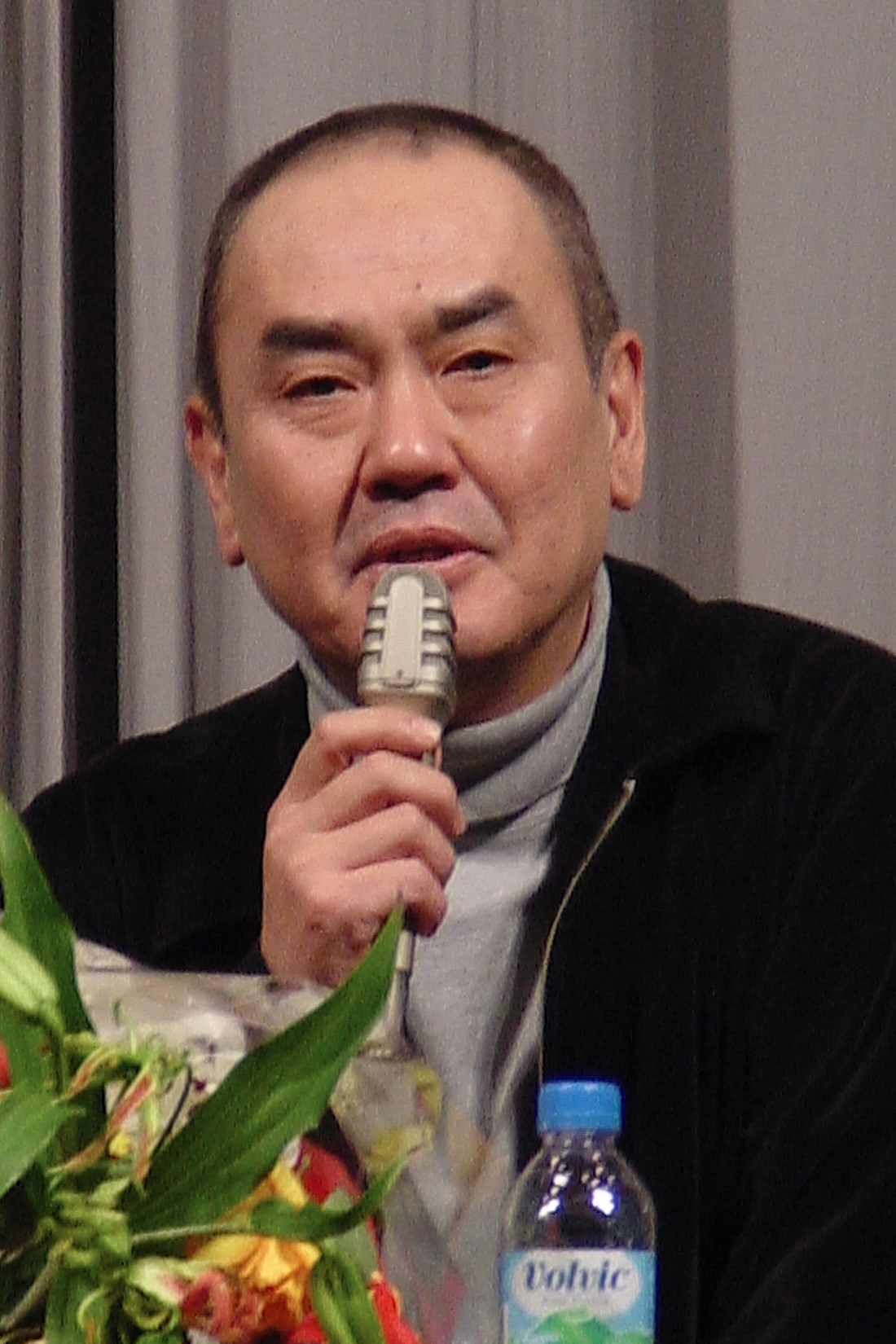
- Kiyoshi Sasabe in 2008
- Born: January 8, 1958; Shimonoseki, Yamaguchi, Japan
- Died: March 31, 2020 (aged 62)
- Occupation: Film director

Kiyoshi Sasabe (佐々部清) (January 8, 1958 – March 31, 2020) was a Japanese film director.

== Career ==
Born in Shimonoseki, Sasabe graduated from Meiji University before attending the Yokohama Hōsō Eiga Senmon Gakuin (now the Japan Academy of Moving Images). He worked as an assistant director to Yōichi Sai, Seiji Izumi, and Yasuo Furuhata before debuting as a director in 2002 with Hi wa mata noboru. He received the Directors Guild of Japan New Directors Award for Chirusoku no natsu in 2003. His Half a Confession won the best picture award at the 28th Japan Academy Prize. He also directed TV movies.

== Selected filmography ==
- Hi wa mata noboru (2002)
- Chirusoku no natsu (2003)
- Half a Confession (2004)
- Deguchi no nai umi (2006)
- Town of Evening Calm, Country of Cherry Blossoms (2007)
- Tsure ga Utsu ni Narimashite (2011)
- Tokyo Refugees (2014)
- Kono Michi (TBA)
