= Imamichi =

Imamichi (written: 今道) is a Japanese surname. Notable people with the surname include:

- Tomonobu Imamichi (今道 友信; 1922–2012), Japanese philosopher
- Tomotaka Imamichi (今道 友隆; born 1959), Japanese musician
