= Rokkaku-dō (disambiguation) =

Rokkaku-dō may refer to:

- Rokkaku-dō, Buddhist temple in Kyoto
- Rokkaku-dō (architecture)
- Rokkakudō (Kitaibaraki)
