= Okakura Kakuzō =

Japanese scholar and art critic (1863–1913)

Okakura Tenshin
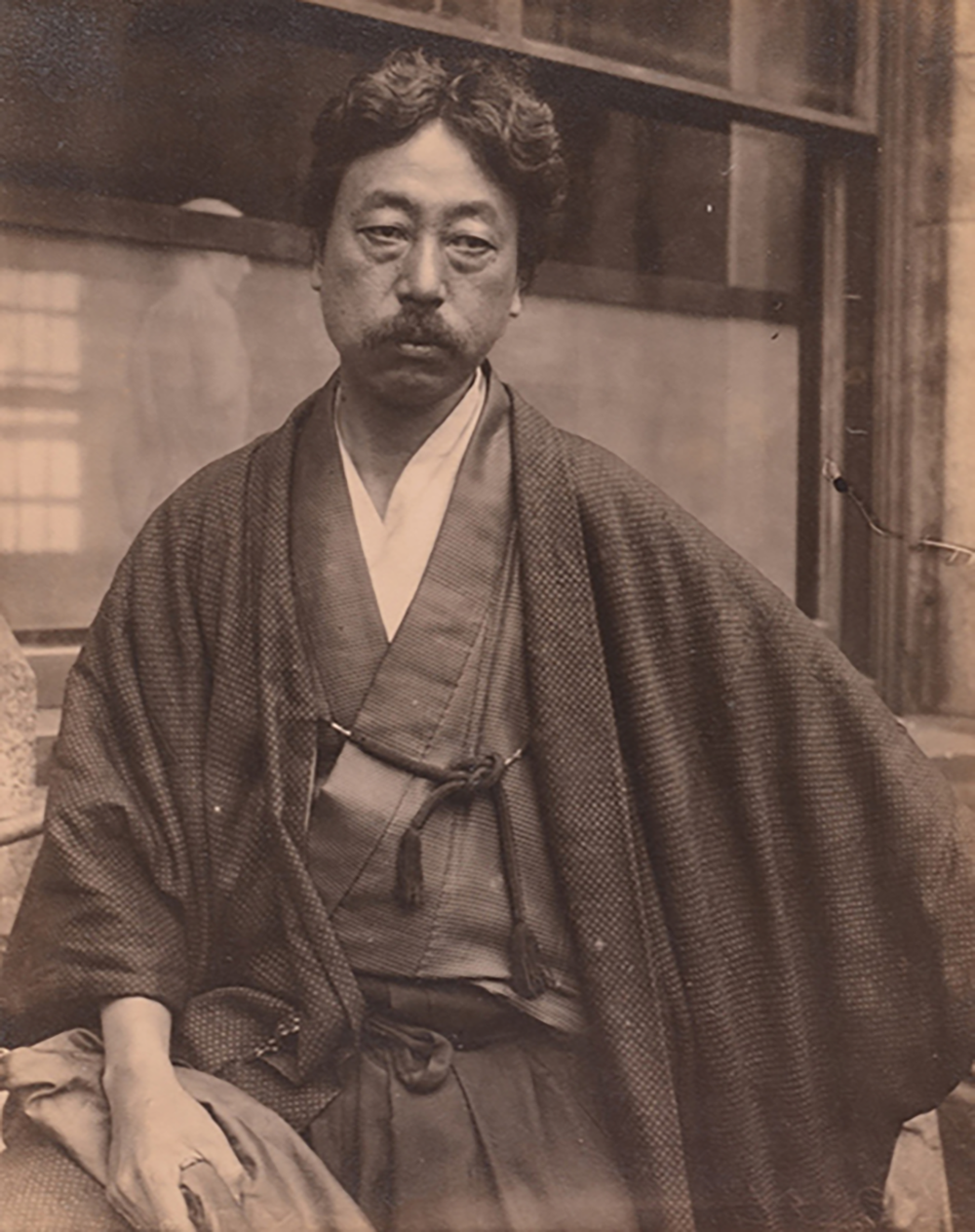
- Okakura Kakuzō c. 1905
- Born: February 14, 1863; Yokohama
- Died: September 2, 1913 (aged 50); Myōkō, Niigata
- Other name: Okakura Kakuzō
- Occupations: Artist, writer

Academic background
- Education: Tokyo Imperial University
- Influences: Zhuang Zhou

Academic work
- Era: Meiji Period
- Discipline: Art criticism
- Main interests: Japanese art, Japanese tea ceremony
- Notable works: The Book of Tea (1906)
- Notable ideas: Teaism
- Influenced: Ernest Fenollosa; Isabella Stewart Gardner; Abanindranath Tagore; Rabindranath Tagore; Ezra Pound; Heidegger (according to Imamichi); Swami Vivekananda

Okakura Kakuzō (岡倉 覚三; February 14, 1863 – September 2, 1913), also known as Okakura Tenshin (岡倉 天心), was a Japanese scholar and art critic who in the era of Meiji Restoration reform promoted a critical appreciation of traditional forms, customs and beliefs. Outside Japan, he is chiefly renowned for The Book of Tea: A Japanese Harmony of Art, Culture, and the Simple Life (1906). Written in English, and in the wake of the Russo-Japanese War, it decried Western caricaturing of the Japanese, and of Asians more generally, and expressed the fear that Japan gained respect only to the extent that it adopted the barbarities of Western militarism.

== Early life and education ==
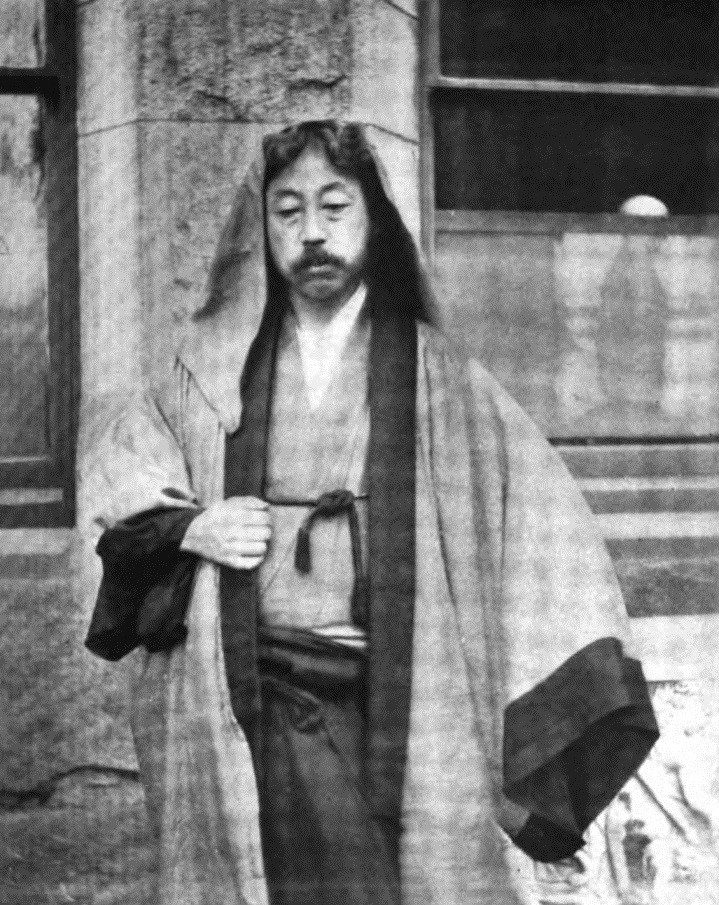
Okakura Kakuzō

The second son of Okakura Kan'emon, a former Fukui Domain treasurer turned silk merchant, and Kan'emon's second wife, Kakuzō was named for the corner warehouse (角蔵) in which he was born, but later changed the spelling of his name to different Kanji meaning "awakened boy" (覚三).

Okakura learned English while attending Yoshisaburō, a school operated by a Christian missionary, Dr. James Curtis Hepburn, of the Hepburn romanization system. Here, he became well-versed in the foreign language but couldn't read Kanji, the characters of his homeland. As a result, his father got him to concurrently study western culture at Yoshisaburō and traditional Japanese in a Buddhist temple. After the abolition of the feudal system in 1871, his family moved from Yokohama to Tokyo. In 1875, Okakura joined them and won a scholarship to the Tokyo Institute of Foreign Languages. Quickly after, the school was renamed to Tokyo Imperial University. It was at this prestigious academy that he first met and studied under the Harvard-educated art historian Ernest Fenollosa.

== Career ==
In 1886, Okakura became secretary to the minister of education and was put in charge of musical affairs. Later in the same year he was named to the Imperial Art Commission and sent abroad to study fine arts in the Western world. After his return from Europe and the United States, in 1887 he helped found, and a year later became director of, the Tokyo School of Fine Arts (東京美術学校 Tōkyō Bijutsu Gakkō).

The new arts school represented "the first serious reaction to the lifeless conservatism" of traditionalists and the "equally uninspired imitation of western art" fostered by early Meiji enthusiasts. Limiting himself to more sympathetic aspects of art in the West, at the school, and in a new periodical Kokka, Okakura sought to rehabilitate ancient and native arts, honoring their ideals and exploring their possibilities. When, in 1897, it became clear that European methods were to be given ever increasing prominence in the school curriculum, he resigned his directorship. Six months later he renewed the effort, as he saw it, to draw on western art without impairing national inspiration in the Nihon Bijutsuin (日本美術院, lit. "Japan Visual Arts Academy"), founded with Hashimoto Gahō and Yokoyama Taikan and thirty-seven other leading artists.

At the Tokyo School of Fine Arts, Okakura designated common painting themes and conducted collective critiques. At the Japan Art Institute, Okakura used monthly internal competitions to guide the professional painters. Moreover, Weston pointed out that the joint discussions of works between Okakura and the painters promoted the exchange of painting ideas and methods.

At the same time, Okakura had opposed the Shintoist Haibutsu Kishaku movement which, in the wake of the Meiji Restoration had sought to expel Buddhism from Japan. With Ernest Fenollosa, he worked to repair damaged Buddhist temples, images and texts.

Okakura was a cosmopolitan who retained an international sense of self. He wrote all of his main works in English. Okakura researched Japan's traditional art and traveled to Europe, the United States and China, and lived two years in India during which he engaged in dialogue with Swami Vivekananda and Rabindranath Tagore. Okakura emphasised the importance to the modern world of Asian culture, attempting to bring its influence to realms of art and literature that, in his day, were largely dominated by Western culture. In 1906, he was invited by William Sturgis Bigelow to the Museum of Fine Arts, Boston and became the Curator of its Department of Japanese and Chinese Art in 1910. From 1886, he was a close friend of American artist John La Farge, to whom he dedicated The Book of Tea. Okakura also advised La Farge in his creation of murals for the Supreme Court of Minnesota.

In 1905, Okakura hosted a tea ceremony by candlelight at Fenway Court in Boston and later presented one of his cherished tea sets to Isabella Stewart Gardner.

Gardner enthusiastically recalled the ceremony in a letter to Bernard Berenson in 1905.

== Works ==
His 1903 book on Asian artistic and cultural history, The Ideals of the East with Special Reference to the Art of Japan, published on the eve of the Russo-Japanese War, is famous for its opening paragraph in which he sees a spiritual unity throughout Asia, which distinguishes it from the West:

Asia is one. The Himalayas divide, only to accentuate, two mighty civilisations, the Chinese with its communism of Confucius, and the Indian with its individualism of the Vedas. But not even the snowy barriers can interrupt for one moment that broad expanse of love for the Ultimate and Universal, which is the common thought-inheritance of every Asiatic race, enabling them to produce all the great religions of the world, and distinguishing them from those maritime peoples of the Mediterranean and the Baltic, who love to dwell on the Particular, and to search out the means, not the end, of life.

In his subsequent book, The Awakening of Japan, published in 1904, he argued that "the glory of the West is the humiliation of Asia." This was an early expression of Pan-Asianism. In this book Okakura also noted that Japan's rapid modernization was not universally applauded in Asia: ″We have become so eager to identify ourselves with European civilization instead of Asiatic that our continental neighbors regard us as renegades—nay, even as an embodiment of the White Disaster itself."

In The Book of Tea, written and published in 1906, has been described as "the earliest lucid English-language account of Zen Buddhism and its relation to the arts". Okakura argued that "Tea is more than an idealization of the form of drinking; it is a religion of the art of life".

[Teaism] insulates purity and harmony, the mystery of mutual charity, the romanticism of the social order. It is essentially a worship of the Imperfect, as it is a tender attempt to accomplish something possible in this impossible thing we know as life.

None of this, he suggested, was appreciated by the Westerner. In his "sleek complacency", the Westerner views the tea ceremony as "but another instance of the thousand and one oddities which constitute the quaintness and childishness of the East to him". Writing in the aftermath of the Russo-Japanese War, Okakura commented that the Westerner regarded Japan as "barbarous while she indulged in the gentle arts of peace", and began to call her civilized only when "she began to commit wholesale slaughter on the Manchurian battlefields".

Okakura's final work, The White Fox, written under the patronage of Isabella Stewart Gardner in 1912, was an English-language libretto for the Boston Opera House. The libretto incorporates elements from both kabuki plays and Wagner's epic Tannhäuser and may be understood, metaphorically, as an expression of Okakura's hoped-for reconciliation of East and West. Charles Martin Loeffler agreed to Garner's request to put the poetic drama to music, but the project was never staged.

The Awakening of the East was published after Okakura's death, with his family recovering the manuscript in 1938 and arranging for its publication in Japanese translation; the original English manuscript was released in 1940.

The Book of Tea

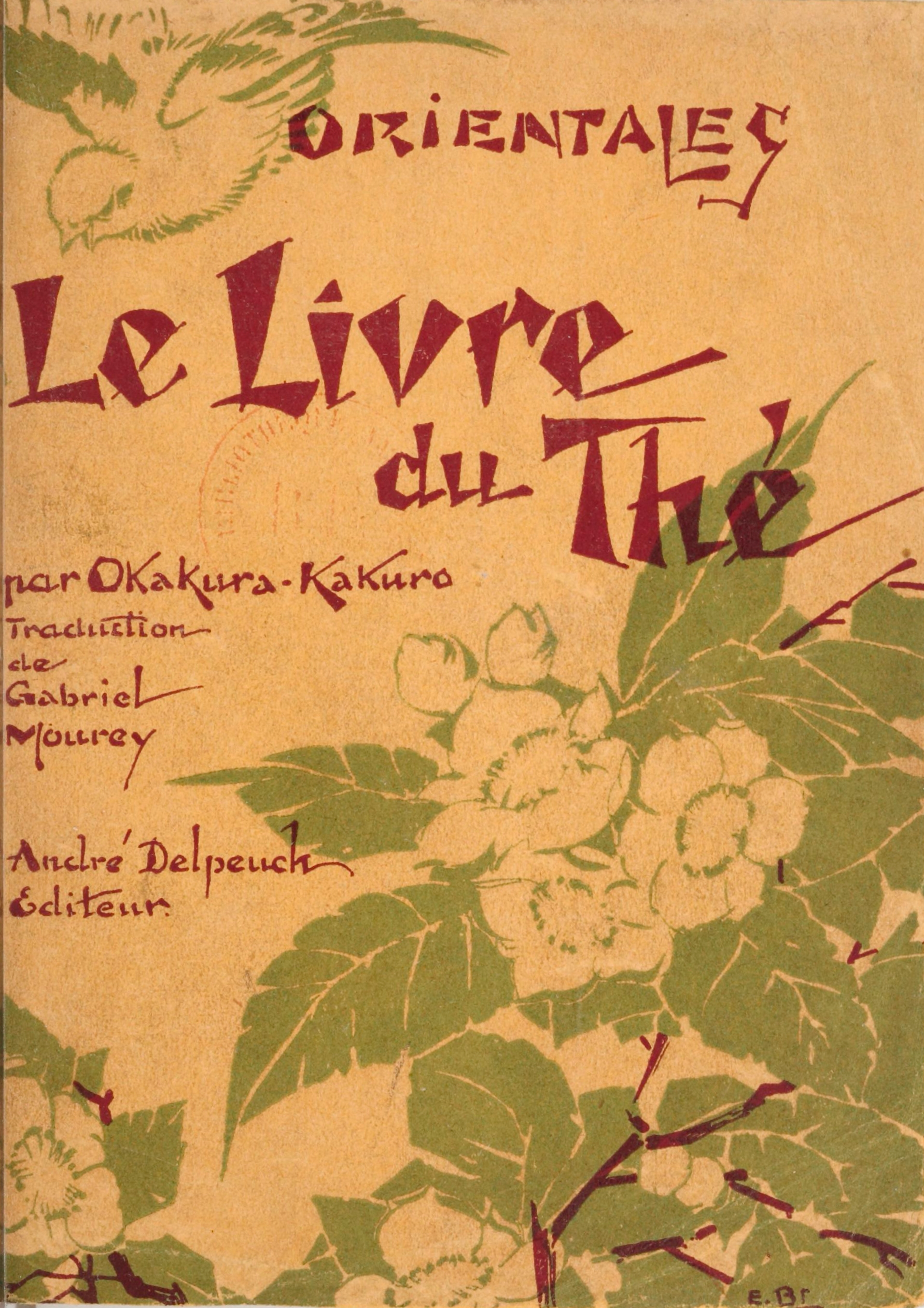
Le livre du thé, 1927

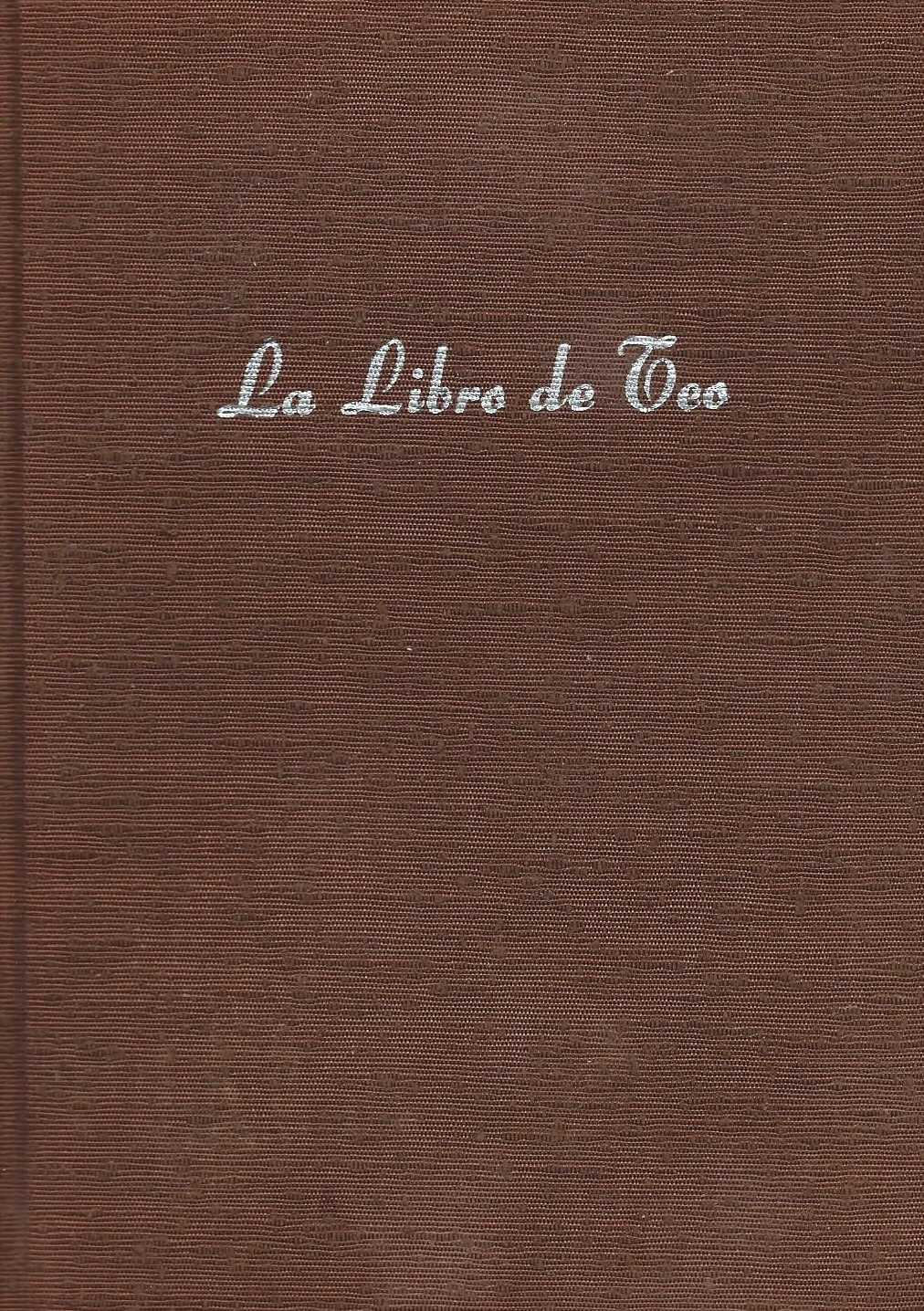
Translation of work in Esperanto

== Death ==
Okakura's health deteriorated in his later years. "My ailment the doctors say is the usual complaint of the twentieth century—Bright's disease," he wrote a friend in June 1913. "I have eaten things in various parts of the globe—too varied for the hereditary notions of my stomach and kidneys. However I am getting well again and I am thinking of going to China in September." In August, 1913, "Kakuzo insisted on going to his mountain villa in Akakura, and finally his wife, daughter and his sister took him there by train. For a week or so, Kakuzo felt a little better and was able to talk with people, but on August 25, he had a heart attack and spent several days in great pain. Surrounded by his family, relatives and his disciples, he passed away on September 2."

== Legacy ==
In Japan, Okakura, along with Hashimoto Gahō, a painter of the Kano School, has been credited with "saving" the Japanese Nihonga tradition of painting in the face of Western-style painting, or "Yōga", whose chief advocate was artist Kuroda Seiki. However, while accepting that with regard to Japan Okakura played a pioneering role in the practice of aesthetic hermeneutics, contemporary art scholars are no longer convinced of the "threat" posed by western painting. They are also critical of the manner in which Okakura, as "the founding father of the 'Myth of Asian Spiritualism'", shaped notions of an east–west dichotomy.

Outside Japan, Okakura influenced a number of important figures, directly or indirectly, who include Swami Vivekananda, philosopher Martin Heidegger, poet Ezra Pound, and especially poet Rabindranath Tagore and art benefactor, collector and museum founder Isabella Stewart Gardner, who were close personal friends of his. He was also one of a trio of Japanese artists who introduced the wash technique to Abanindranath Tagore, the father of modern Indian watercolor.

In Bharucha's account, Okakura demonstrated to Abanindranath Tagore and Nandalal Bose the relationship among tradition, nature, and originality using matchsticks. Bharucha explains that these three elements interact with each other. Bharucha's analysis highlights that Okakura valued the inner spirit of nature in artistic expression, as well as the memory and imagination of the artists.

As part of the Izura Institute of Arts & Culture, Ibaraki University manages Rokkakudō, an hexagonal wooden retreat overlooking the sea along the Izura coast in Kitaibaraki, Ibaraki Prefecture, that was designed by Okakura and built in 1905. It is registered as a national monument.

== Books ==
- The Ideals of the East (London: J. Murray, 1903)
- The Awakening of Japan (New York: Century, 1904)
- The Book of Tea (New York: Putnam's, 1906)

== See also ==
- das in-der-Welt-sein
- Tomonobu Imamichi
- Rokkakudō
- Teaism
- Tenshin Memorial Museum of Art, Ibaraki

== Additional sources ==
- "We Must Do a Better Job of Explaining Japan to the World". Asahi Shimbun, August 12, 2005.
- Benfey, Christopher. The Great Wave: Gilded Age Misfits, Japanese Eccentrics, and the Opening of Old Japan. New York: Random House, 2003. ISBN 0-375-50327-7.
- Bharucha, Rustom. Another Asia: Rabindranath Tagore and Okakura Tenshin. New York: Oxford University Press, 2006. ISBN 0-19-568285-8.
- Okakura Kakuzo, The Illustrated Book of Tea. Chiang Mai: Cognoscenti Books. 2012. ASIN: B009033C6M.
- Westin, Victoria. Japanese Painting and National Identity: Okakura Tenshin and His Circle. Center for Japanese Studies University of Michigan (2003). ISBN 1-929280-17-3.
