= National patrimony =

National patrimony is the store of wealth or accumulated reserves of a national economy. In addition to monetary reserves and other financial holdings, national patrimony also encompasses a nation's non-monetary wealth or reserves, such as its national monuments, cuisine, and artistic heritage.

National patrimony is related to—but not synonymous with—the concepts of national essence and national heritage. National patrimony more strongly reflects a nation's assets (physical, intellectual, monetary, etc.) than a spirit of cultural unity, although the assets themselves may indeed embody or contribute to such a unifying spirit.

== China ==
In Chinese, the term "national essence" is translated as guocui 國粹, and the journal Guocui xuebao 國粹學報 (Journal of National Essence) was established in 1905 with the aim of preserving and protecting China's artistic national patrimony. This journal originally was divided into seven sections, four of which were topical in nature and represented specific aspects of what might be considered China's "national essence" and, by extension, national patrimony:

- Politics (zhengpian 政篇)
- History (shipian 史篇)
- Teaching and learning (xuepian 學篇, or more literally "approaches to study")
- Literature (wenpian 文篇)

Two years after the journal's initial publication, two additional topical sections were added:

- Art (Meishu 美術)
- Natural Science (Bowu 博物, literally, "knowledge about things")

== Japan ==
In Japanese, the term "national essence" is translated as kokusui, and the term kokusui hozon 國粹保存 is translated as "preserving the national essence."

In response to increasing Western influence in the late 19th and early 20th centuries, a growing sense of Japanese nationalism led in 1889 to the establishment of three institutions aimed at protecting and preserving artistic aspects of the country's national patrimony:

- The Imperial Museum (Teikoku Hakubutsukan 帝国博物館) - later renomed Tokyo Imperial Household Museum (東京帝室博物館)
  - Imperial Museum of Kyoto (帝国京都博物館)
  - Imperial Nara Museum (帝国奈良博物館)
- The Tokyo School of Fine Arts (Tōkyō Bijutsu Gakkō 東京美術学校), and
- The art journal Kokka (国華)
