= Tenshin Memorial Museum of Art, Ibaraki =

Tenshin Memorial Museum of Art
- 茨城県天心記念五浦美術館
- Established: 8 November 1997
- Location: 2083 Tsubaki, Otsu-cho, Kitaibaraki-shi, Ibaraki-ken, Japan
- Coordinates: 36°50′22.1″N 140°47′58″E
- Type: Modern Art, Nihonga
- Owner: Ibaraki Prefecture
- Parking: 125 cars, 10 buses
- Website: www.rekishikan.museum.ibk.ed.jp/index.htm
- Building details

Technical details
- Floor area: 5,850 m^{2}

The Tenshin Memorial Museum of Art, Ibaraki (茨城県天心記念五浦美術館, Ibaraki-ken Tenshin Kinen Izura Bijutsukan) opened in Kitaibaraki, Ibaraki Prefecture, Japan in 1997. It has a memorial room dedicated to Okakura Tenshin and his works and displays other items of Japanese art, especially by the artists of the Izura coast.

== See also ==
- Rokkakudō
- Nihon Bijutsuin
