= International Institute of Philosophy =

International scientific body

The International Institute of Philosophy (French: Institut International de Philosophie, IIP) is an international body of leading philosophers, named by election only, and limited by statute to 115 members.

It has counted among its members Jean-Paul Sartre, Bertrand Russell, Sarvepalli Radhakrishnan, Georg Henrik von Wright, Philippa Foot, Bernard Williams, Jean Wahl, Peter Strawson, Jan Patocka, Theodor Oizerman, Karl Löwith, Raymond Klibansky, Tomonobu Imamichi, Giovanni Gentile, Hans-Georg Gadamer, Chen Bo, and Ruth Barcan Marcus.

== History ==
The institute was founded in 1937 by representatives of the Sorbonne and Lund University, with its headquarters in Paris. The founding president was Léon Robin; The two most particularly proactive founders and vice presidents were Åke Petzäll (Sweden) and Raymond Bayer (France).

== Organization ==
There is a president, elected for three years, and two vice-presidents. Together with three assessors, they represent the academy on the board and externally. Pierre Aubenque (1929–2020) was the long-time (re-electable) Secretary General. The current Secretary General is Pascal Engel (Paris IV / EHESS).

Members are co-opted based on suggestions from members from different nations. From countries with larger philosophical traditions, from five (Germany) to nine (France) philosophers are members of the Academy, while smaller countries are usually represented by one or two members. At present, just over a hundred members come from almost 40 countries.

== Tasks ==
The task of the commissions and the board of the Academy primarily includes international philosophical communication and cooperation under the guiding principles of reason and tolerance as well as the mutual opening of cultures, traditions and attitudes and the dialogue with art, literature, science and technology and business. The academy publishes overview works on philosophical areas, bibliographies as well as chronicles and congress reports.

== Honorary presidents ==
- Jerzy Pelc (Poland)
- Georg Henrik von Wright (Finland), President 1975–1977
- David Pears (Great Britain), President 1988–1990
- Ruth Barcan Marcus (USA)
- Evandro Agazzi (Italy)
- Tomonobu Imamichi (Japan), President 1997–1990
- Jaakko Hintikka (Finland), President 1993–1996
- Anne Fagot-Largeault (France)
- Hans Lenk (Germany), President 2005–2008
- Tomás Calvo-Martinez (Spain), 2008–2011
- Mircea Dumitru (Romania), 2017–2020
- Jure Zovko (Croatia), 2021–
