= Yamamoto Hōsui =

Japanese artist

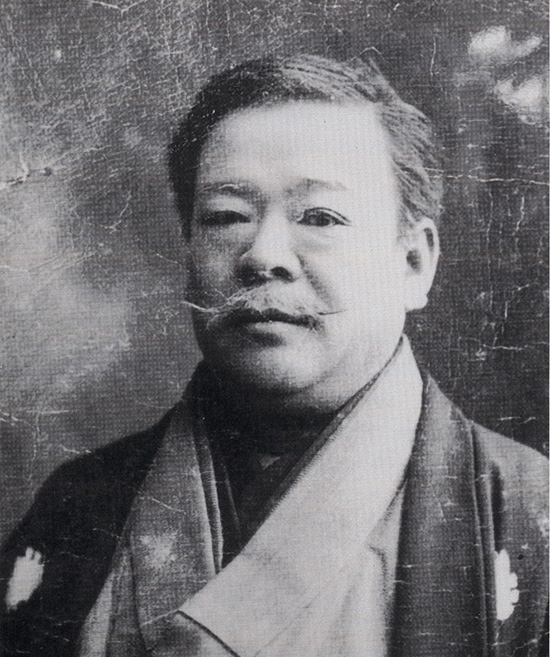
- Born: August 12, 1850; Japan、Ena District, Gifu
- Died: November 15, 1906 (aged 56); Japan、Tokyo
- Education: Antonio Fontanesi
- Known for: Painting

Hosui Yamamoto (山本 芳翠, Yamamoto Hōsui; August 12, 1850 – November 15, 1906) was a Japanese artist. He is also sometimes known as Yamamoto Tamenosuke.

== Biography ==
He was born in Mino Province. He first trained in the Nanga (Bunjinga) style before studying Western painting with Charles Wirgman and Goseda Horyu (1827–92) and under Antonio Fontanesi. Yamamoto then went to Paris, where he remained for over ten years and studied at the school of Fine Arts as Gérôme’s student 1878-1887. While in Paris he mixed with the city's artists and intelligentsia, and he supplied work for the illustrated edition of Robert de Montesquiou's Les chauves-souris.

Returning to Japan he opened a painting academy, the Seikokan, in Tokyo, teaching the French style of the Barbizon school. This was later renamed the Tenshin Dojo after his friend and fellow-artist Kuroda Seiki returned to Japan and joined him in teaching there, introducing the techniques of plein-air painting.

Among his works are Junishi (1892), a cycle of twelve oil paintings in the Western style based on the theme of the signs of the Chinese zodiac (ten of which are extant).

== Gallery ==
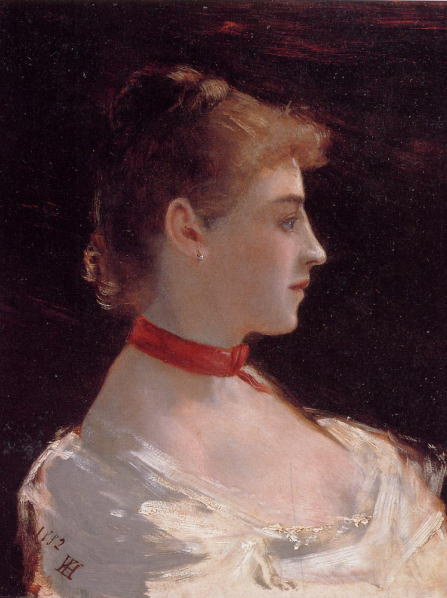
portrait of Judith Gautier

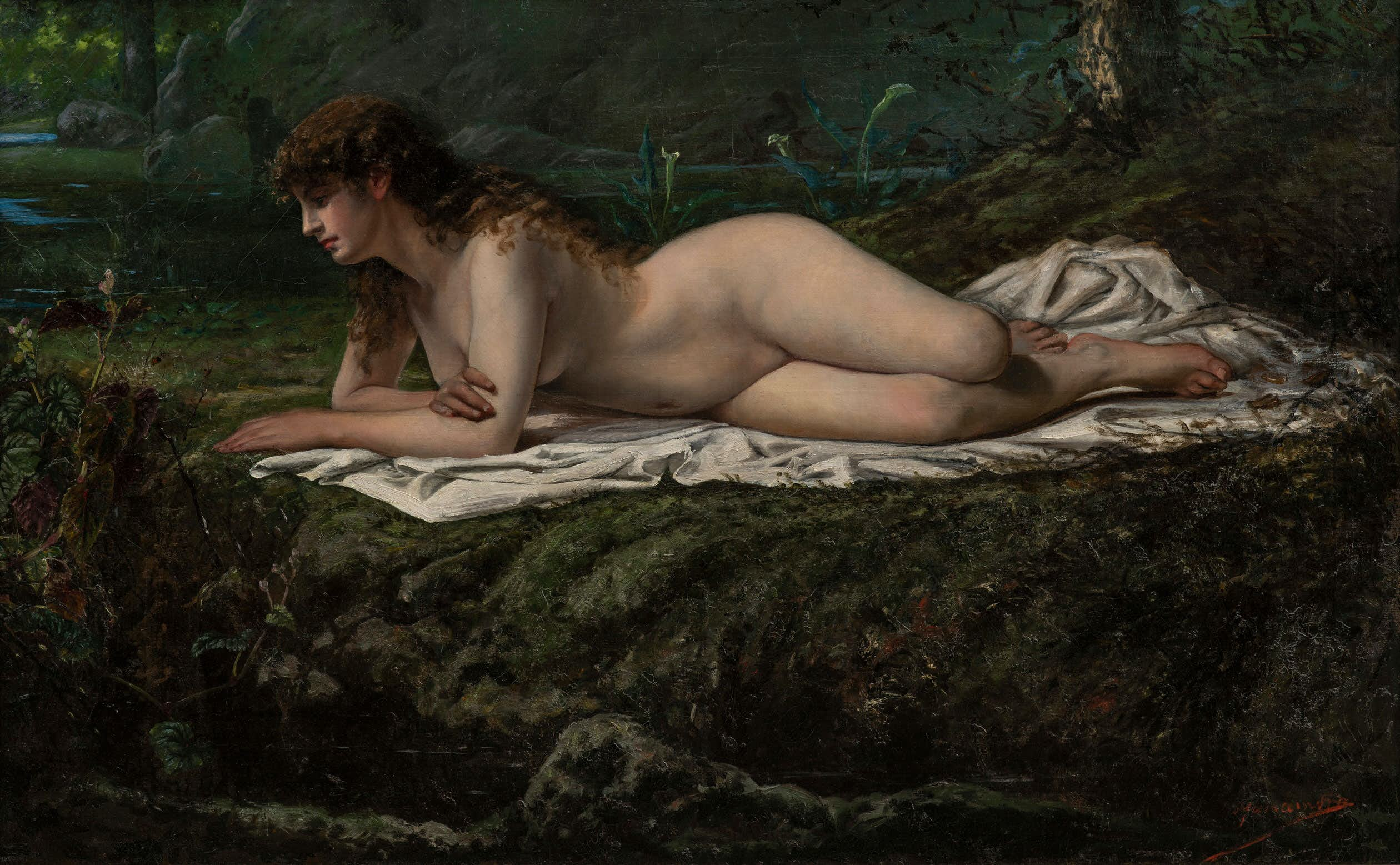
Painting of female nude

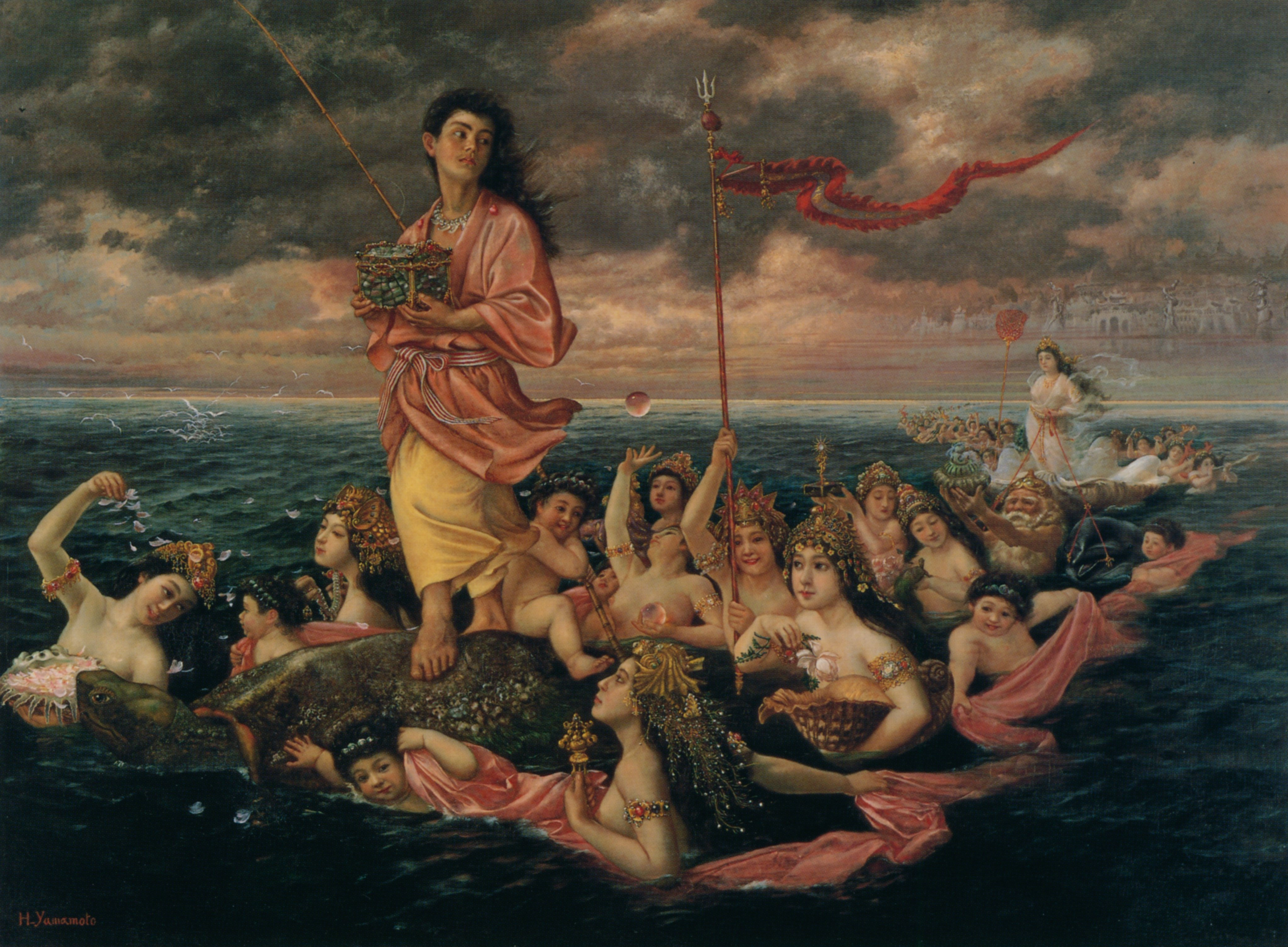
Urashima-zu

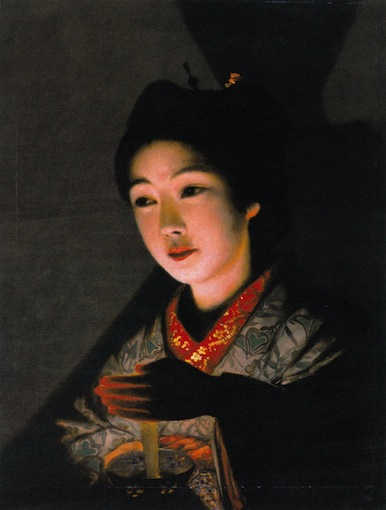
Young girl having a candle
