= Kuroda Seiki =

Japanese artist (1866–1924)

Viscount Kuroda Seiki
- 黒田 清輝
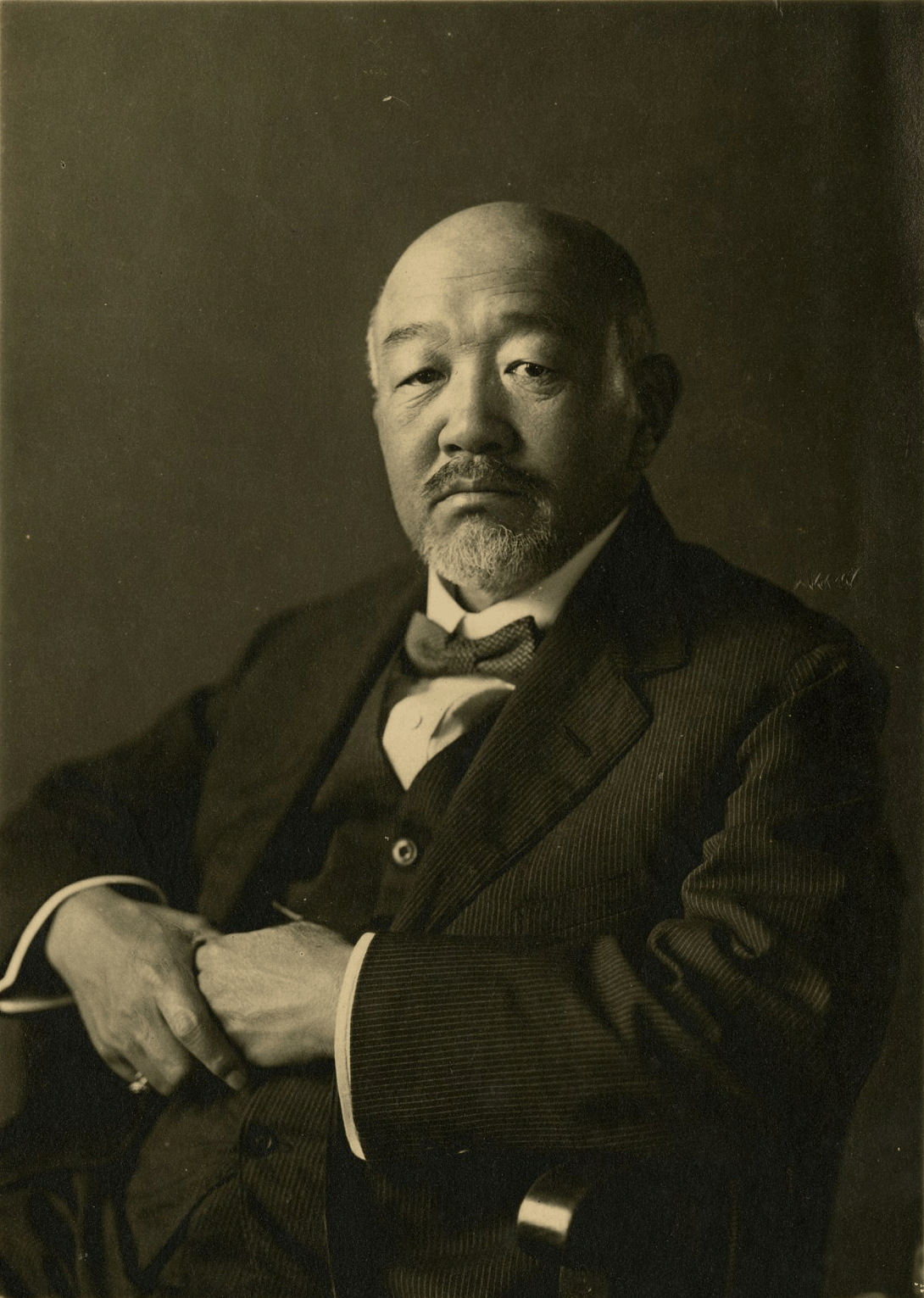
- Kuroda Seiki before 1923

Member of the House of Peers
- In office 20 March 1920 – 15 July 1924 Elected by the Viscounts

Personal details
- Born: Kuroda Shintarō; 9 August 1866 Kagoshima, Satsuma, Japan
- Died: 15 July 1924 (aged 57) Tokyo, Japan
- Known for: Painter
- Movement: Yōga

Viscount Kuroda Kiyoteru or Seiki (黒田 清輝; Japanese pronunciation: [kɯꜜ.ɾo.da | kʲi.joꜜ.te.ɾɯ, -(|) kʲi.jo-], 9 August 1866 – 15 July 1924) was a Japanese painter and teacher, noted for bringing Western art theory and practice to a wide Japanese audience.

He was among the leaders of the yōga (or Western-style) movement in late 19th and early 20th-century Japanese painting, and has come to be remembered in Japan as "the father of Western-style painting".

== Biography ==
=== Early years ===
Kuroda was born in Takamibaba, Satsuma Domain (present day Kagoshima Prefecture), as the son of a samurai of the Shimazu clan, Kuroda Kiyokane and his wife Yaeko. At birth, the boy was named Shintarō; this was changed to Seiki in 1877, when he was 11. In his personal life, he used the name Kuroda Kiyoteru, which uses an alternate pronunciation of the same Chinese characters.

Even before his birth, Kuroda had been chosen by his paternal uncle, Kuroda Kiyotsuna, as heir; formally, he was adopted in 1871, after traveling to Tokyo with both his birth mother and adoptive mother to live at his uncle's estate. Kiyotsuna was also a Shimazu retainer, whose services to Emperor Meiji in the Bakumatsu period and at the Battle of Toba–Fushimi led to his appointment to high posts in the new imperial government; in 1887 he was named a viscount. Because of his position, the elder Kuroda was exposed to many of the modernizing trends and ideas coming into Japan during the early Meiji era; as his heir, young Kiyoteru also learned from them and took his lessons to heart.

In his early teens, Kuroda began to learn the English language in preparation for his university studies; within two years, however, he had chosen to switch to French instead. At 17, he enrolled in pre-college courses in French, as preparation for his planned legal studies in college. Consequently, when in 1884 Kuroda's brother-in-law Hashiguchi Naouemon was appointed to the French Legation, it was decided that Kuroda would accompany him and his wife to Paris to begin his real studies of law. He arrived in Paris on 18 March 1884, and was to remain there for the next decade.

=== Studies in France ===
Kuroda had received painting lessons in his youth, and had been given a watercolor set by his adoptive mother as a present upon leaving for Paris, but he had never considered painting as anything more than a hobby. However, in February 1886 Kuroda was attending a party at the Japanese Legation for Japanese nationals in Paris; here, he met the painters Yamamoto Hōsui and Fuji Masazō, as well as art dealer Tadamasa Hayashi, a specialist in ukiyo-e. All three urged the young student to turn to painting, saying that he could better help his country by learning to paint like a Westerner rather than learning law. Kuroda agreed, and began formally studying art at a studio while simultaneously continuing his studies in law in an effort to please his adoptive father. This situation proved untenable, however, and Kuroda finally succeeded in convincing his father to allow him to abandon his legal studies and study painting full time. In May 1886, Kuroda entered the studio of Raphaël Collin, a noted Academic painter who had shown work in several Paris Salons. Kuroda also received guidance from Pierre Puvis de Chavannes, who influenced Kuroda's later use of the human body to represent abstract concepts.

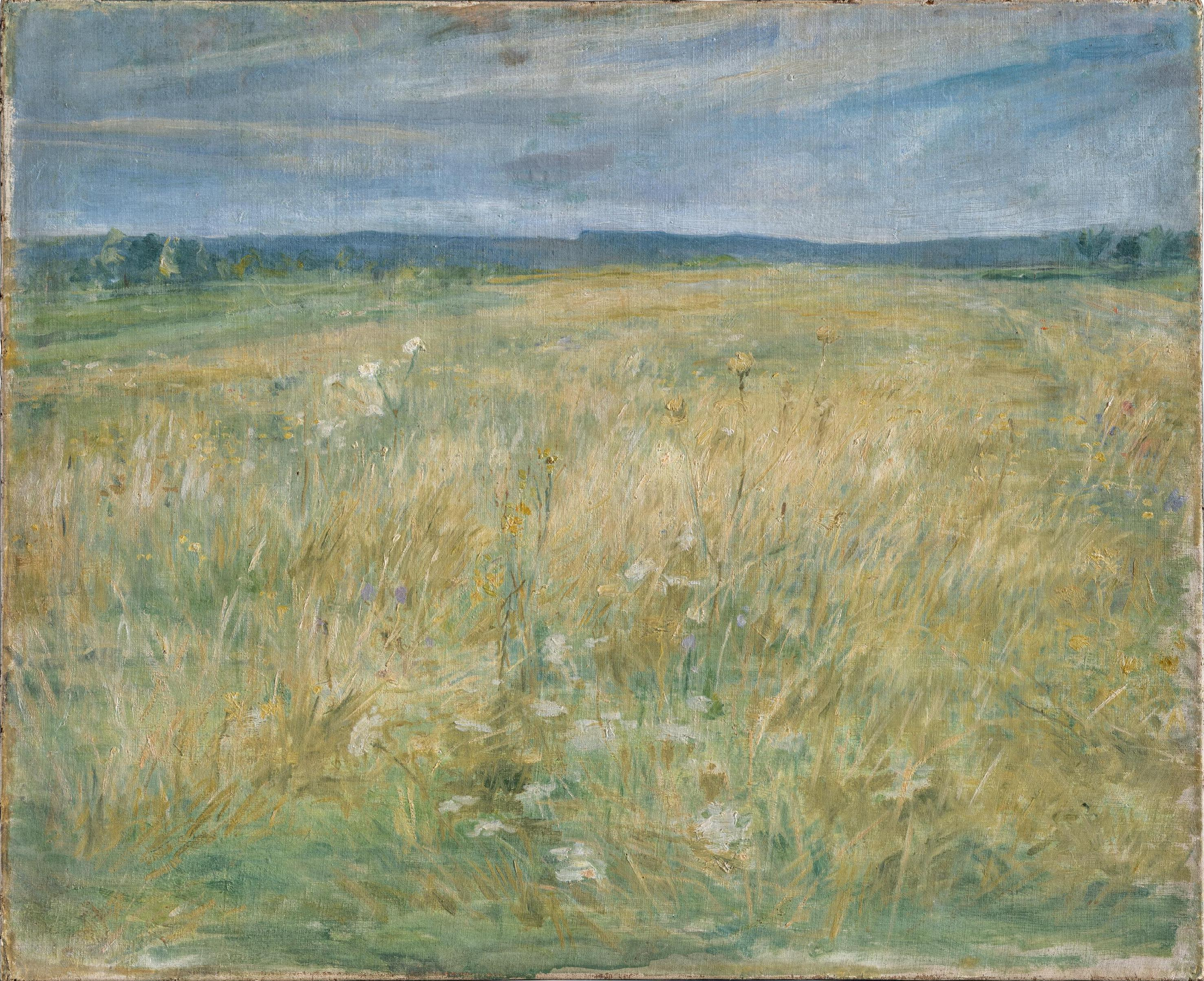
Kuroda Seiki, Withered Field (Grez), c.1891, Kuroda Memorial Hall, Tokyo

In 1886, Kuroda met another young Japanese painter, Kume Keiichiro, newly arrived in France, who also joined Collin's studio. The two became friends, and soon became roommates as well. It was during these years that he began to mature as a painter, first following the traditional course of study in Academic studio art before eventually also encountering plein-air painting. In 1890 Kuroda moved from Paris to the village of Grez-sur-Loing, an artists' colony about 70 kilometers south of the city, which had been formed by painters from the United States and from northern Europe. It was at Grez-sur-Loing that Kuroda first began to experiment with plein-air techniques, discovering inspiration in the rural landscape, as well as a young woman, Maria Billault, who became one of his favorite models.

In 1893 Kuroda returned to Paris and began work on his most important painting to date, Morning Toilette, which would later become the first nude painting to be publicly exhibited in Japan. This large-scale work, which was destroyed in World War II, was accepted with great praise by the Académie des Beaux-Arts; Kuroda intended to bring it with him to Japan to shatter the Japanese prejudice against the depiction of the nude figure. With the painting in hand, he set out for home via the United States, arriving in July 1893.

=== Back in Japan ===
Having spent many long years of study in France to gain mastery of Western-style painting, Kuroda was eager to try out his newfound skills on the landscapes of his home country. Soon after arriving back in Japan, Kuroda traveled to Kyoto for the first time in his life, and used plein-air techniques to depict famous local sights, such as geisha and ancient temples. Paintings inspired by this trip include Maiko (1893, Tokyo National Museum) and Talk on Ancient Romance (1898, destroyed).

When Kuroda returned to Japan, the best-known society for Western-style painting was the Meiji Fine Art Society (Meiji Bijutsukai [ja]), which was strongly under the influence of European Academicism and the Barbizon School, which had been introduced to Japan by the Italian artist Antonio Fontanesi at the government-funded Technical Fine Arts School [it] (Kōbu Bijutsu Gakkō) beginning in 1876. Kuroda submitted several of his paintings to the Meiji Fine Arts Society's annual exhibition, which exhibited nine of his works in 1894. His innovative painting style, heavily influenced by the latest European plein air and Impressionist techniques, shocked Japanese audiences. For example, the art critic Takayama Chogyū wrote that anyone who found this type of painting beautiful must have "poor eyesight." However, many younger artists found Kuroda's innovative style inspiring and flocked to become his students. In particular, Kuroda's style of bright color tones emphasizing the changes of light and atmosphere was considered revolutionary. Kobayashi Mango, one of Kuroda's students from this time, recalled that when Kuroda returned to Japan, it was as if "those who had been groping along a wild dark path suddenly became aware of a single ray of brightness."

In 1894, Yamamoto Hōsui, one of the artists who had encouraged Kuroda to study art in France, handed over control of the art school he had founded, the Seikōkan (生巧館), to Kuroda, who inherited all of Yamamoto's students. Kuroda renamed the school Tenshin Dōjō (天心道場) and remodeled its pedagogy to focus on Western precepts and plein-air painting.

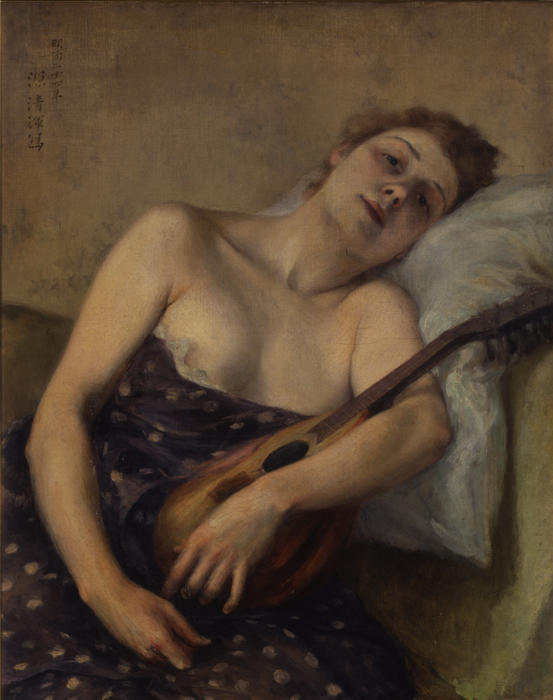
Woman Holding a Mandolin, 1891

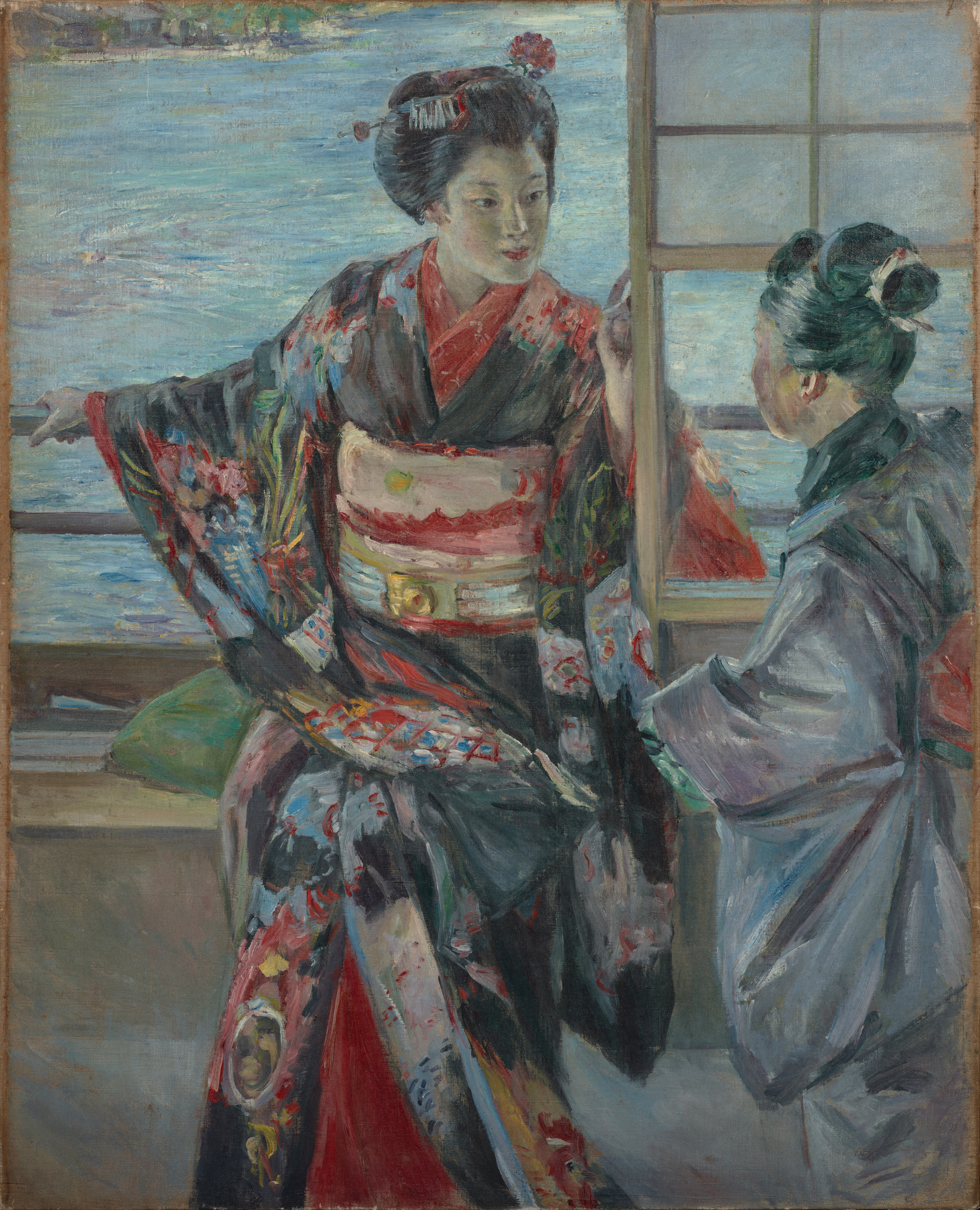
Maiko, 1893

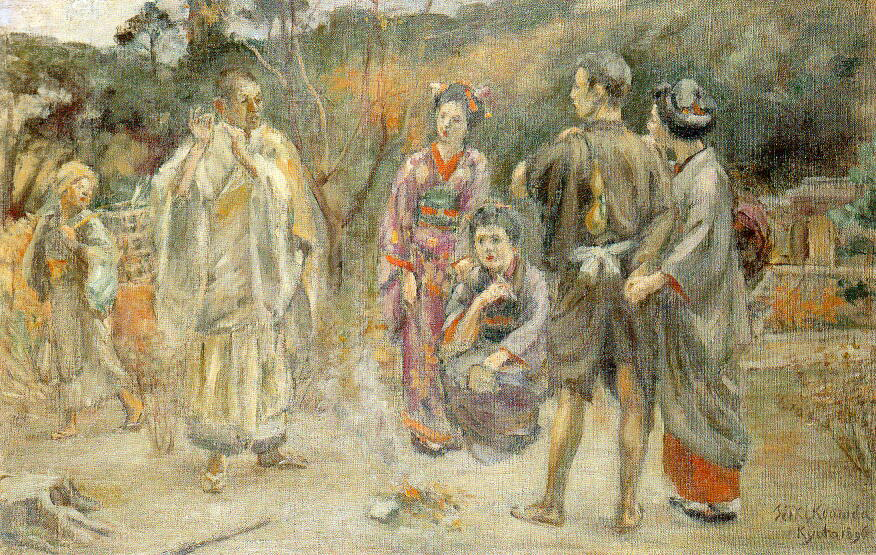
Study for Talk on Ancient Romance (Composition II), 1896

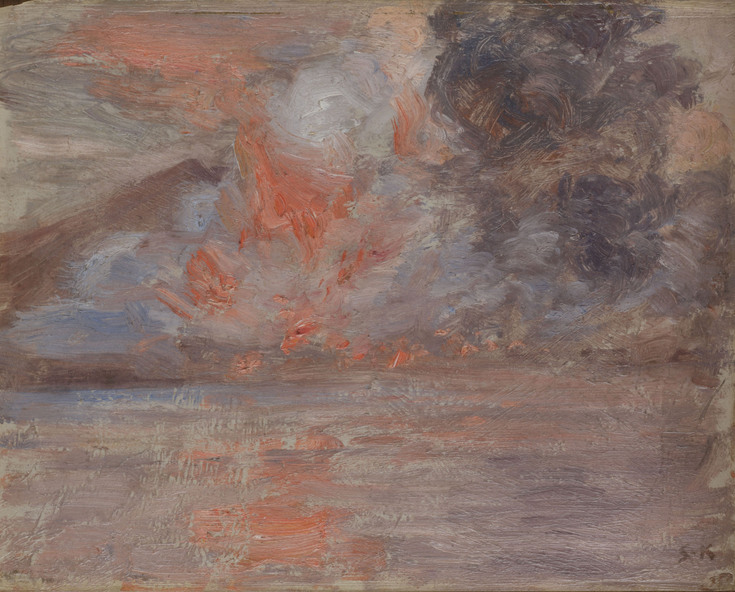
Eruption, 1914, one of six paintings in the series "Sakurajima Erupting"

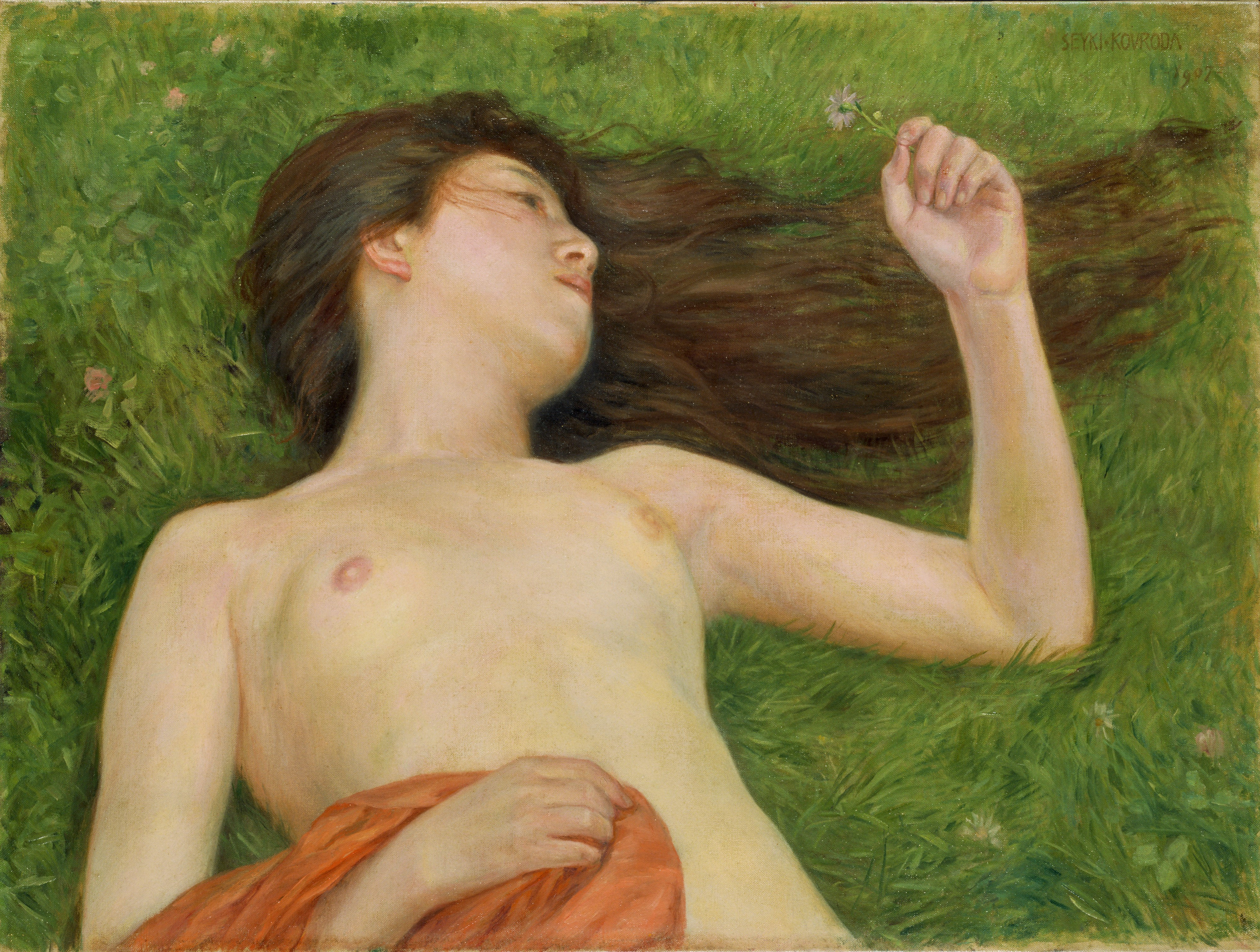
The Fields, 1907

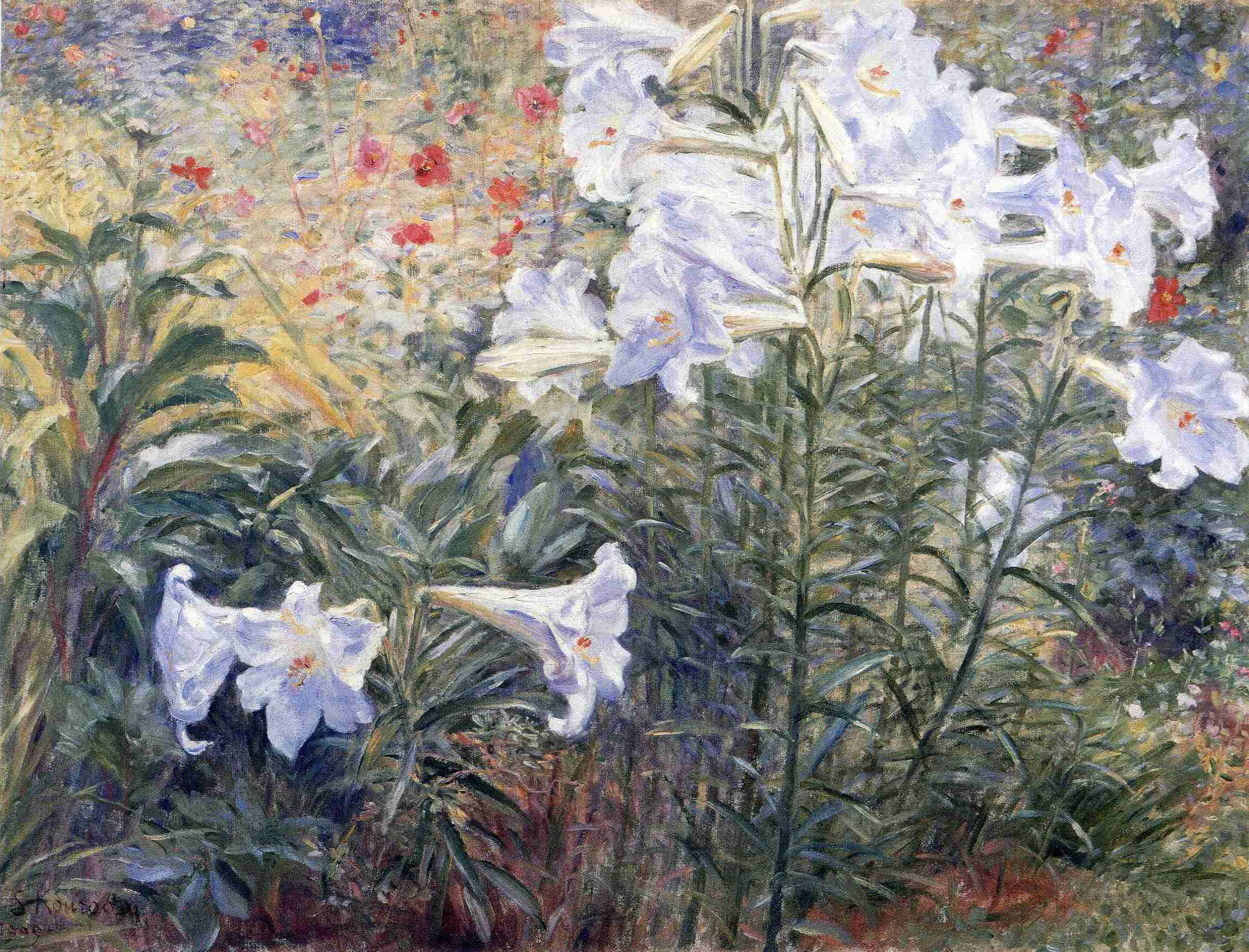
Lilies, 1909

=== Controversy ===
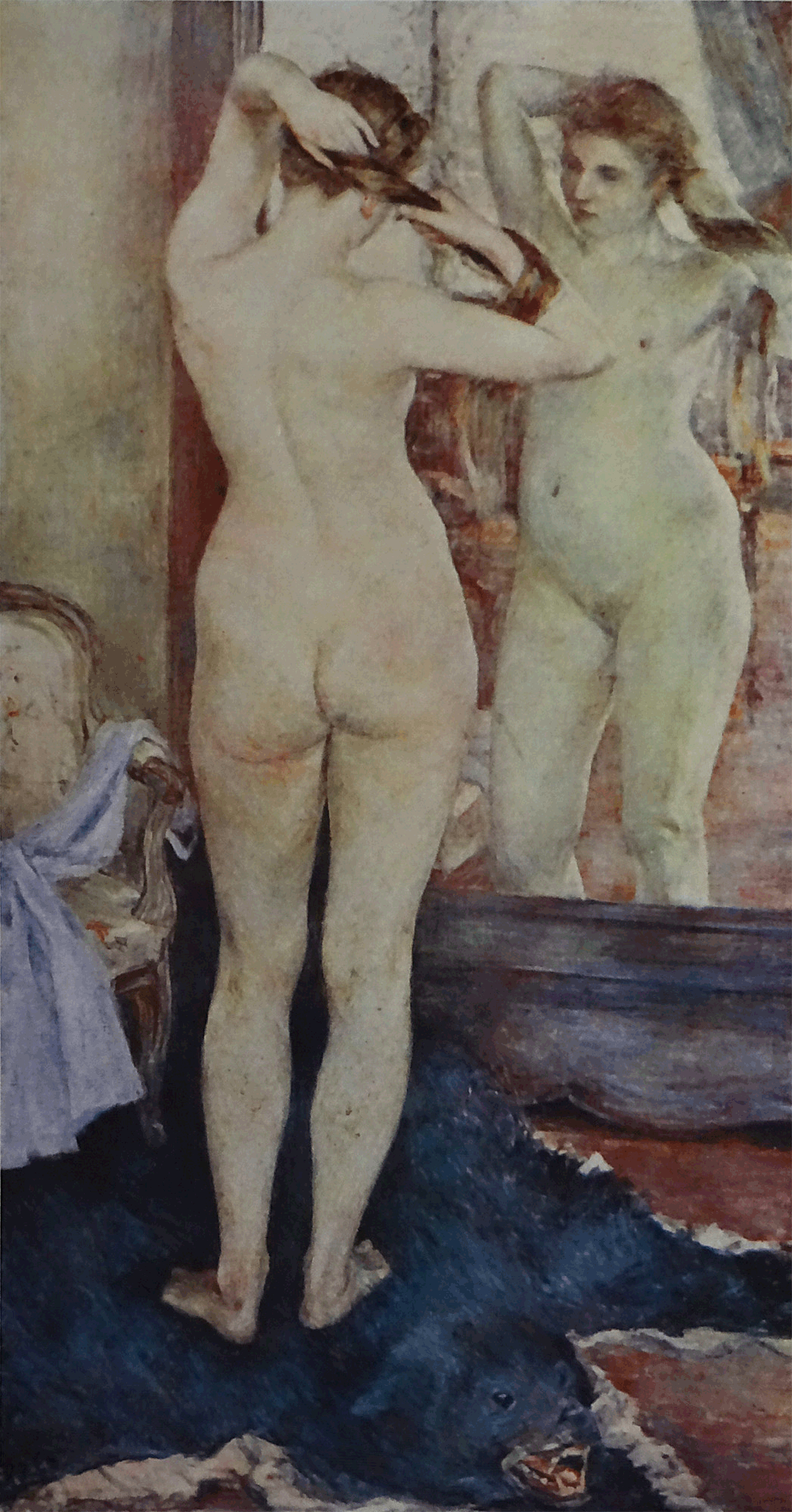
Morning Toilette (destroyed during World War II)

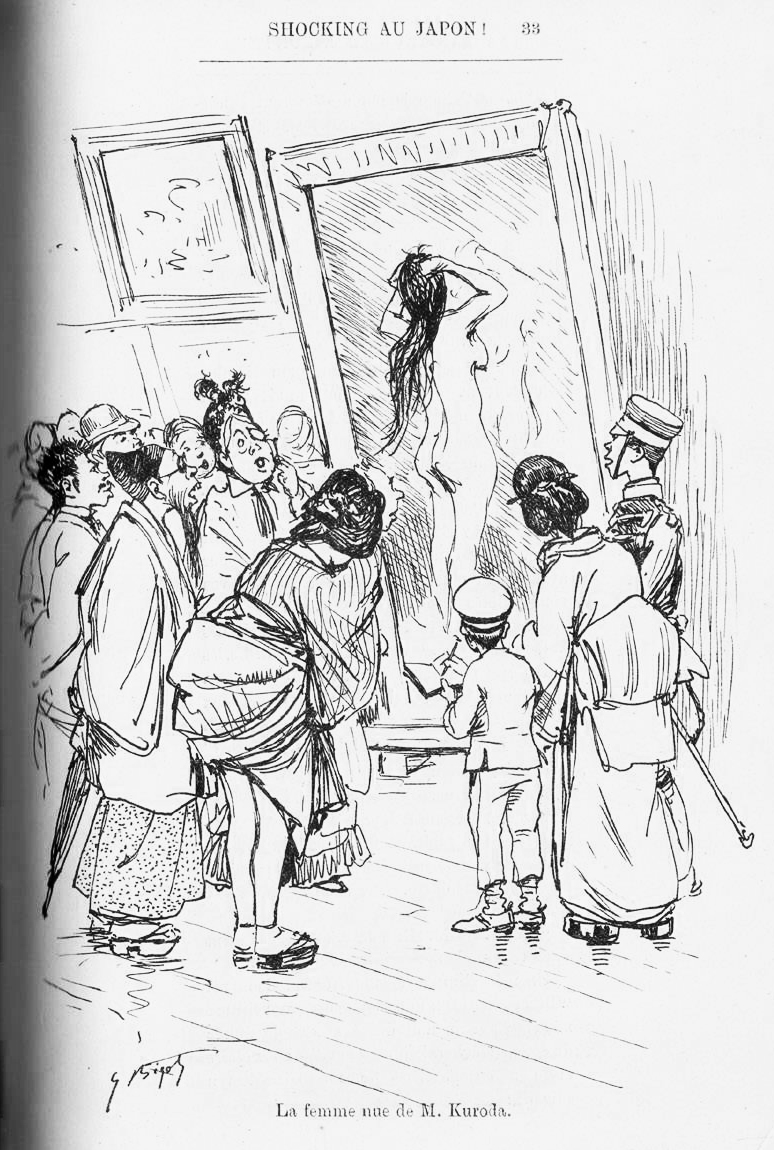
Cartoon of the scandal by Bigot

In April 1895, Kuroda helped to organize the Fourth National Industrial Exhibition, held in Kyoto; he also submitted Morning Toilette for exhibition in the same venue. Although he was awarded a prize for the painting, the exhibition of a picture of a nude woman before so many visitors outraged many, and led to a furor in the press where critics condemned the perceived flouting of social standards. None criticized the technical aspects of the painting, choosing instead to lambaste Kuroda for its subject matter. Kume, Kuroda's friend from his Paris days, wrote a spirited defense of the nude figure in art for newspaper publication, but this helped little. For his part, Kuroda maintained a public silence on the issue; privately, however, he expressed the opinion that morally, at least, he had won the day.

Further controversy erupted in October of the same year, when Kuroda exhibited 21 of his works done in Europe at the 7th Exhibition of the Meiji Fine Art Society. Kume also entered some of his work in the exhibition, as did several of Kuroda's students from the Tenshin Dōjō. Visitors were struck by the vast differences between Kuroda's plein-air-derived style and the more formal work of the other artists, leading critics to focus on the difference as one between the old and the new. Some even went so far as to suggest a factional rivalry between two "schools" of painting, an "Old School," represented by the Meiji Fine Art Society and the "New School," represented by Kuroda and his students.

Displeased by the bureaucratic methods inherent in the hierarchy of the Meiji Fine Art Society, Kuroda withdrew from the society in June 1896 and founded his own, rival art society, along with Kume and a number of their students. The new group was christened the "White Horse Society" (白馬会, Hakubakai), after a brand of unrefined sake they favored called "White Horse" (白馬, Shirouma). The White Horse Society had no set rules; rather, it was a free, equal gathering of like-thinking artists whose only goal was to find a way for members to display their works. The group held exhibitions every year until it dissolved in 1911; in total, thirteen shows were held. A number of prominent artists received their first public exposure in these exhibitions; among them were Fujishima Takeji and Aoki Shigeru.

=== Academic career ===
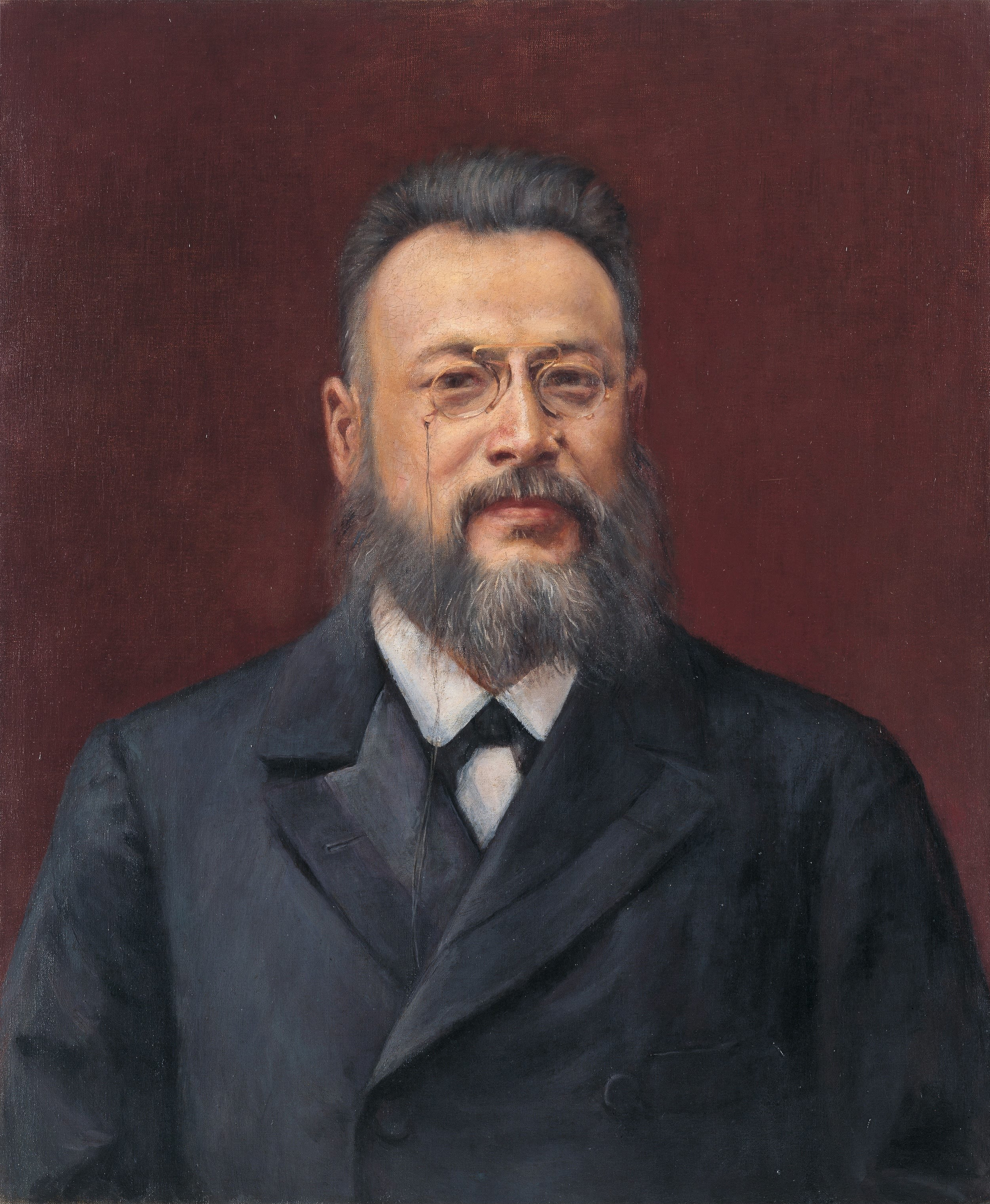
Portrait of the physicist Kitao Jirō (北尾次郎), 1908

By 1896, Kuroda was at the peak of his career. That May Okakura Tenshin, the Dean of the Tokyo School of Fine Arts (Tokyo Bijutsu Gakkō, present-day Tokyo National University of Fine Arts and Music), appointed Kuroda as the director of the newly established Department of Western-style Painting. This allowed him to design an even broader curriculum, meant for general students of art, and to be better equipped to reach a broader public. An academic role, with its emphasis on structure and conformity, contrasted with the painter's focus on individuality, but Kuroda nonetheless approached his new role with zeal. In particular, Kuroda stressed the importance of painting outdoors directly from nature (plein air), and insisted that courses in anatomy and the sketching of a live nude model be included in the curriculum.

Ultimately, Kuroda set as his goal the teaching of history painting, feeling that it was the most important genre for students to learn. In his opinion, paintings depicting myths, history, or themes such as love or courage, in which figures painted in poses and compositions reflecting these issues had the highest social value. Coinciding with this was the creation of one of his most ambitious works, the Talk on Ancient Romance. The painting was a large undertaking; it seems to have been among the first for which Kuroda employed charcoal drawings and oil sketches. He would go on to employ this technique in most of his later work, teaching it to his students as well. Talk on Ancient Romance appears to have been intended as a wall panel; as with much of Kuroda's work, it was destroyed during World War II, leaving only preparatory studies to indicate its possible grandeur.

=== Later career ===
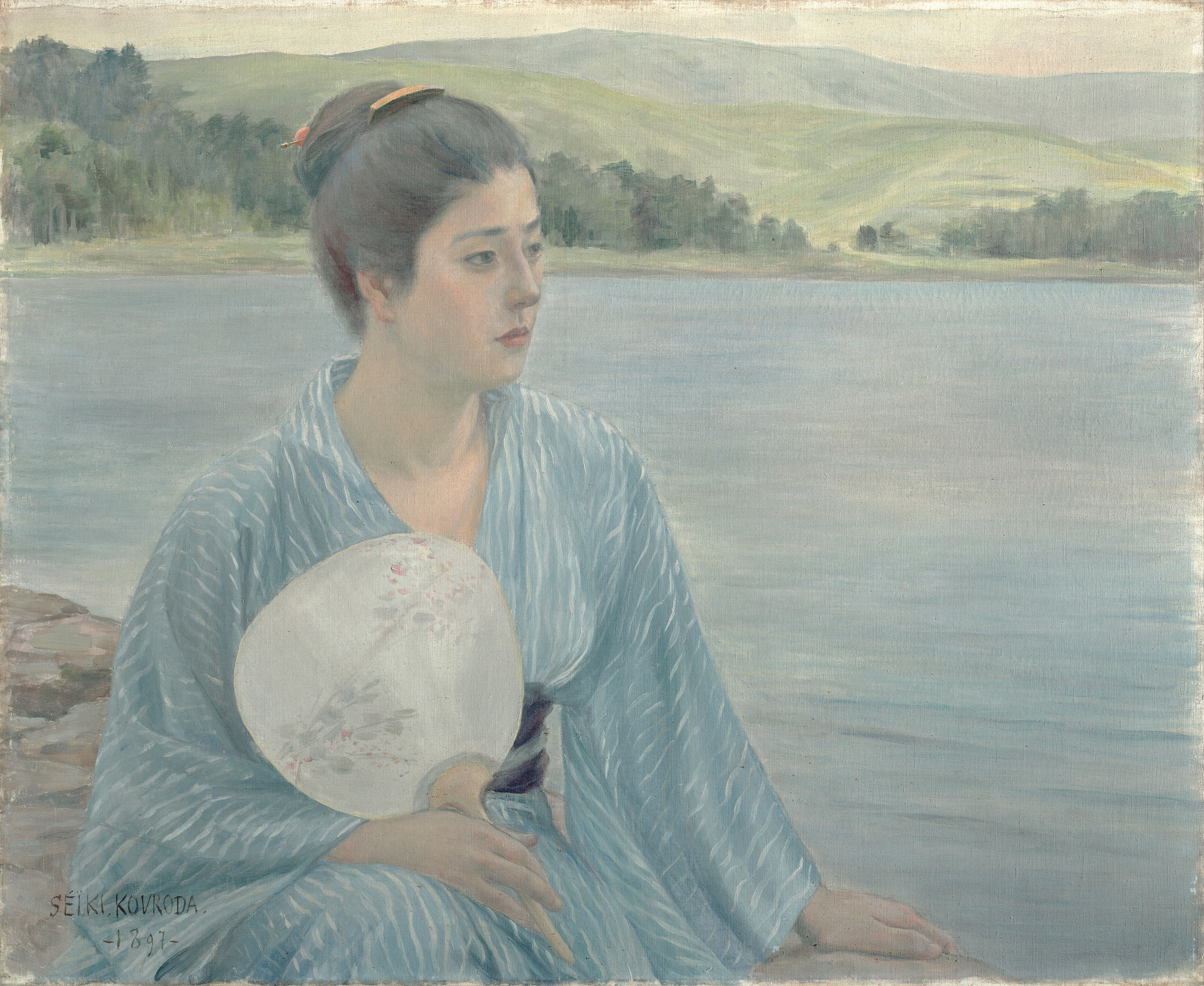
Kuroda Seiki, Lakeside, 1897, Kuroda Memorial Hall, Tokyo

Kuroda was by this time well-regarded not only by the Japanese, but by the art world at large; his triptych Wisdom, Impression, Sentiment (completed 1900) was exhibited alongside his 1897 work Lakeside at the Exposition Universelle held in 1900 in Paris; it received a silver medal. Lakeside, however, is arguably Kuroda's most famous and recognizable work in Japan. It depicts Kuroda's wife Teruko, seated by a lake in the famous resort town of Hakone. Lakeside represents the apotheosis of Kuroda's personal style, in which he dialed back the more controversial aspects of European Impressionism to combine it with aspects of Academicism and the Barbizon School, while emphasizing native Japanese subjects such as Japanese landscapes and clothing. The result was a hybrid style art historian Chinghsin Wu has termed "Academic Impressionism," which Kuroda thought was more palatable to Japanese tastes and sensibilities.

In 1907, members of the White Horse Society, Kuroda among them, exhibited in the first Bunten exhibition, sponsored by the Ministry of Education; their continued participation led to the disbanding of the group in 1911. Meanwhile, Kuroda had been appointed a court painter at the Imperial Court in 1910, becoming the first yōga artist so honored. From then until the end of his life his artistic activities were curtailed; he became more of a politician and an administrator, only creating small works intended for display.

In 1917, on the death of his father, Kuroda inherited the kazoku peerage title of viscount, and in 1920, was elected to a seat in the House of Peers, the upper house of the Diet of Japan. In 1922, Kuroda was made head of the Imperial Fine Arts Academy. In 1923, he was awarded the Grand Cross of the Legion d'Honneur; this followed numerous other honors from the French government in the years before. Kuroda died at home in Azabu Kōgai-chō on 15 July 1924; immediately upon his death the Japanese government conferred upon him the Order of the Rising Sun.

== Legacy ==
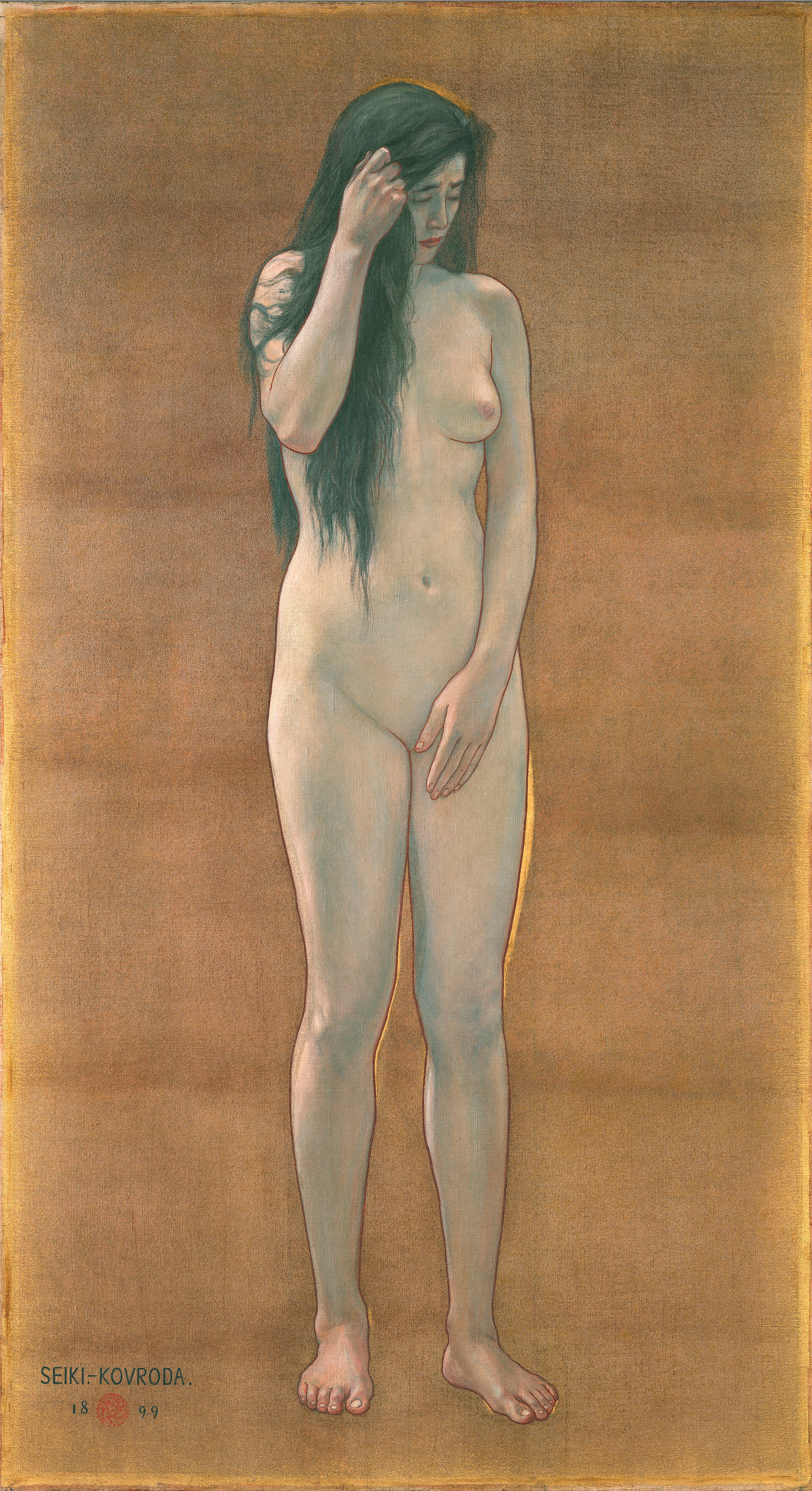
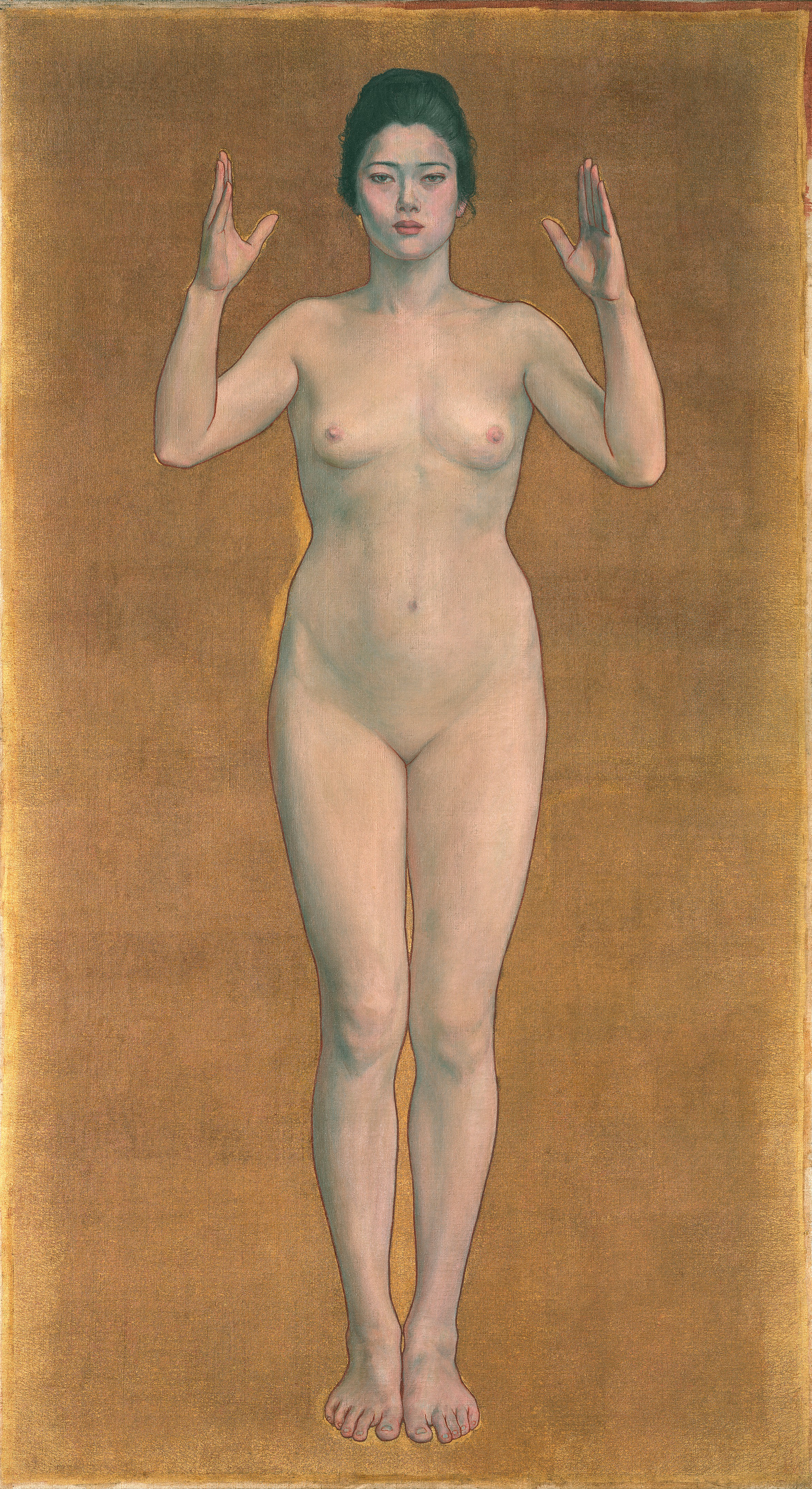
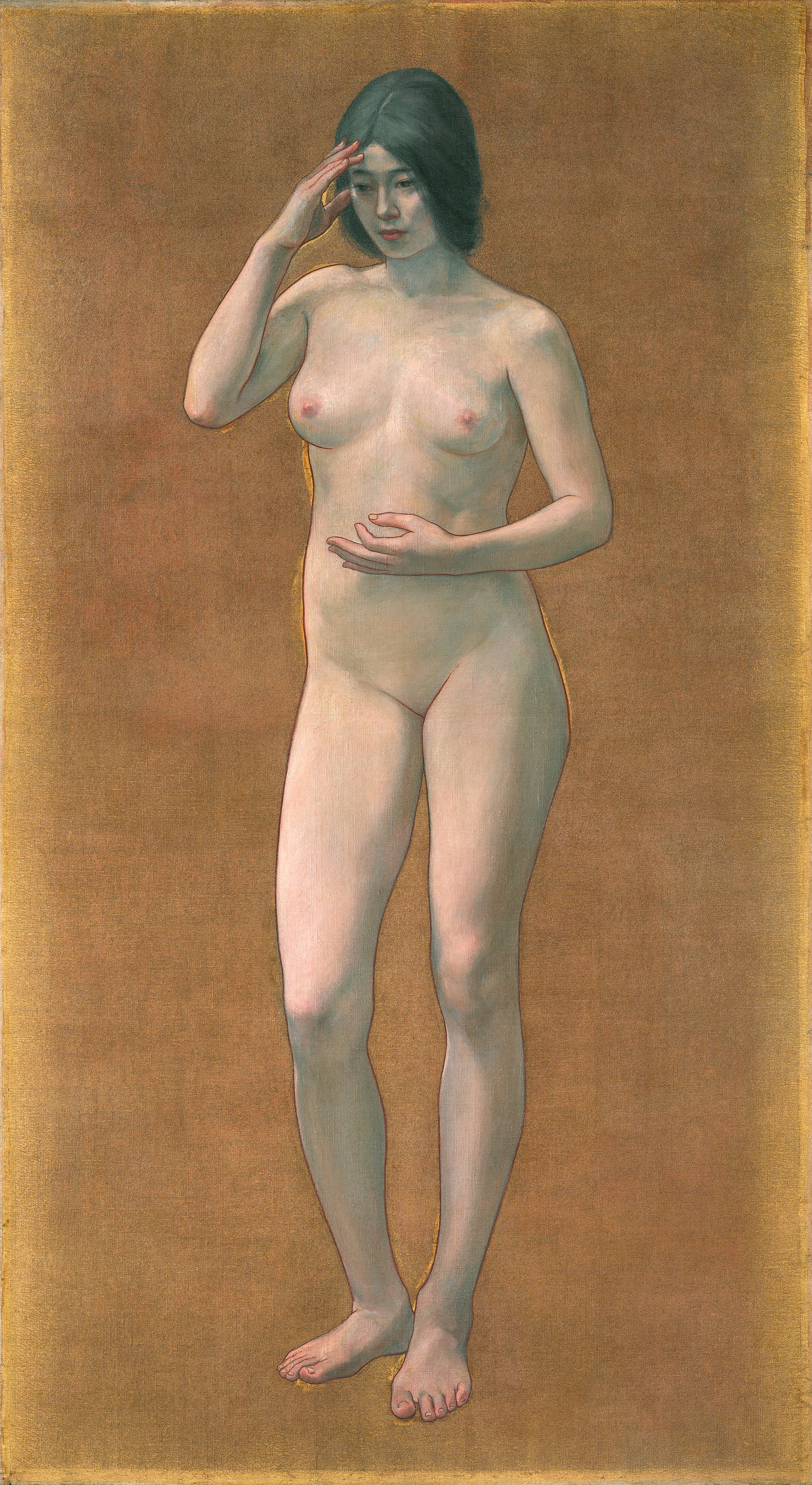
Wisdom・Impression・Sentiment (note: this is from right to left) (1899) Kuroda Memorial Hall

Kuroda had a major influence on modern Japanese art. As a painter, he was among the first to introduce Western-style paintings to a broad Japanese audience. As a teacher, he taught many young artists the lessons that he himself had learned in Paris; among his students were painters like Wada Eisaku, who were to become among the preeminent Japanese painters of their generation. Many students also followed Kuroda in choosing to study in Paris, leading to a greater awareness of broader trends in Western art on the part of many Japanese artists in the twentieth century; a number of these, such as Asai Chū, even went as far as going to Grez-sur-Loing for inspiration.

In particular, the "Academic Impressionism" style that Kuroda promoted, as exemplified in iconic paintings such as Lakeside (1897) and Lilies (1909), achieved a long-lasting predominance within Japanese art society, forming the bedrock of modern, Western-style art training and practice in Japan for many decades to come.

Perhaps Kuroda's greatest contribution to Japanese culture, however, was the broader acceptance of Western-style painting he fostered on the part of the Japanese public. Despite initial reluctance, he convinced the public to accept the validity of Western-style art theories and practices. This, coupled with the honors bestowed upon him later in his life, bespeak a broader understanding by the Japanese people, and by their government, as to the importance of yōga in their culture.

== Philately ==
Two of Kuroda's works have been selected as the subject of a commemorative postage stamps by the Japanese government:

- 1967: Lakeside, (1897), for the 1967 Philatelic Week
- 1980: Maiko (1893), for the Modern Art Series
