= The Book of Tea =

1906 long essay by Okakura Kakuzō

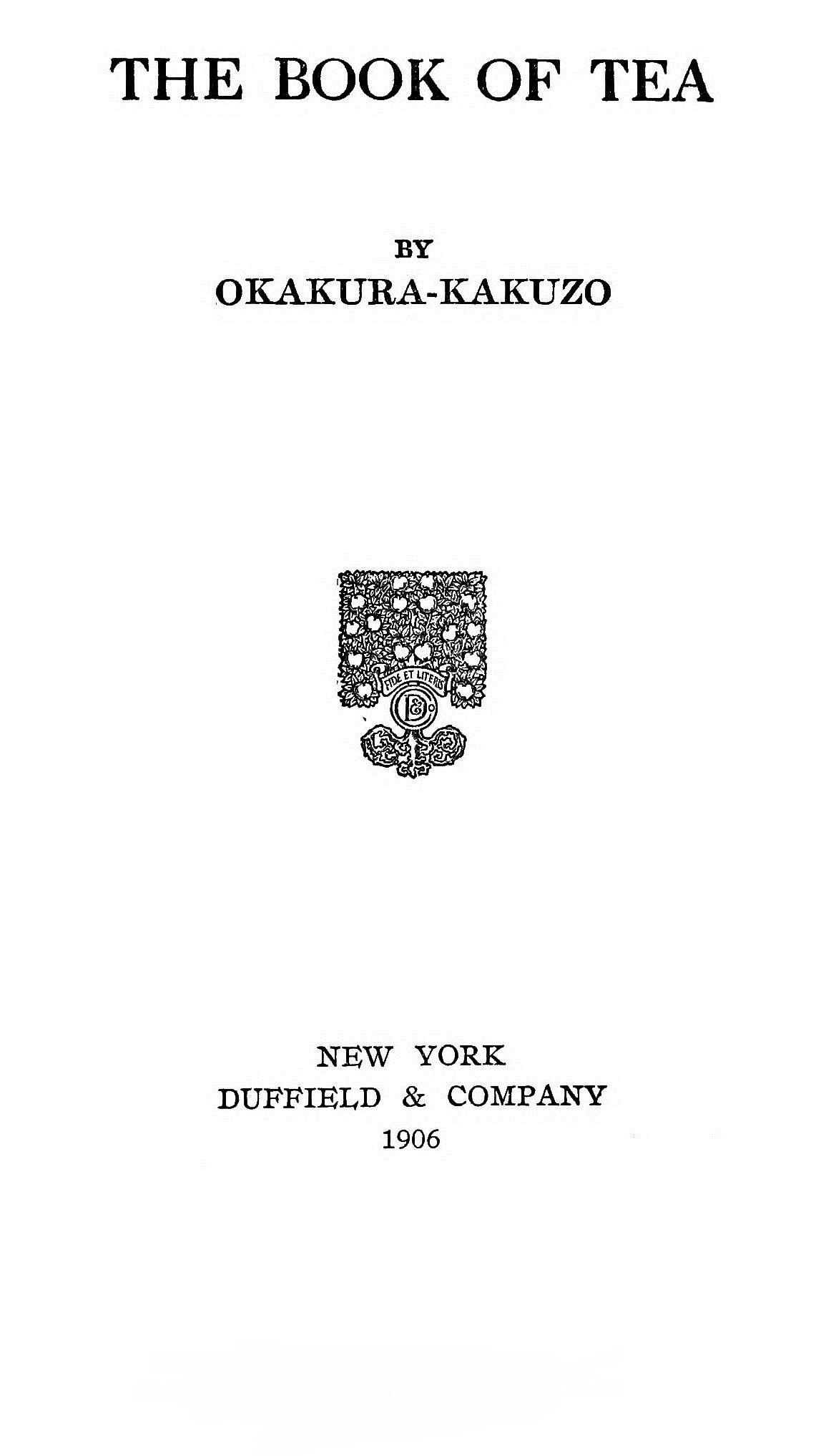
- Title page of the American edition
- Author: Okakura Kakuzō
- Language: English
- Publisher: Fox, Duffield & Company
- Publication date: 1906
- Publication place: United States
- Pages: 160
- Text: The Book of Tea at Wikisource

The Book of Tea (茶の本, Cha no Hon) by Okakura Kakuzō is a long 1906 essay linking the role of chadō (teaism) to the aesthetic and cultural aspects of Japanese life and protesting Western caricatures of "the East".

== Content ==
Addressed to a Western audience, it was originally written in English and is one of the great English tea classics. Okakura had been taught at a young age to speak English and was proficient at communicating his thoughts to the Western mind. In his book, he discusses such topics as Zen and Taoism, but also the secular aspects of tea and Japanese life. The book emphasizes how Teaism - a term he coined as an analogue to chadō - taught the Japanese many things, the most important of which were simplicity and humility:

It (Teaism) inculcates purity and harmony, the mystery of mutual charity, the romanticism of the social order. It is essentially a worship of the Imperfect, as it is a tender attempt to accomplish something possible in this impossible thing we know as life.

This, Okakura believed, was an aesthetic that should inform everything from the arts and architecture to daily life and was already informing them in Japan.

In his "sleek complacency", however, the Westerner tended to see in the tea ceremony only "another instance of the thousand and one oddities which constitute the quaintness and childishness of the East to him". Writing in the aftermath of the Russo-Japanese War, Kakuzō commented that the Westerner regarded Japan as "barbarous while she indulged in the gentle arts of peace", and began to call her civilized only when "she began to commit wholesale slaughter on the Manchurian battlefields".

In the book, Kakuzō states that Teaism, in itself, is one of the profound universal remedies in which conflicting parties might find reconciliation. He ends the book with a chapter on Tea Masters and spends some time talking about Sen no Rikyū and his contribution to the Japanese tea ceremony.

According to Tomonobu Imamichi, Heidegger's concept of Dasein in Sein und Zeit was inspired – although Heidegger remained silent on this – by Okakura Kakuzō's concept of das-in-der-Welt-sein (being-in-the-worldness) expressed in The Book of Tea to describe Zhuangzi's philosophy, which Imamichi's professor Ito Kichinosuke had offered to Heidegger in 1919, after having followed private lessons with him the year before:

Ito Kichinosuke, one of my teachers at university, studied in Germany in 1918 immediately after the First World War and hired Heidegger as a private tutor. Before moving back to Japan at the end of his studies, Professor Ito handed Heidegger a copy of Das Buch vom Tee, the German translation of Okakura Kakuzo's The Book of Tea, as a token of his appreciation. That was in 1919. Sein und Zeit (Being and Time) was published in 1927 and made Heidegger famous. Mr. Ito was surprised and indignant that Heidegger used Zhuangzi's concept without giving him credit. Years later in 1945, Professor Ito reminisced with me and, speaking in his Shonai dialect, said, "Heidegger did a lot for me, but I should've laid into him for stealing". There are other indications that Heidegger was inspired by Eastern writings, but let's leave this topic here. I have heard many stories of this kind from Professor Ito and checked their veracity. I recounted this story at a reception held after a series of lectures I gave in 1968 at the University of Heidelberg at the invitation of Hans-Georg Gadamer. Japanese exchange students attended these lectures, and I explained that there were many other elements of classical Eastern thought in Heidegger's philosophy and gave some examples. I must have said too much and may even have said that Heidegger was a plagiarist (Plagiator). Gadamer was Heidegger's favorite student, and we ended up not speaking to each other for 4 or 5 years because he was so angry with me.

The Book of Tea has been cited as an important influence on the work of Frank Lloyd Wright, Arthur Wesley Dow, Georgia O'Keeffe, and Charlotte Perriand.

== See also ==
- Tea classics
- Tea culture
