= Barbee Boys =

Japanese rock band

- Origin: Japan
- Genres: Rock
- Years active: 1982–1992, 2003, 2008–2010, 2018–present
- Labels: Epic/Sony Records, 21st. CENTURY BARBEE BOYS
- Members: KONTA (vocals, soprano sax); Kyoko (vocals); Tomotaka Imamichi (guitar); ENRIQUE (bass); Toshiaki Konuma (drums)
- Past members: Ouji Abe
- Website: 21stcentury-barbeeboys.com

Barbee Boys (バービーボーイズ, Bābī Bōizu) are a successful 1980s Japanese rock band. The band debuted in 1984 and was popular through the 1980s, becoming the first Japanese rock band to perform at the Nippon Budokan, until disbanding in 1992. After reuniting for several short periods, the band has been continually together since 2018. The five current members are: vocalist and saxophone player KONTA (real name Atsushi Kondou); female vocalist Kyoko Sekihara; lead guitarist and songwriter Tomotaka Imamichi, who has also had a career as a songwriter for other bands; bassist and pianist ENRIQUE; and drummer Toshiaki Konuma. In 2019, they announced their first release in 29 years, PlanBee, releasing on December 18 of that year.

== History ==
=== Name ===
According to the band's guitarist, Imamichi, the band's name "Barbee Boys" originated from the word "barfly", the word for a habitual patron of a bar. But, because he didn't consider the "fly" part to be very stylish, it was changed to "bee". In addition, he also said the name came from the Barbie brand of dolls, one of which KONTA purchased after a show. The "Boys" in the band name is a reference to a Japanese comedy group named City Boys. In addition, the band was initially an all male group - Kyoko joined after the band's formation. Moreover, Imamichi expressed some regret at the discrepancy of having a woman in a band with "Boys" in the name, as well as having to continue to call themselves "Boys" despite their age.

=== 1982–1992 ===
The band was formed with its original four member in July 1982, consisting of KONTA on vocals and saxophone, Tomotaka Imamichi on guitar, Ouji Abe on bass, and Toshiaki Konuma on drums. For some time after the band's formation, they did not attract many listeners to their live shows. At one point, the band attended a preview of the band Kats! TARUI BAND, which Kyoko was a member of. Imamichi witnessed how effectively Kyoko's band could draw crowds, which encouraged him to invite Kyoko to join the Barbee Boys.

At the time, Kyoko was working at a major trading firm, so by procuring show tickets for her coworkers, she was able to attract a large turnout to her performances. Additionally, female singers in rock bands were uncommon in the 80's, which attracted many curious male attendees. Kyoko was effectively poached by the Barbee Boys with the aim of attracting more viewers to shows, and her success in being a guest vocalist for the band during competitions led to the band creating a signature sound through the dual male-female vocalists. It was around this time that the band sent a demo tape to Sony. With the profile included with the tape, Kyoko's name was listed as a member. The audition went well, and it was becoming increasingly apparent to Kyoko that she had become an invaluable part of the band. As a result, she decided to officially join the Barbee Boys.

At this time, bassist Ouji Abe left the band to focus on production work. Finding a replacement bassist led to difficulties, due to stigma against women in the rock world. Bassist ENRIQUE approached the band, saying "If you're in trouble, how about I join?" Upon joining the Barbee Boys, he became the youngest member of the band.

In November 1983, the band won the CBS/Sony SD Audition Grand Prix.

On September 21, 1984, they debuted their first major single, Kurayami de DANCE.

On April 1, 1987, their single Megitsune on the Run was released, and was used in advertisements for Mitsuya Cider.

On July 2, 1988, KONTA starred in his first feature-length film, Futari Bocchi, with the soundtrack being performed by RADIO-K and the Barbee Boys.

On January 1, 1989, the band released the single Me wo Tojiru Oide Yo. The song and the band were featured in advertisements for Shiseido's TREND・Y brand hair styling products. It reached No. 8 on the Oricon Weekly Singles Ranking and sold 168,000 copies.

On January 24, 1992, the Barbee Boys held a final live concert in Shibuya Public Hall, and formally disbanded. It was almost 10 years since their formation.

=== 2003–present ===
In February 2003, the Barbee Boys had a limited reunion concert at Epic Records Japan's 25th anniversary event, LIVE EPIC 25. At the request of the band, footage of their performance from the event was not released until 2009, with the release of Kuradashi ・ Hachi Taizen - BARBEE BOYS LIVE STAGE ANTHOLOGY. The event was also not shown on NHK's live broadcast of the event, or on the event's DVD.

On April 21, 2008, the band reunited for one night at the SMAP×SMAP Meikyoku Kayou Matsuri, broadcast on Kansai TV and Fuji TV. They performed Onnagitsune on the Run. On August 15, they performed at the Rising Sun Rock Festival 2008, and on August 23, at Sound Marina 2008. As a result, the band made regular appearances at these festivals in following years.

From February 13, 2009, in celebration of their 25th anniversary, the Barbee Boys held Re:BARBEE BOYS, a special tour at four Zepp music halls across Japan. During the tour, they performed new songs. From February 26, 2010, they held Bcc: from BARBEE BOYS AD2010, another tour. On the final day, March 7, they performed at the Nippon Budokan for the first time in 21 years.

On February 25, 2015, they released a remastered edition of their first album, REAL BAND -1st Option 30th Anniversary Edition-. There were no live shows, but Imamichi and Kyoko gave interviews using the band name Barbee Boys.

On October 25, 2018, the band made a one-night return on the NHK Broadcast Satellite Premium The Covers'Fes.2018, their first live show in eight years, performing Me wo Tojiru Oide Yo and Onnagitsune on the Run. According to Imamichi, every member had a free schedule that day, making a live show feasible. On November 21, BARBEE BOYS IN TOKYO DOME 1988.08.22 was released, containing the recording of their 1988 Tokyo Dome concert 30 years prior.

Going into 2019, the Barbee Boys officially resumed full-fledged activities. On September 8, they announced their first album in 29 years, PlanBee, to be released on December 18. On November 8, a limited edition advance single from PlanBee titled Muteki no Valerie was released.

== Discography ==
=== Studio albums ===
	Title	Release date	Format	Catalog number
1st	1st OPTION	February 25, 1985	LP	28・3H-156
1st	1st OPTION	February 25, 1985	Compact Cassette	28・6H-129
2nd	Freebee	November 1, 1985	LP	28・3H-181
2nd	Freebee	November 1, 1985	Compact Cassette	28・6H-146
2nd	Freebee	November 1, 1985	CD	32・8H-48
3rd	3rd BREAK	October 1, 1986	LP	28・3H-245
3rd	3rd BREAK	October 1, 1986	Compact Cassette	28・6H-190
3rd	3rd BREAK	October 1, 1986	CD	32・8H-80
4th	LISTEN! BARBEE BOYS 4	September 9, 1987	LP	28・3H-298
4th	LISTEN! BARBEE BOYS 4	September 9, 1987	Compact Cassette	28・6H-250
4th	LISTEN! BARBEE BOYS 4	September 9, 1987	CD	32・8H-134
5th	√5 Root Five	February 1, 1989	LP	28・3H-5066
5th	√5 Root Five	February 1, 1989	Compact Cassette	28・6H-5066
5th	√5 Root Five	February 1, 1989	CD	32・8H-5066
6th	eeney meeney barbee moe	April 13, 1990	CD	ESCB-1042
6th	eeney meeney barbee moe	April 13, 1990	Compact Cassette	ESTB-1042
7th	PlanBee	December 18, 2019	CD	BB-21000001
7th	PlayBee	January 29, 2020	EP	HRLP-190
7th	MasterBee	February 8, 2020	Digital download	—

=== Singles ===
	Title	Release date	Format	Catalog number	Album
1st	暗闇でDANCE Kurayami de DANCE	September 21, 1984	7-inch single	07・5H-213	1st OPTION
2nd	もォ やだ! Mō Yada!	February 1, 1985	7-inch single	07・5H-228	1st OPTION
3rd	でも!?しょうがない Demo!? Shouganai	June 21, 1985	7-inch single	07・5H-249	Freebee
4th	チャンス到来 Chance Tourai	October 2, 1985	7-inch single	07・5H-264	Freebee
5th	負けるもんか Makerumonka	April 2, 1986	12-inch single	12・3H-215	Freebee
6th	なんだったんだ?7DAYS Nandattanda?7DAYS	October 1, 1986	7-inch single	07・5H-315	3rd BREAK
7th	女ぎつねon the Run Onnagitsune on the Run	April 1, 1987	7-inch single	07・5H-344	LISTEN! BARBEE BOYS 4
8th	泣いたままでlisten to me Naitamamade listen to me	August 26, 1987	7-inch single	07・5H-364	LISTEN! BARBEE BOYS 4
9th	ごめんなさい Gomennasai	December 2, 1987	7-inch single	07・5H-395	LISTEN! BARBEE BOYS 4
10th	使い放題tenderness Tsukai Houdai tenderness	June 22, 1988	7-inch single	07・5H-3032	JUST TWO OF US
10th	使い放題tenderness Tsukai Houdai tenderness	June 22, 1988	Compact Cassette	10・6H-3032	JUST TWO OF US
10th	使い放題tenderness Tsukai Houdai tenderness	June 22, 1988	Mini CD single	10・8H-3032	JUST TWO OF US
11th	目を閉じておいでよ Me wo Tojite Oide Yo	January 1, 1989	7-inch single	07・5H-3081	√5
11th	目を閉じておいでよ Me wo Tojite Oide Yo	January 1, 1989	Compact Cassette	10・6H-3081	√5
11th	目を閉じておいでよ Me wo Tojite Oide Yo	January 1, 1989	Mini CD single	10・8H-3081	√5
12th	chibi	June 1, 1989	7-inch single	07・5H-3097	√5
12th	chibi	June 1, 1989	Compact Cassette	10・6H-3097	√5
12th	chibi	June 1, 1989	Mini CD single	10・8H-3097	√5
13th	三日月の憂鬱 Mikadzuki no Yuuutsu	November 1, 1989	Compact Cassette	ESSB-3011	eeney meeney barbee moe
13th	三日月の憂鬱 Mikadzuki no Yuuutsu	November 1, 1989	Mini CD single	ESDB-3011	eeney meeney barbee moe
14th	勇み足サミー Isamiashi Sammy	March 1, 1990	Mini CD single	ESDB-3074	eeney meeney barbee moe
15th	ノーマジーン〜norma jean＜reprise＞	July 21, 1990	Mini CD single	ESDB-3100	eeney meeney barbee moe
16th	あいまいtension Aimai tension	October 10, 1990	Mini CD single	ESDB-3146	eeney meeney barbee moe
Limited Release	無敵のヴァレリー Muteki no Valerie	November 8, 2019	Digital download	—	PlanBee
