= Kokka =

Japanese arts magazine

- Discipline: Oriental art
- Language: Japanese

Publication details
- History: 1889 to present
- Publisher: Kokkasha (Japan)

Standard abbreviations
- ISO 4: Kokka

Indexing
- ISSN: 0023-2785

Kokka (國華; lit. 'Flower of the Nation') is a Japanese periodical of East Asian art, first issued in October 1889. Kokka was established by Okakura Tenshin, journalist Takahashi Kenzō (高橋健三), and a patron of the arts who sought to challenge the primacy of Western art in Meiji Japan. Kokka is published in Japanese, with contents and some summaries in English. In 1905 an English-language edition was also published. A pioneer of collotype printing in Japan, the publication is renowned for the quality of its images.

== See also ==
- Cultural Properties of Japan
- Datsu-A Ron
