= Tomotaka Imamichi =

Japanese music producer, guitarist and songwriter (born 1959)

- Born: Tomotaka Imamichi (イマミチ・トモタカ, Imamichi Tomotaka; kanji: 今道友隆, aka Imasa); October 12, 1959 (age 66)
- Origin: Tokyo, Japan
- Genres: Rock
- Occupations: Guitarist, songwriter, music producer
- Instrument: guitar
- Years active: 1975–present

Tomotaka Imamichi (イマミチ・トモタカ, Imamichi Tomotaka; kanji: 今道友隆, aka Imasa), (born October 12, 1959) is a Japanese music producer, guitarist and songwriter from Tokyo, Japan. He first came to prominence in the Japanese music circuit in 1984 as the guitarist and primary songwriter for the rock band Barbee Boys, although it is reported that he has been writing music himself since at least 1975 after being highly influenced by Toshikatsu Utsumi from the legendary folk band Carol.

== Musical career ==
=== 1980s ===
In 1984, Imamichi debuted as the leader and guitarist of the Japanese new wave band Barbee Boys, which he had formed in 1982. As the main songwriter, he composed most songs for the band, including hit singles such as "Me wo Tojite Oide yo" (lit. "Close your eyes and come here"), "Makeru Mon ka" (lit. "I Won't Give in"), and "Megitsune ON THE RUN" (lit. "Vixen On the Run").

In 1985, Imamichi (under the alias "Chakku Mūton," or "Chuck Mouton") composed "Ura Niwa no Gare-ji de Dakishimete" (lit. "Embrace Me in the Backyard Barage") for Seiko Matsuda's album entitled Strawberry Time.

=== 1990s to present ===
After the breakup of Barbee Boys, Imamichi began his solo career under the name "Love Dynamights".

In December 1990, he performed at Yoko Ono's two-day concert event, Greening of the World (GOW) at Tokyo Dome. In celebration of what would have been John Lennon's 50th birthday, the event was the first large-scale charity event held in Japan and sought to promote environmental awareness through music, featuring various top international artists (including Miles Davis, Natalie Cole, Lenny Kravitz, and Hall & Oates) along with a number of famous Japanese artists such as Kiyoshiro Imawano, Haruomi Hosono and Yukihiro Takahashi, for a total of 29 performances. At the event, Imamichi performed a guitar solo rendition of "Come Together" before the audience of 50,000. The event was later broadcast on the Japanese pay-per-view station WOWOW.

Imamichi had translated the lyrics of "Come Together" for the booklet in the Japanese version of the 1967–1970 (The Blue Album). Later, Imamichi and Konta recorded an electronical version of the song for the Love Dynamights STEREO SOLID SONIC Vol. 2 album. (See discography below.)

From 1994 Imamichi worked with Kei-Tee and Kamiryou Wataru (from the band Grass Valley) in "Kei-Tee+LOVE DYNAMIGHTS".

In 2004, he released his first work under his true name.

== Personal life ==
Tomotaka Imamichi was born in Tokyo to father Tomonobu Imamichi, a Japanese philosopher and artist who has taught as a professor emeritus at the University of Tokyo and St. Thomas University, Japan (formerly known as Eichi University). His mother had been a soprano singer and taught at a music university, but his parents divorced while he was still a young child. Consequently, Imamichi was raised by his father.

Imamichi (who often goes by the nickname Imasa) married the head stylist for the Barbee Boys on March 3, 1991 at precisely 3:33 a.m. (The year 1991 corresponds to the Japanese calendar scheme as Heisei 3, thus making his marriage on 3/3/3 at 3:33.) The couple had a child, but later divorced.

In 2001, Imamichi remarried when he entered a civil marriage with former musical collaborator, Kei-Tee, after a period of cohabitation. The two did not have children and divorced in January 2007, at least in part due to a poor relationship between Imamichi and Kei-Tee's father, Japanese publisher and film producer, Haruki Kadokawa.

== Career as a guitarist ==
Imamichi is noted for his spatial-sounding backup guitar work, which closely resembles Andy Summers.

Although there were five members in Barbee Boys, when you exclude the saxophonist, Konta, the band basically consisted of only three main instruments: drums, bass and guitar. Nevertheless, Imamichi's unique arpeggio technique, coupled with the clear sound he produced using a compressor and spatial effects pedals (i.e., echo and delay), produced the distinct depth of sound that became a hallmark of the band's performance. Superficially, there does not seem to be much technique involved with Imamichi's style, but producing such a sound is actually quite difficult.

== Backup and collaboration work ==
Since his time with Barbee Boys, Imamichi has composed songs with artists such as Kaori Kawamura, and has recorded as a guitarist with Psy-S, Misato Watanabe, Motoharu Sano, and Yōsui Inoue, among others.

=== As recording guitarist (including) ===
- Yōsui Inoue
- Kaori Kawamura
- Kenji Sawada
- Ringo Shiina
- Kazuo Zaitsu
- Kazuyuki Sekiguchi
- Akina Nakamori
- Yukari Morikawa
- Chris Mosdell

=== As a live guitarist (including) ===
- Kumiko Yamashita
- Gurf Morlix

=== As a songwriter (including) ===
- Kyōko Koizumi
- Kenji Sawada
- Seiko Matsuda
- Barbee Boys

== Discography (solo) ==
=== Albums ===
- STEREO SOLID SONIC （as Love Dynamights、released Dec. 22, 1993）
- STEREO SOLID SONIC Vol.2 ~The Ultra Sound Track （as Love Dynamights、released Dec. 19, 1994）
- 愛は極嬢 （as Kei-Tee+LOVE DYNAMIGHTS、released Nov. 23, 1994）
- PINK&BLUE （as Kei-Teeといまみちともたかとlove LOVE DYNAMIGHTS、released 1996）
- SLOW RIDE （as Tomotaka Imamichi、released Apr. 7, 2004）

=== Singles ===
- WILDルビィ （as Kei-Tee+LOVE DYNAMIGHTS、released Oct. 21, 1994）

== TV appearances ==
- Morita Kazuyoshi's Hour, Waratte Iitomo: "Telephone Shocking" (Aug. 2, 1990)

Imamichi's physical appearance is marked by his large lower jaw, and during the interview he brought up the subject saying that, "From a medical point of view, such a bone structure is quite rare". He jokingly commented, "I love shishamo, and eating shishamo all day your bones will grow all too well and you end up with a chin like this".
