= Rokkakudō (Kitaibaraki) =

Building in Kitaibaraki, Japan

Coordinates: 36°50′00″N 140°48′12″E

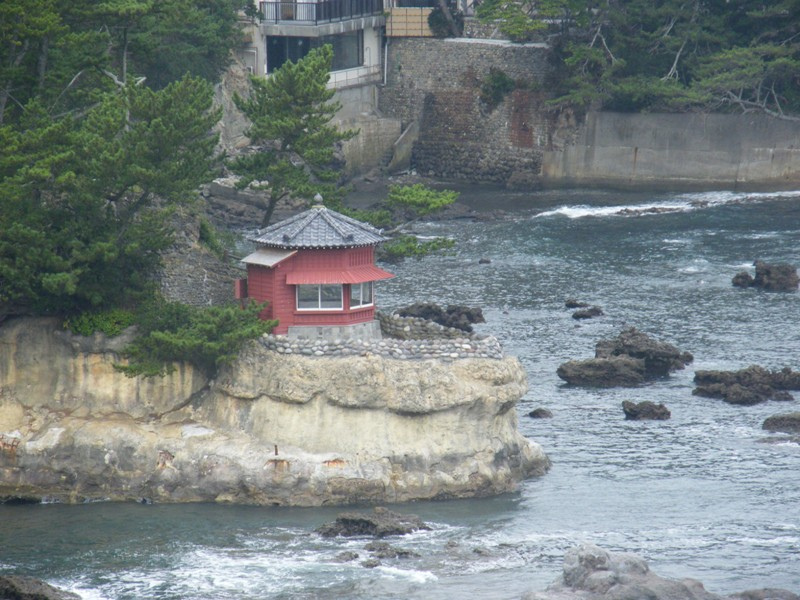
Rokkaku-dō in 2008

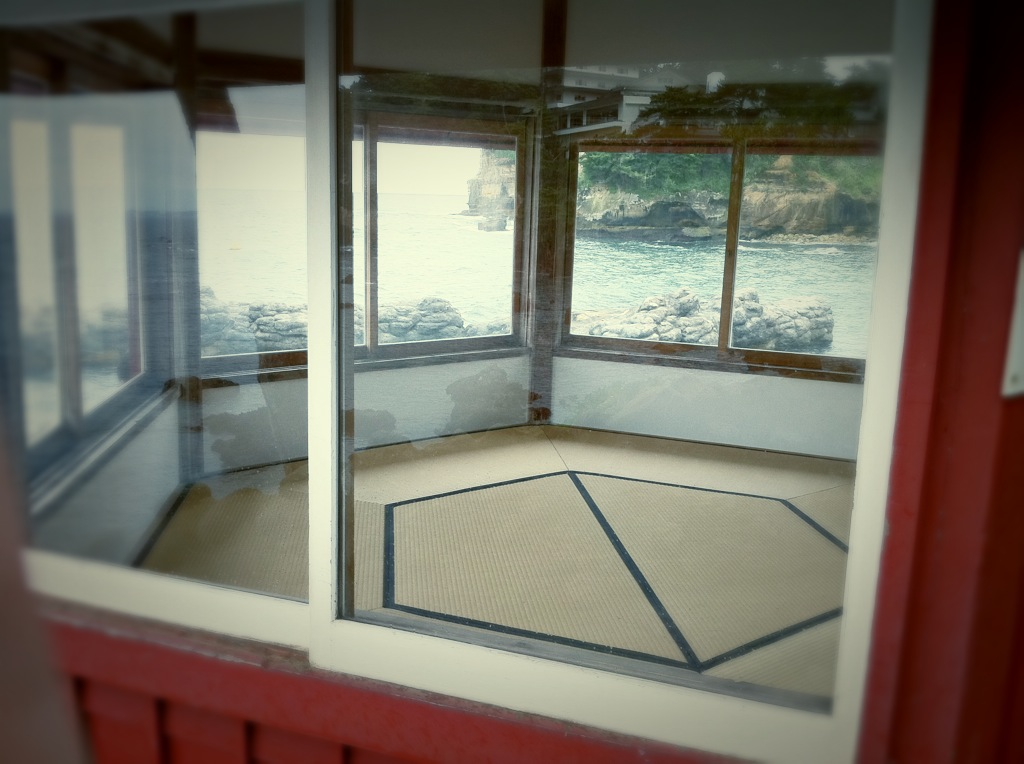
Interior of the Rokkaku-dō; note the shape and arrangement of the tatami

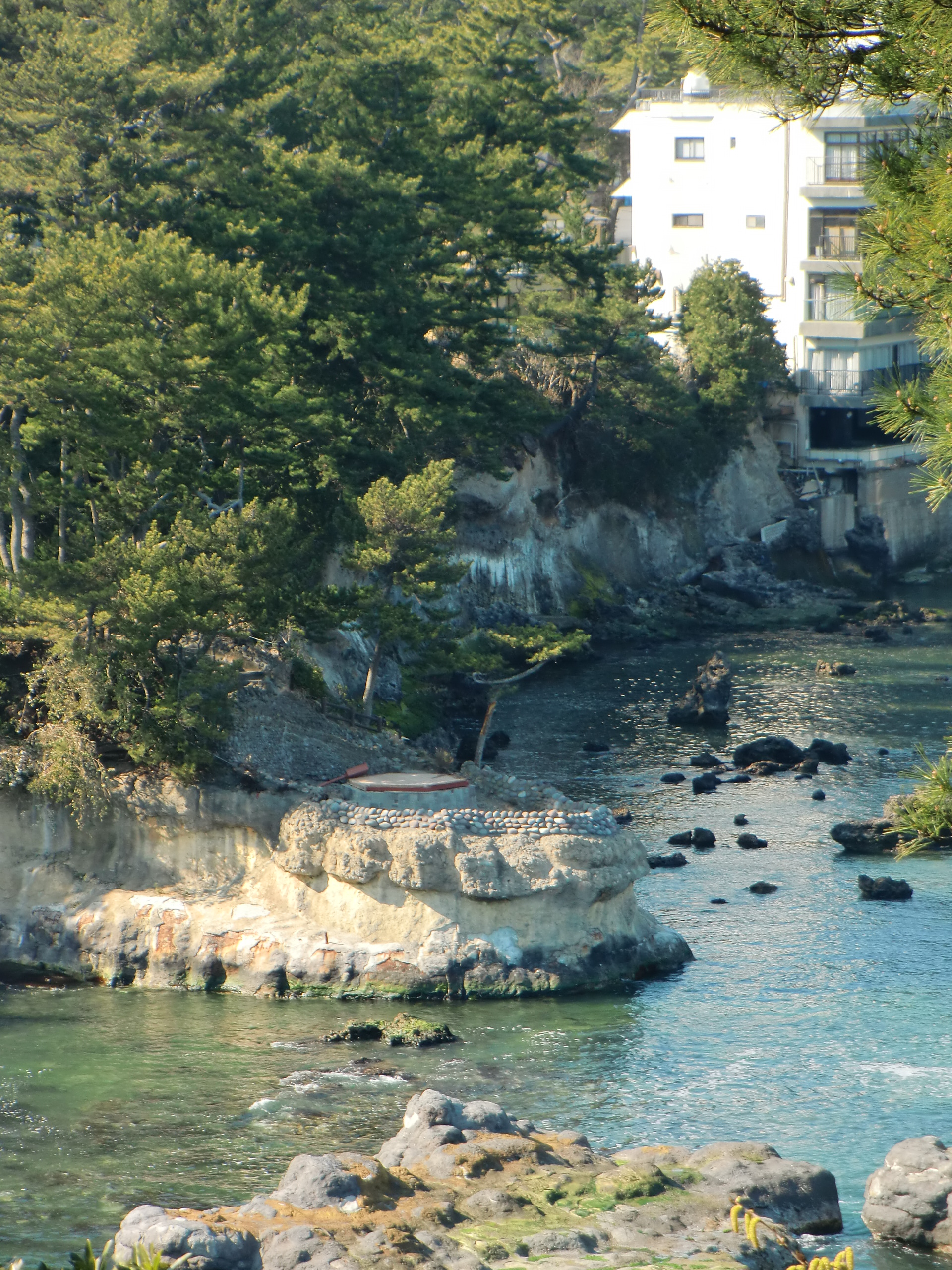
Site of Rokkaku-dō after the 2011 Tōhoku earthquake and tsunami

Rokkakudō (六角堂), was a hexagonal wooden retreat overlooking the sea along the Izura coast in Kitaibaraki, Ibaraki Prefecture, Japan. Dating to 1905, it was part of the Izura Institute of Arts & Culture, Ibaraki University. Constructed in the sukiya-zukuri style, single-storey, with a tiled roof, an area of nine square metres, and painted red, it was designed by scholar and critic Okakura Tenshin who spent time there with painter Yokoyama Taikan. In 2003 it was added to the Tangible Cultural Properties Register. On 11 March 2011 it was swept off to sea in the tsunami. It was rebuilt and opened to the public in April 2012.

== See also ==
- Tenshin Memorial Museum of Art, Ibaraki
- Nihon Bijutsuin
- Registered Cultural Properties
- Kanrantei
- Japanese aesthetics
