= Tomonobu Imamichi =

Japanese philosopher

- Born: November 19, 1922; Tokyo
- Died: October 13, 2012 (aged 89)
- Education: University of Tokyo
- Occupation: Philosopher
- Children: Tomotaka Imamichi, Nobuko Kawaguchi, Yukiko Imamichi, Tomoaki Imamichi

Tomonobu Imamichi (今道 友信, Imamichi Tomonobu; November 19, 1922 – October 13, 2012) was a Japanese philosopher who studied Chinese philosophy.

== Life ==
Imamichi taught in Europe (Paris and Germany) as well as in Japan (he was also emeritus professor of the University of Palermo). Beginning in 1979 he was the president of the Centre International pour l'Étude Comparée de Philosophie et d'Esthétique and after 1997 of the International Institute of Philosophy. In 1976 he founded the journal Aesthetics.

He translated Aristotle's Poetics into Japanese (in 1972) and has written numerous books in Japanese. Imamichi was a supporter of communication between cultures. He characterizes Western philosophy as an attempt to achieve a God's eye view (das in-dem-Gott-sein; to be in the being of God) and Eastern philosophy as an attempt to be in the world (das in-der-Welt-sein). Imamichi sees in both stances two incomplete and complementary humanisms, and observes that since the publication of The Book of Tea, some Western philosophers have adopted a more Eastern stance while other Eastern philosophers have attempted to reach the Absolute or the Eternal.

Tomonobu Imamichi was the father of guitarist and songwriter Tomotaka Imamichi, pianist Nobuko Kawaguchi, biologist Yukiko Imamichi and psychologist Tomoaki Imamichi.

== Bibliography ==
- In Search of Wisdom. One Philosopher's Journey, Tokyo, International House of Japan, 2004
- 'Restrospectiva et Prospectiva Eco-ethics' in Acta Institutionis Philosophiae et Aestheticae, 2004, 22:1-10 (an article written in English, Latin, German, French, Chinese, etc.)
- Betrachtungen über das Eine, Institute of Aesthetics of Tokyo, 1968
- Aspects of Beautiful and Art, 1968
- Self-Development of the Identity, 1970
- The Localisation and the orientation of Interpretation, 1972
- Essay on Beauty, 1973
- Studia Comparata de Esthetica, 1976
- Aristotle, 1980
- Aesthetics in the Orient, 1980
- Philosophy in the East and in the West, 1981
- Contemporary Philosophy, 1984
- The History of the Western Philosophy, 1986
- Eco-Ethica, 1990
- Le texte comme distance de la Divinité, in Archivio di filosofia anno LX, 1992, 1–3
- Introduzione alla Filosofia Naturale, 1993.
