= Wada Eisaku =

Japanese painter

- 和田英作
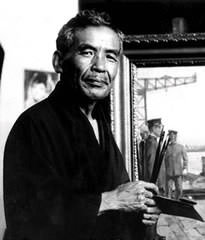
- Born: December 23, 1874; Tarumizu, Kagoshima, Empire of Japan
- Died: January 3, 1959 (aged 84); Shimizu, Shizuoka Prefecture, Japan
- Known for: Painter
- Movement: Yōga

Wada Eisaku (和田英作; December 23, 1874 – January 3, 1959) was a Japanese painter and luminary of the yōga (or Western-style) scene in the late Meiji, Taishō, and Shōwa eras. He was a member of the Japan Art Academy, an Imperial Household Artist, a recipient of the Order of the Sacred Treasure and Order of Culture, an Officier in the Légion d'honneur, and a Person of Cultural Merit.

== Biography ==
Born in what is now the city of Tarumizu, Kagoshima Prefecture, Japan, in 1874, little Eisaku moved to Azabu in Tokyo with his family at the age of four or five when his father Wada Shūhō, a pastor, was appointed as an instructor in English at the Naval Academy. In 1887 the young Wada entered the Protestant Meiji Gakuin; among his classmates was fellow yōga painter Miyake Kokki, while author Tōson Shimazaki was in one of the years above. After learning the rudiments of Western-style painting from Uesugi Kumatsu, with his introduction, dropping out of Meiji Gakuin in 1891, he studied alongside Miyake and Nakazawa Hiromitsu under Soyama Sachihiko at his Daikōkan (大幸館) painting school. After his death in 1892, Wada studied alongside Miyake at Harada Naojirō's Shōbikan (鍾美館); the same year his work featured at the 4th Meiji Bijutsu-kai Exhibition, and again at the 5th in 1893. In 1893 he also studied Nihonga, under Kubota Beisen. After Harada's painting school closed in 1894, Wada studied under Kuroda Seiki and Kume Keiichirō, on their return from Paris, at their newly established Tenshin Dōjō (天真道場), where he became versed in pleinairism. Kuroda was not alone in being struck by his student's precocious abilities: at the following year's Fourth National Industrial Exhibition, his Early Summer Beside the Sea was awarded a "Virtuosity Prize" (similarly honoured were Kuroda (for his scandalizing Morning Toilette), Kume, and Asai Chū).

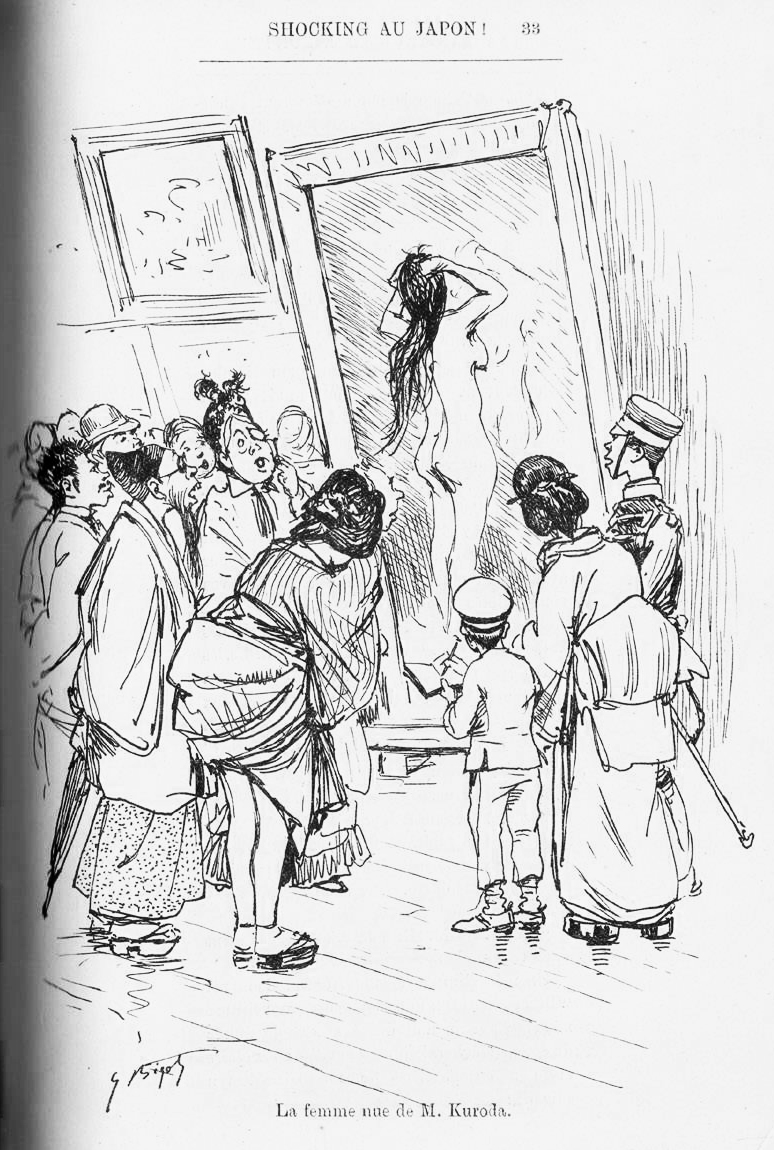
The public display of a western-style painting of a nude, Morning Toilette (1893), by Kuroda Seiki at the Fourth National Industrial Exhibition in Kyōto in 1895 caused a scandal, caricatured here by Bigot in La femme nue

In 1896 Wada was involved, along with Kuroda and Kume, in the establishment of the Hakuba-kai or "White Horse Society", submitting nineteen pieces for the 1st Exhibition that year; he would continue to submit paintings for their exhibitions until the 12th in 1909, even during the time he was in Europe. Also in 1896, when Kuroda became Professor in the newly formed Department of Western-Style Painting (yōga) at the Tokyo Academy of Fine Arts, Wada, Fujishima Takeji, and Okada Saburōsuke were appointed Assistant Professors; however, in 1897 he resigned from his post, enrolling as a student in the same department, with special dispensation to enter as a fourth-year student, whence he then became the first to graduate, his graduation piece being his 1897 Evening at the Ferry Crossing. He spent half of 1898 guiding Adolf Fischer (de), future founder of the Museum of East Asian Art (Cologne), around various locales, including the Kinai and Hokuriku regions and Kyūshū. In 1899 Wada took up Fischer's invitation to assist with the cataloguing of his burgeoning collection of Japanese art, and travelled to Berlin; this was the time of the Berlin Secession. In March 1900 he moved to Paris, where he saw his Evening at the Ferry Crossing at the Grand Palais during the Exposition Universelle (where it received an Honourable Mention). There he studied, like Kuroda, Kume, and Okada, under Raphaël Collin at the Académie Colarossi, sponsored by the Monbusho. From Autumn 1901 to Spring the following year, Wada stayed in Grez-sur-Loing with Asai Chū, where they painted and penned their Grez Diaries (愚劣日記). In 1902 he learned decorative arts from Eugène Grasset who is a pioneer of Art Nouveau. His Thoughts of Home (Portrait of a Japanese Lady) appeared at the 1902 Salon organized by the Société des Artistes Français, while he sent Kodama back home for the Fifth National Industrial Exhibition, in 1903, where again he was awarded a runners-up prize. When he stayed in Paris, he held a gathering of haiku poets with Beisai Kubota.

Returning to Japan, via Italy, also in 1903 he was appointed professor at his alma mater. In 1904 he exhibited a landscape at the St. Louis World's Fair. In 1907 he was appointed one of the judges at the Tokyo Industrial Exhibition, where he was awarded a First Prize for his Setting Sun, and also of the inaugural Bunten exhibition (he would continue to be a member of the adjudicating committee until the 12th and final Bunten exhibition in 1918). Also in 1907, he married Takahashi Shigeko (高橋滋子). In 1911 he painted the ceiling of the Imperial Theatre as well as murals for its dining room. In 1914 he was appointed one of the judges at the Tokyo Taishō Exhibition, exhibited at the Kōfū-kai Exhibition and painted murals for the Akasaka Detached Palace and Tokyo Station. In 1919 he became a member of the Imperial Fine Arts Academy. In 1920 he travelled again to Europe, returning in 1921 after his involvement in the display of Japanese works in an exhibition organized by the French government. In 1922 he was awarded the Order of the Sacred Treasure, 4th Class, and in 1923 membership in the Légion d'honneur with the rank of Officier. Also in 1923 he was appointed one of the judges at the second Chōsen Art Exhibition ("Senten"). In 1925 he transferred his official place of residence from Kagoshima to Tokyo. In 1926 one of his paintings was included in the 1st Exhibition in Honour of Shōtoku Taishi, and in each of 1929, 1936, and 1941 he was the subject of one-man shows at the Nihonbashi Mitsukoshi. In 1932 he became President of the Tokyo Academy of Fine Arts (he retired in 1936, to become an emeritus professor). In 1932 he published a book "Sketch-books of Seiki Kuroda". In 1933 he became a member of the Historical Sites, Places of Scenic Beauty, and Natural Monuments Examining Committee. In 1934 he became an Imperial Household Artist. In 1936 he completed his Ceremony for the Promulgation of the Constitution for the Meiji Memorial Picture Gallery. In 1937 he became a member of the Imperial Art Academy. For three years from 1940 he was involved in the copying of the wall paintings of the Hōryū-ji kondō. In 1943 he was a recipient of the Order of Culture. In 1945 he evacuated to what is now Yamatokōriyama in Nara Prefecture, then to Chiryū in Aichi Prefecture. In 1951 he was recognized as a Person of Cultural Merit and moved to Shimizu in Shizuoka Prefecture, where he died in 1959, posthumously receiving the Order of the Sacred Treasure, 1st Class.

== Works ==
Representative works include his early Evening at the Ferry Crossing (1897), Thoughts of Home (1902), and Kodama (1902); his mid-life series of portraits; and his late Ue-no-Midō (1945) and Summer Clouds (1950). He painted many still lifes with flowers, especially roses, and a number of views of Mount Fuji. His Evening at the Ferry Crossing depicts a family of farmers at the Yaguchi crossing (ja) of the Tama River, strikingly illuminated, according to art historian Harada Minoru (ja), through his "skillful manipulation of evening light". Kodama, inspired by the classical sculptures in the Louvre, and translated alternatively by Harada as Echo, is said to combine French Academism with German Expressionism as a "complete restatement and settlement" (総決算) of Wada's period of study abroad; in Harada's words, it "evokes a Romantic sensuousness through gentle shading of the figure and barely visible handling of the brush"; the painting has also been likened in effect to Munch's The Scream.

== Exhibitions ==
Dedicated retrospectives include the 2002 Wada Eisaku (和田英作展), at the Shizuoka Prefectural Museum of Art, 2007 Modern Western Master: Wada Eisaku (近代洋畫的巨匠 和田英作展), at the Kariya City Art Museum, 2014 Wada Eisaku (和田英作展), at the Kagoshima City Museum of Art, and 2016 Japanese Modern Yōga Master: Wada Eisaku (日本近代洋画の巨匠 和田英作展), again at the Kariya City Art Museum.

== Gallery ==
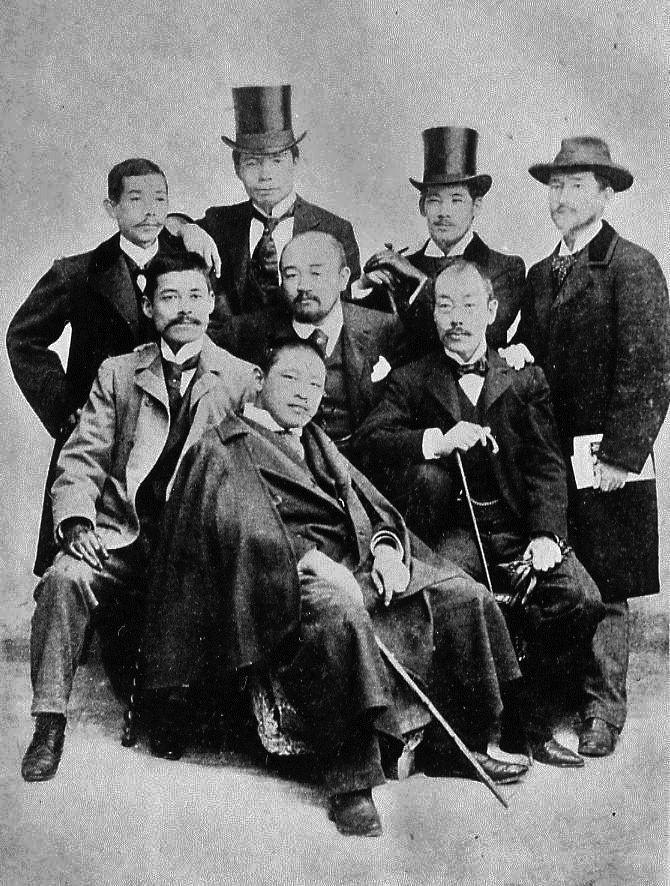
Hakuba-kai coterie in Paris in 1900; Wada Eisaku is the tall figure in the back row, with Okada Saburōsuke to his right; in the centre is Kuroda Seiki, with Kume Keiichirō to his left

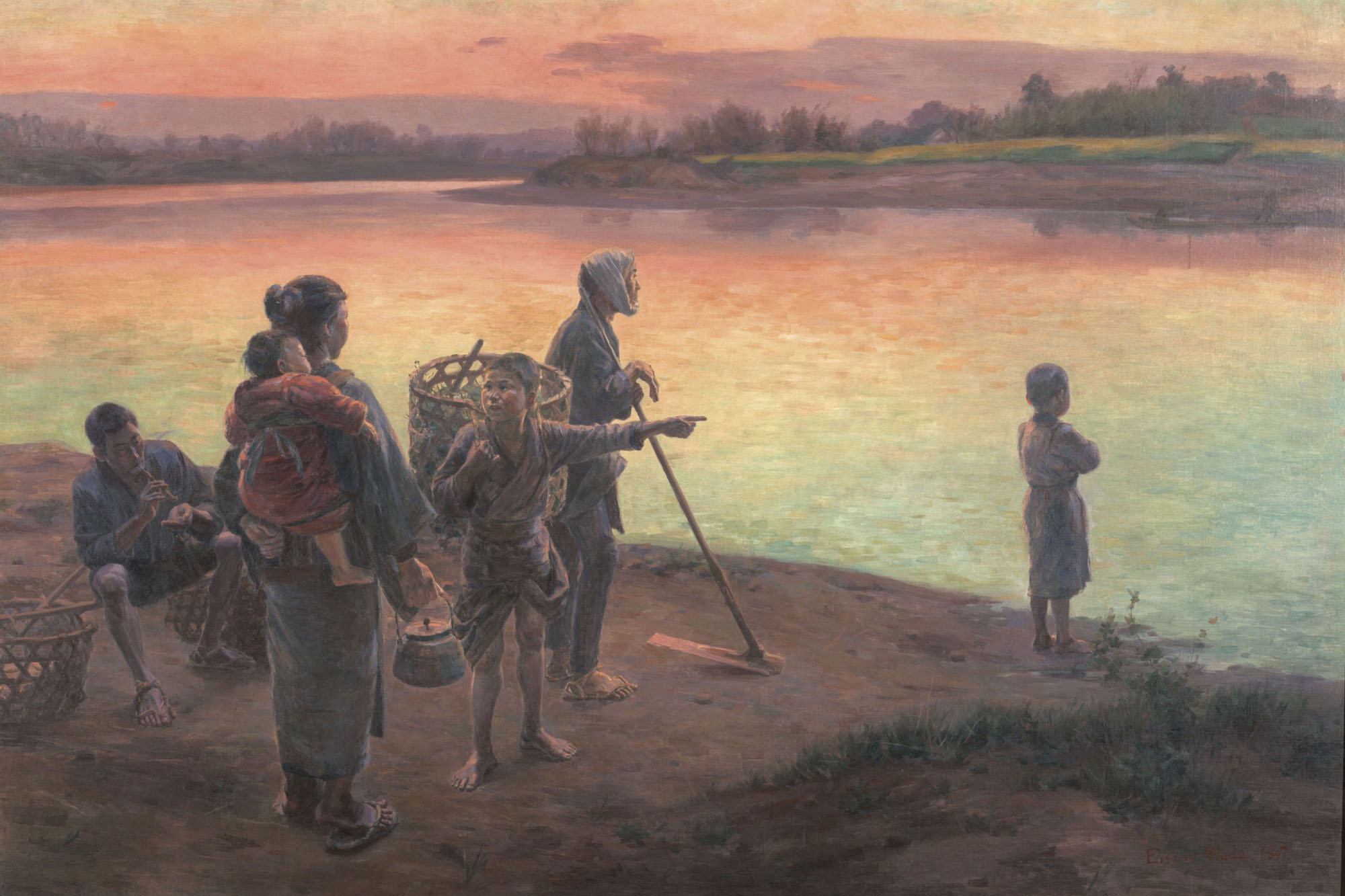
Evening at the Ferry Crossing (1897) (University Art Museum, Tokyo University of the Arts); exhibited at the 2nd Hakuba-kai Exhibition and the Exposition Universelle

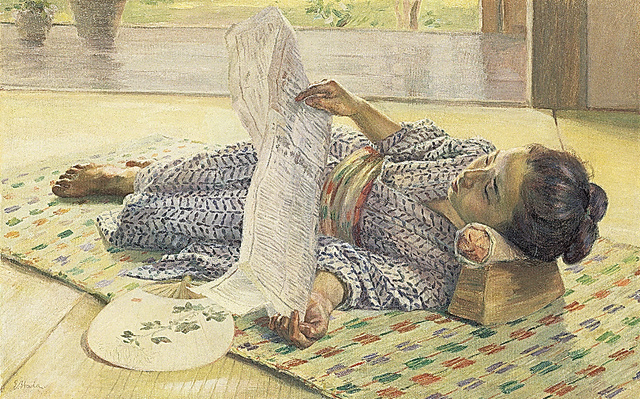
Girl Reading a Newspaper (1897) (University Art Museum, Tokyo University of the Arts); exhibited at the 7th Hakuba-kai Exhibition

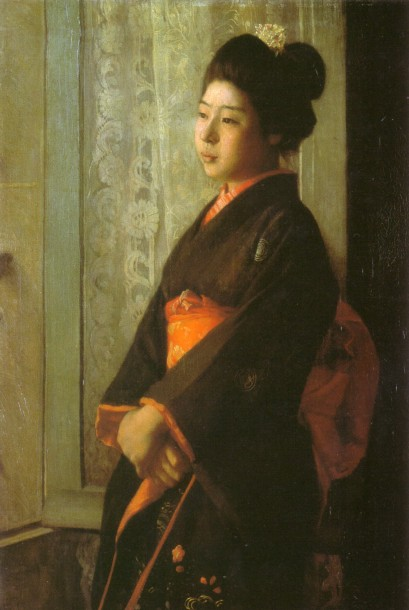
Thoughts of Home (Portrait of a Japanese Lady) (1902) (University Art Museum, Tokyo University of the Arts); exhibited at the Salon and the 8th Hakuba-kai Exhibition

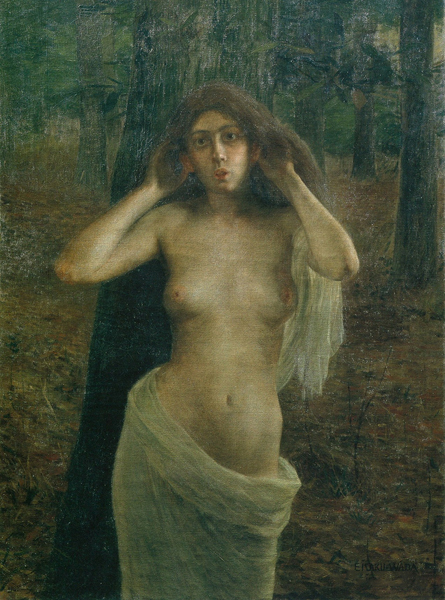
Kodama (1902) (Sen-oku Hakuko Kan); exhibited at the Fifth National Industrial Exhibition

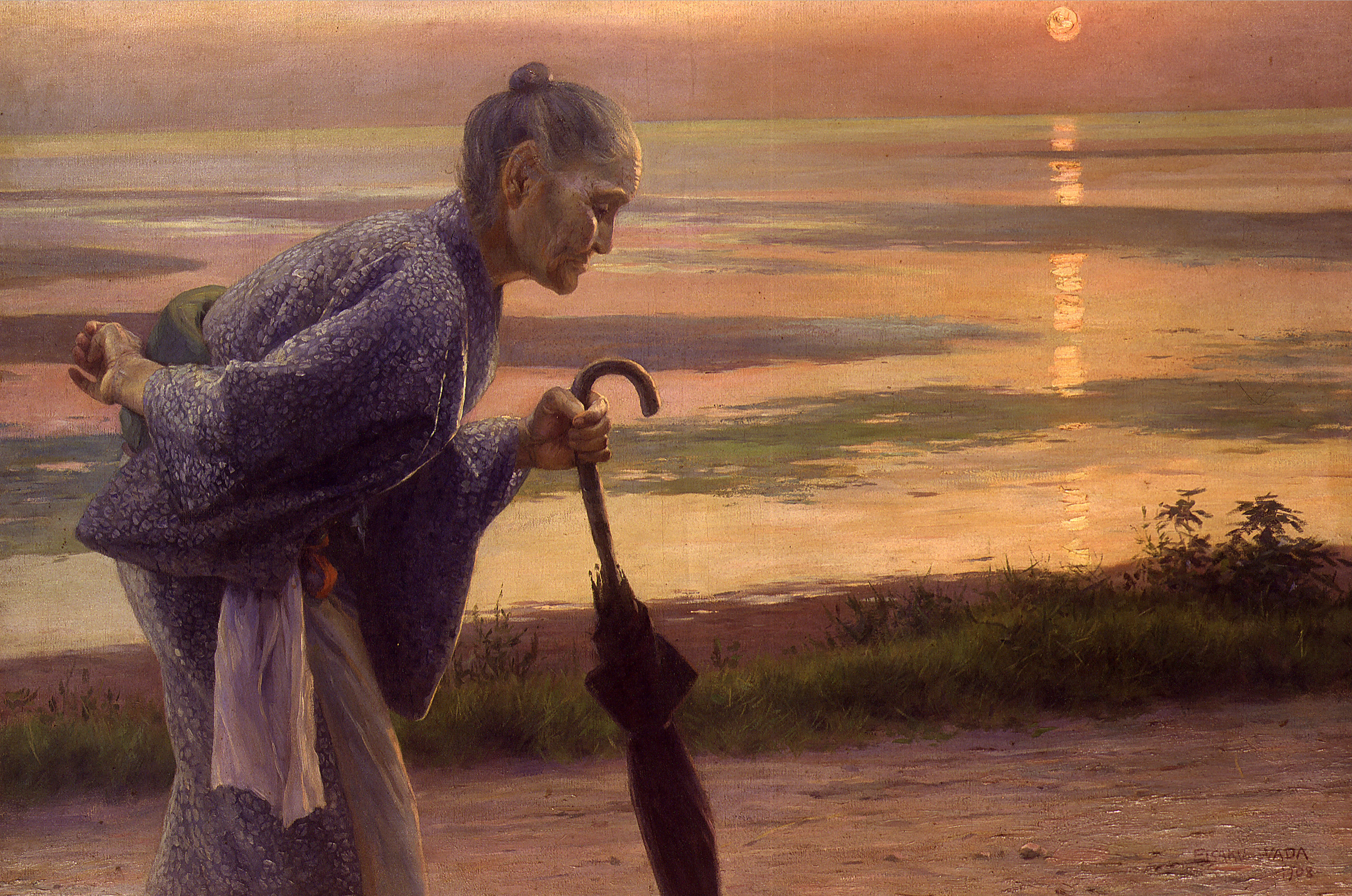
Old Woman (1908) (National Museum of Modern Art, Tokyo); exhibited at the 2nd Bunten

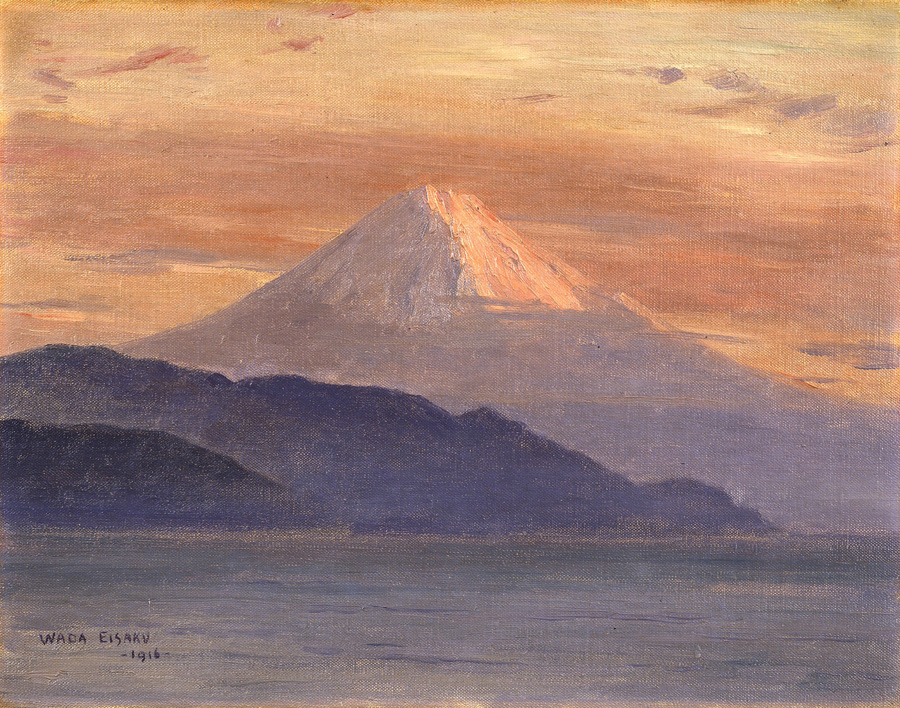
Red Fuji (1916) (Fujiyama Museum)

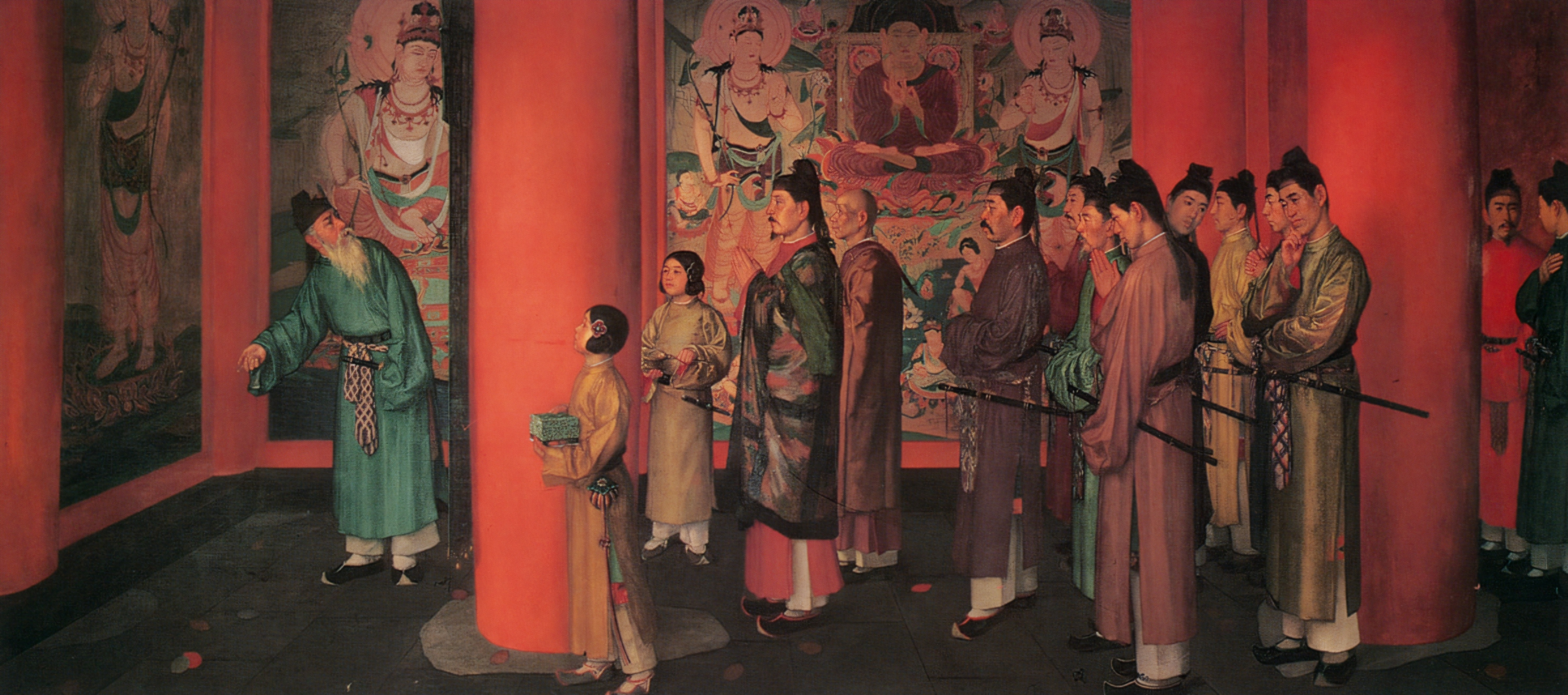
Celebration of the Completion of the Kondō (1918) (Hōryū-ji); exhibited at the 12th Bunten

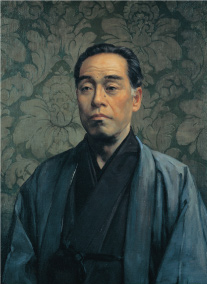
Portrait of Fukuzawa Yukichi (1920) (private collection)

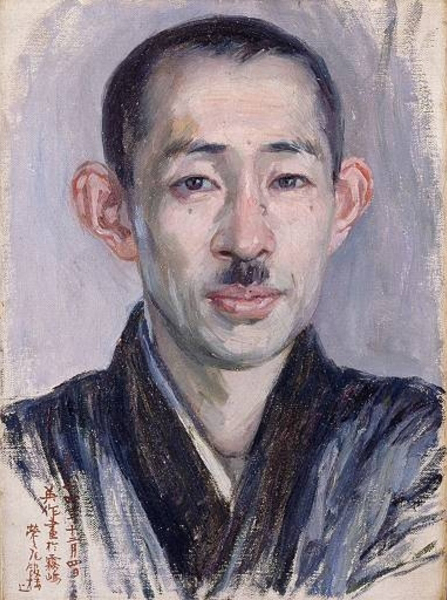
Portrait of Taniguchi Goji (ja) (1925) (Kagoshima City Museum of Art)

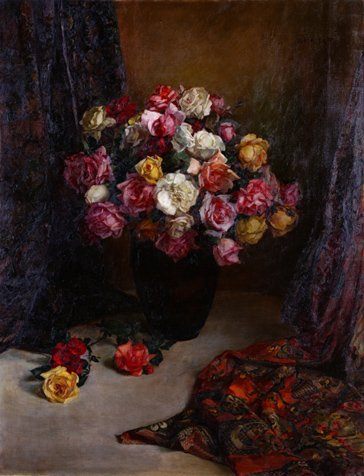
Roses (c.1926) (Pola Museum of Art)

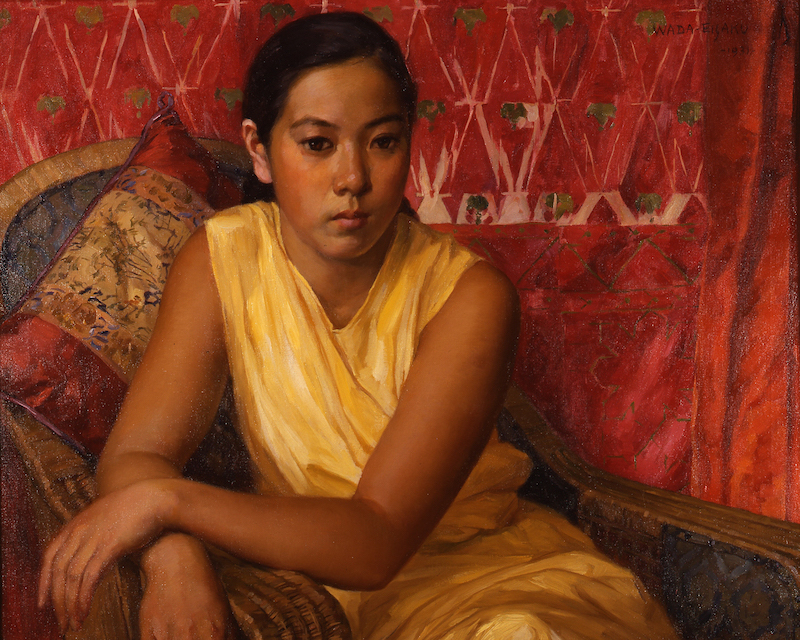
Girl in a Yellow Dress (1931) (Yamatane Museum); exhibited at the 12th Teiten

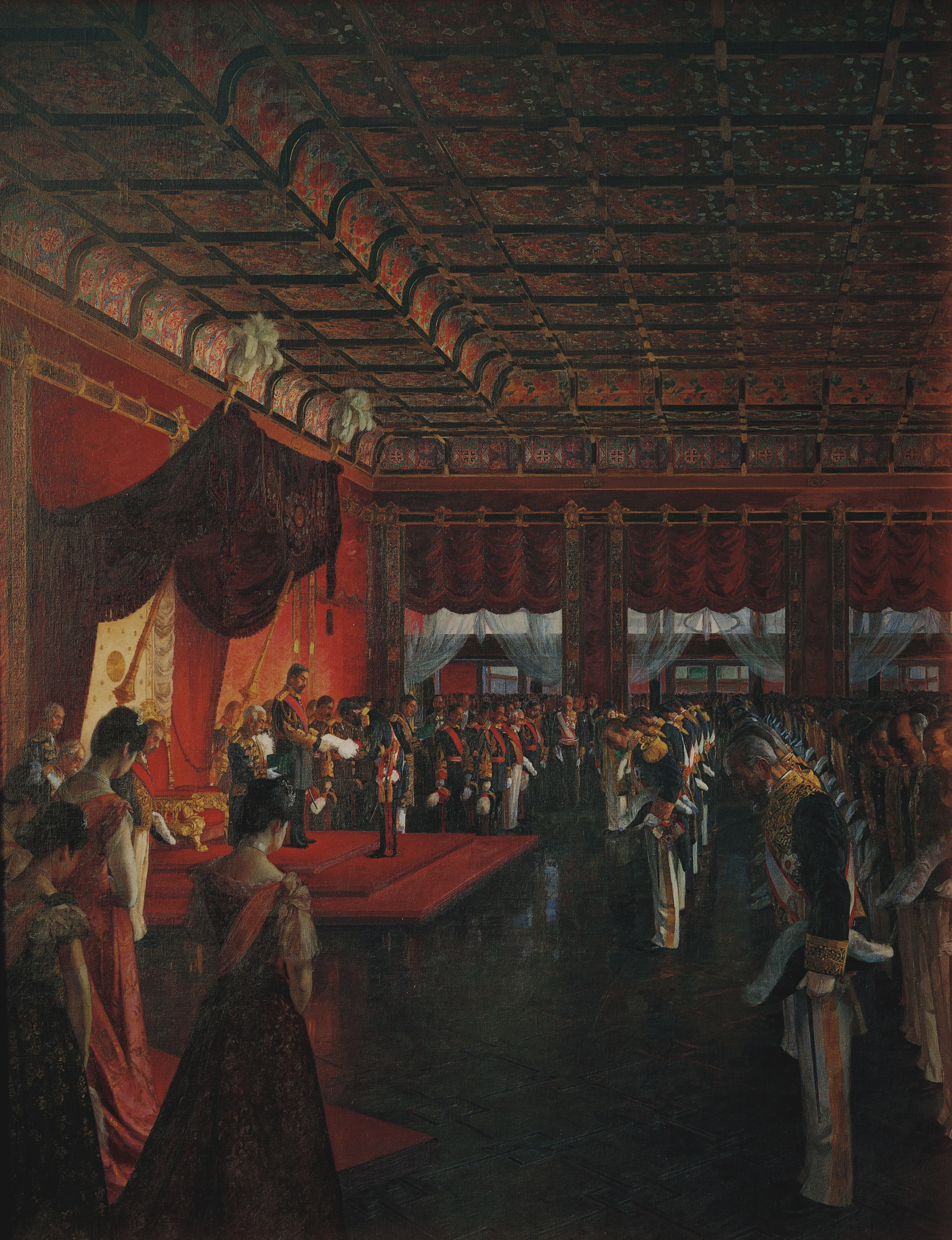
Ceremony for the Promulgation of the Constitution (1936) (Meiji Memorial Picture Gallery)

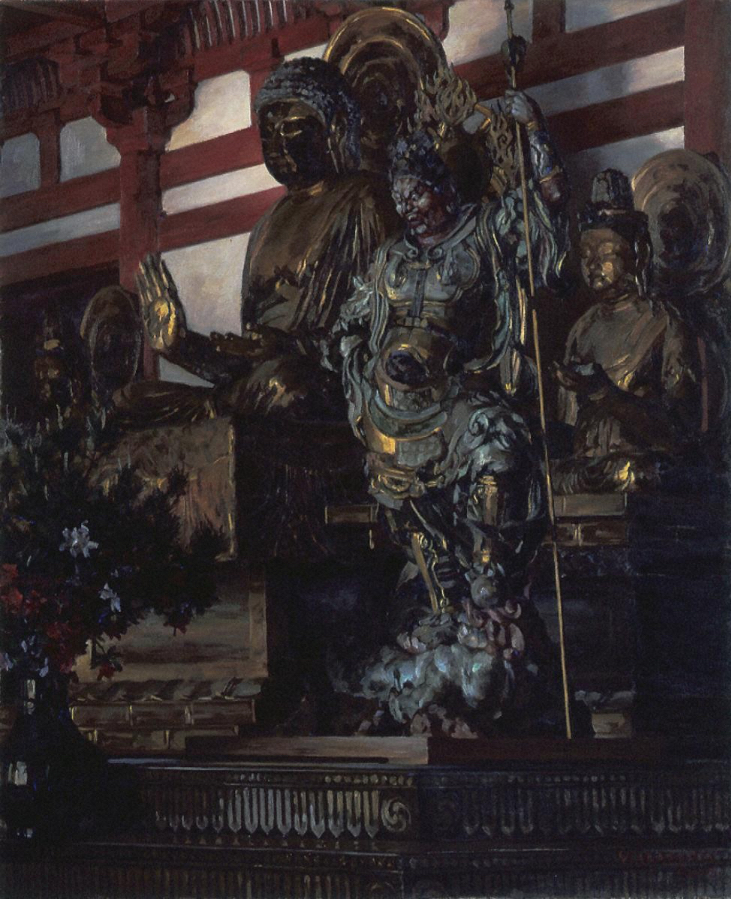
Ue-no-Midō (1945) (Kariya City Art Museum)

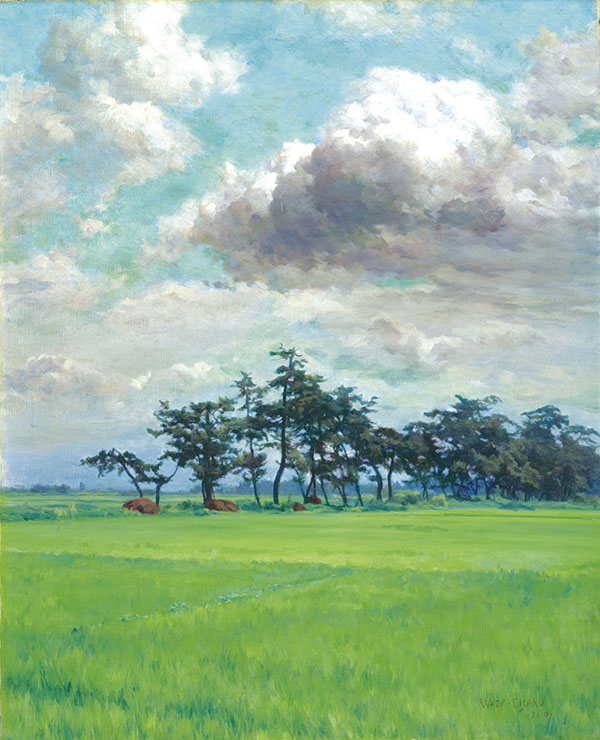
Summer Clouds (1950) (Toyota Collection); exhibited at the 6th Nitten

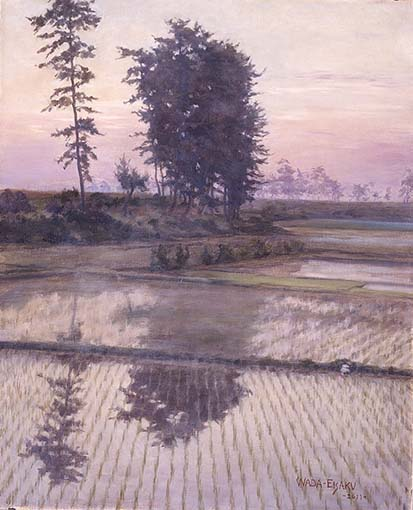
Landscape (1951) (Toyota Municipal Museum of Art)

== See also ==
- Japonisme
