= Tokyo Industrial Exhibition =

1907 exhibition heldin Tokyo

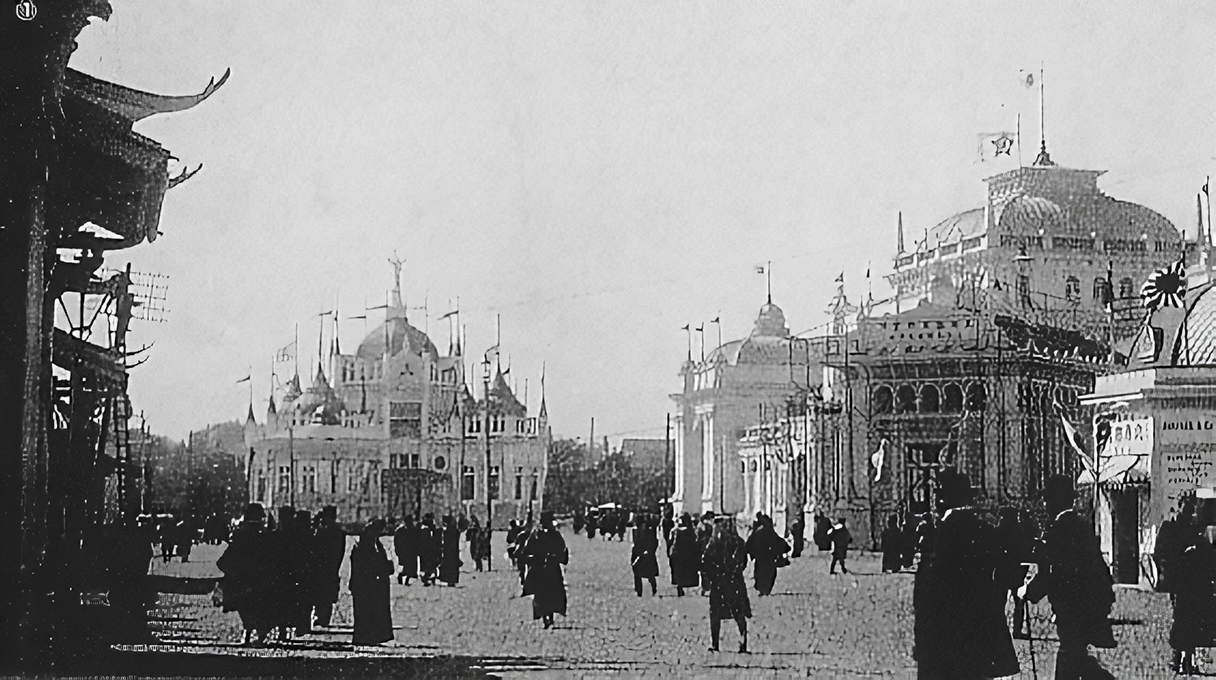

The Tokyo Industrial Exhibition (Tōkyō Kangyō Hakurankai) was held in Tokyo, Japan in 1907. Held in Ueno Park, the event celebrated Imperial Japan's economic prowess and patriotism. The event succeeded the five prior National Industrial Exhibitions, but was not organized by the central government. A sixth industrial exhibition had been postponed due to the Russo-Japanese War.

A ferris wheel was installed and featured on a postcard from the event. Electric lights were displayed. Natsume Sōseki wrote about them.

Baron Senge Takatomi was an organizer.

An illustrated catalogue of art exhibits was published. Charles Albert Francis, an American machinist working for Toyota in Tokyo, wrote an article about the event that was published with illustrations. The Museum of Fine Arts in Boston has a lithograph of the exhibition's first building. The Tokyo Industrial Exhibition, an extra number of the Teikoku Gaho, an illustrated monthly magazine, was published for the event.

The 1910 Japan–British Exhibition held in London, the 1914 Taisho Promotion Exhibition, and the 1915 Chosŏn Industrial Exposition held in Gyeongseong (Seoul) on the Korean peninsula under Japanese rule followed.

The film An Introduction to the Actual Condition of Taiwan was screened at the exposition. Artist Okada Saburōsuke won a first prize category at the event.

== See also ==
- National Industrial Exhibitions
- Fifth National Industrial Exhibition held in Osaka in 1903
