= Hakuba-kai =

1896–1911 Japanese art group

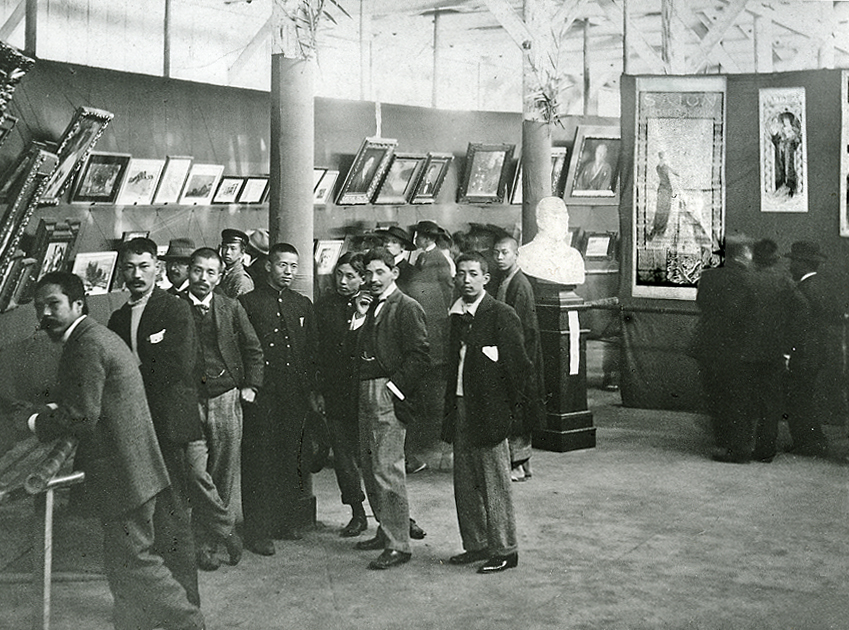
Fifth Hakubakai Exhibition (1900)

The Hakuba-kai (白馬会) or "White Horse Society" was a fluid late Meiji association of Japanese practitioners of yōga or Western-style painting. Established in June 1896, thirteen exhibitions were staged before the Society was disbanded in 1911 (the missing years being 1906, 1908, and 1911). Fuelled by disagreements over style (including the purple/brown controversy, or that between the Violet School (紫派, Murasaki-ha) and the Resin School (脂派, Yani-ha)) and the rigid bureaucratic methods of the Meiji Bijutsukai (明治美術会), hitherto the dominant yōga association, Kuroda Seiki, Kume Keiichirō, and others founded the new group, named after their favourite Shirouma (the characters can also be read Hakuba) brand of unfiltered sake. Other participating and exhibiting artists included Yamamoto Hōsui, Okada Saburōsuke, Wada Eisaku, Kobayashi Mango (小林萬吾), Aoki Shigeru, and Fujishima Takeji.

== Gallery ==
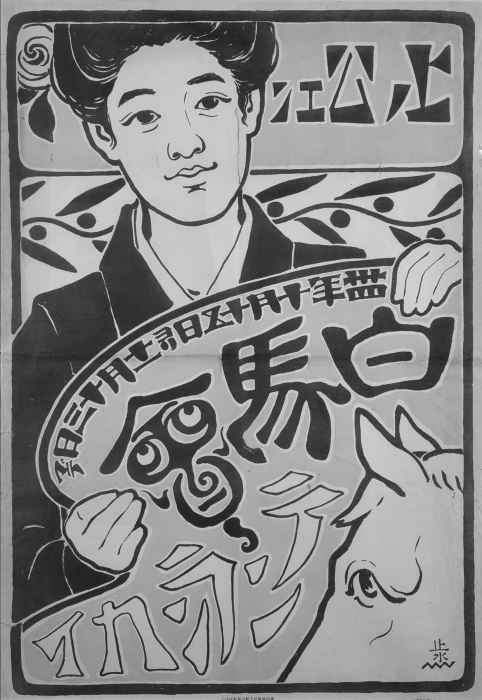
Poster for the Sixth Hakuba-kai Exhibition (1901)

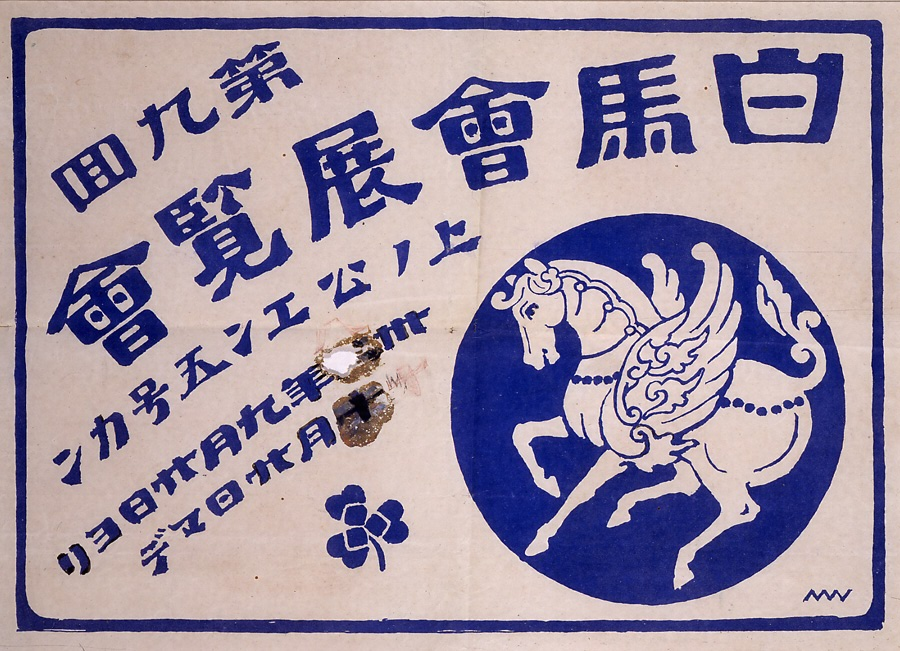
Poster for the Ninth Hakuba-kai Exhibition (1904)

== See also ==
- Nihonga
- Reminiscence of the Tempyō Era
