= Kume Keiichiro =

Japanese painter

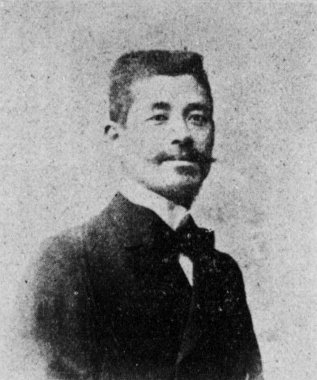
Kume Keiichiro (before 1903)

Kume Keiichiro (Japanese: 久米 桂一郎; 11 September 1866, Saga – 29 July 1934, Tokyo) was a Japanese painter in the yōga style. His father was the historian, Kume Kunitake.

== Biography ==
His father moved his family to Tokyo in 1874 after participating in the Iwakura Mission. In 1881, he attended the National Industrial Exhibition, which was primarily devoted to the economy, but also included paintings. He was deeply impressed by the Western-style art and decided to become a painter. In pursuit of the goal, he began taking lessons from Fuji Masazō (藤 雅三, 1853–1916), who had studied in Europe.

When Fuji returned to France in 1885, he followed him as soon as he could and, with Fuji's help, gained admission to the Académie Colarossi, where he studied under Raphaël Collin. While there, he became lifelong friends with Kuroda Seiki, who painted several portraits of him.

He returned to Japan in 1893, followed shortly after by Kuroda. In 1894, they founded an art school called the Tenshin-dōjō (天真道場; roughly, Heavenly Dojo), which numbered many famous artists among its graduates; notably Okada Saburōsuke. They collaborated again in 1896 to help create the artists' association, Hakuba-kai (roughly; White Horse Club, a name that was chosen during a drinking party).

In 1898, he was appointed a professor at what is now the Tokyo University of the Arts and, the following year, was part of a group of art educators that paid an official visit to France. Later, he travelled to the United States to work for the Louisiana Purchase Exhibition (1904) and the Panama–Pacific International Exposition (1915). He also served as a juror for the annual exhibitions at the Japan Art Academy.

His descendants have established an art gallery dedicated to him at a family business in Meguro.

== Selected paintings ==
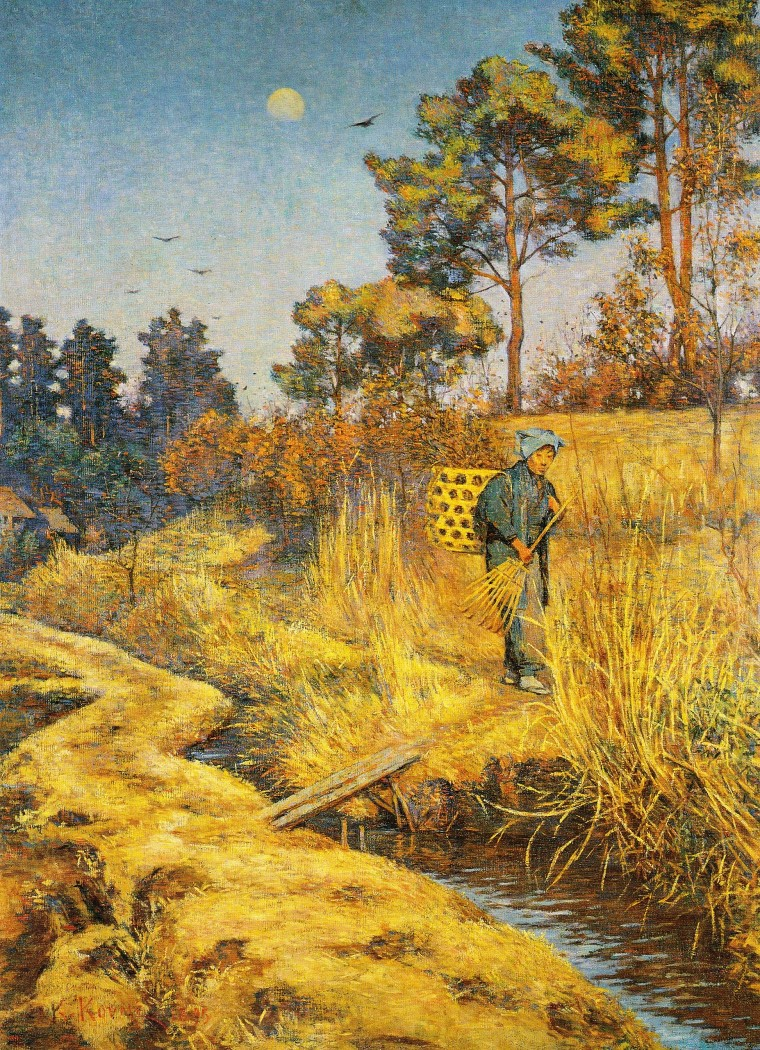
"Autumn Scenery" (1895)

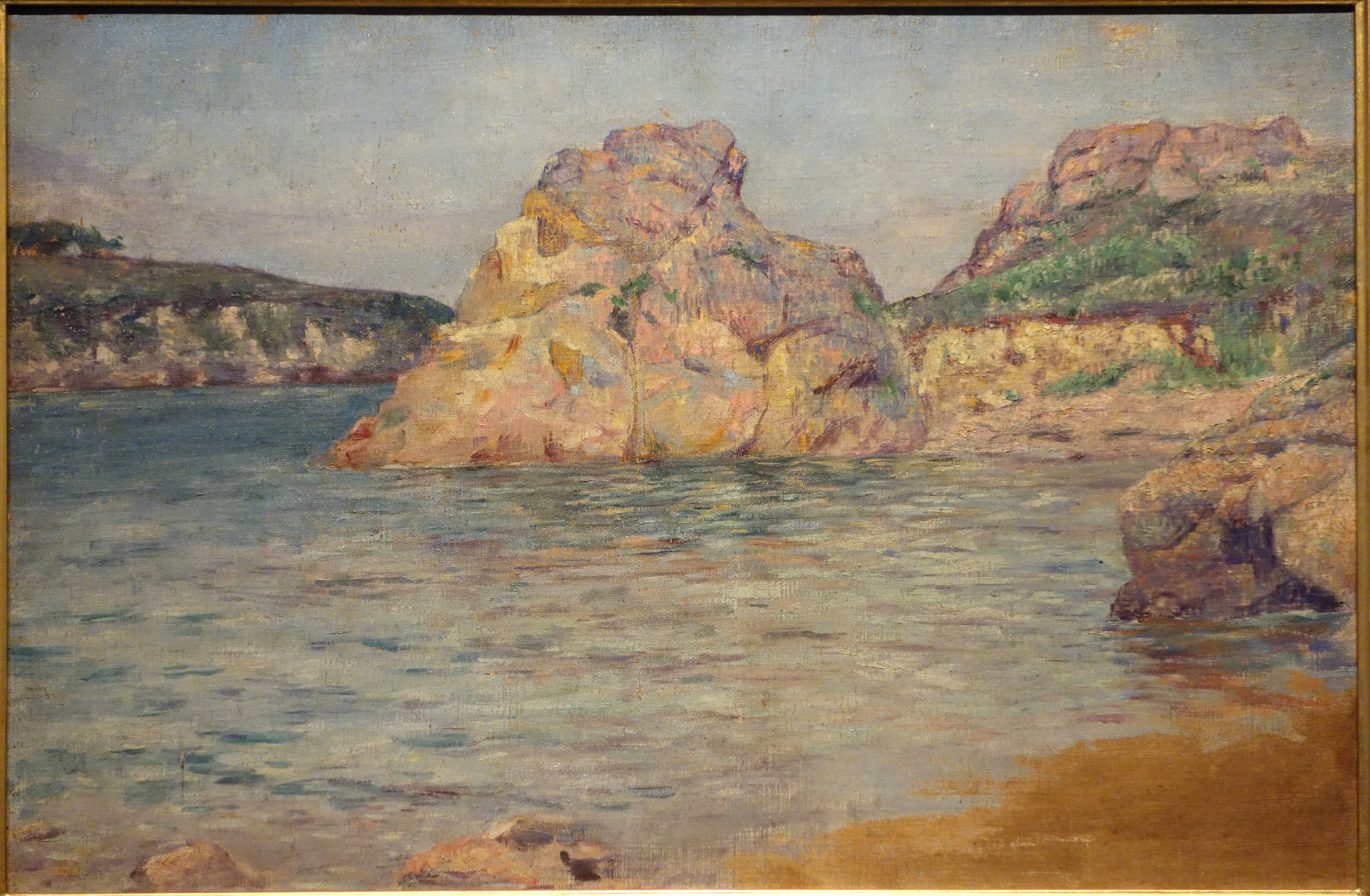
Île-de-Bréhat (1891)

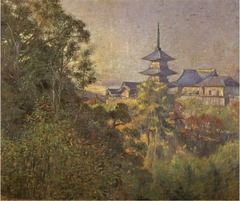
Kiyomizu Temple

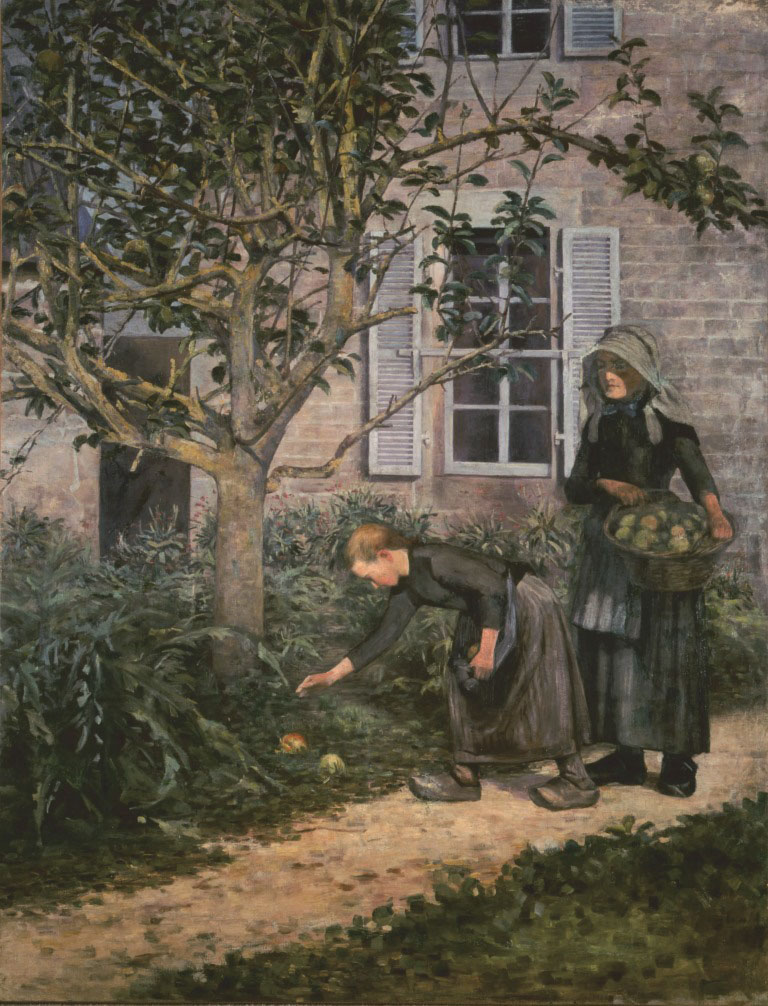
"Apple Pickers" (1892)
