= Soyama Sachihiko =

- 曽山幸彦
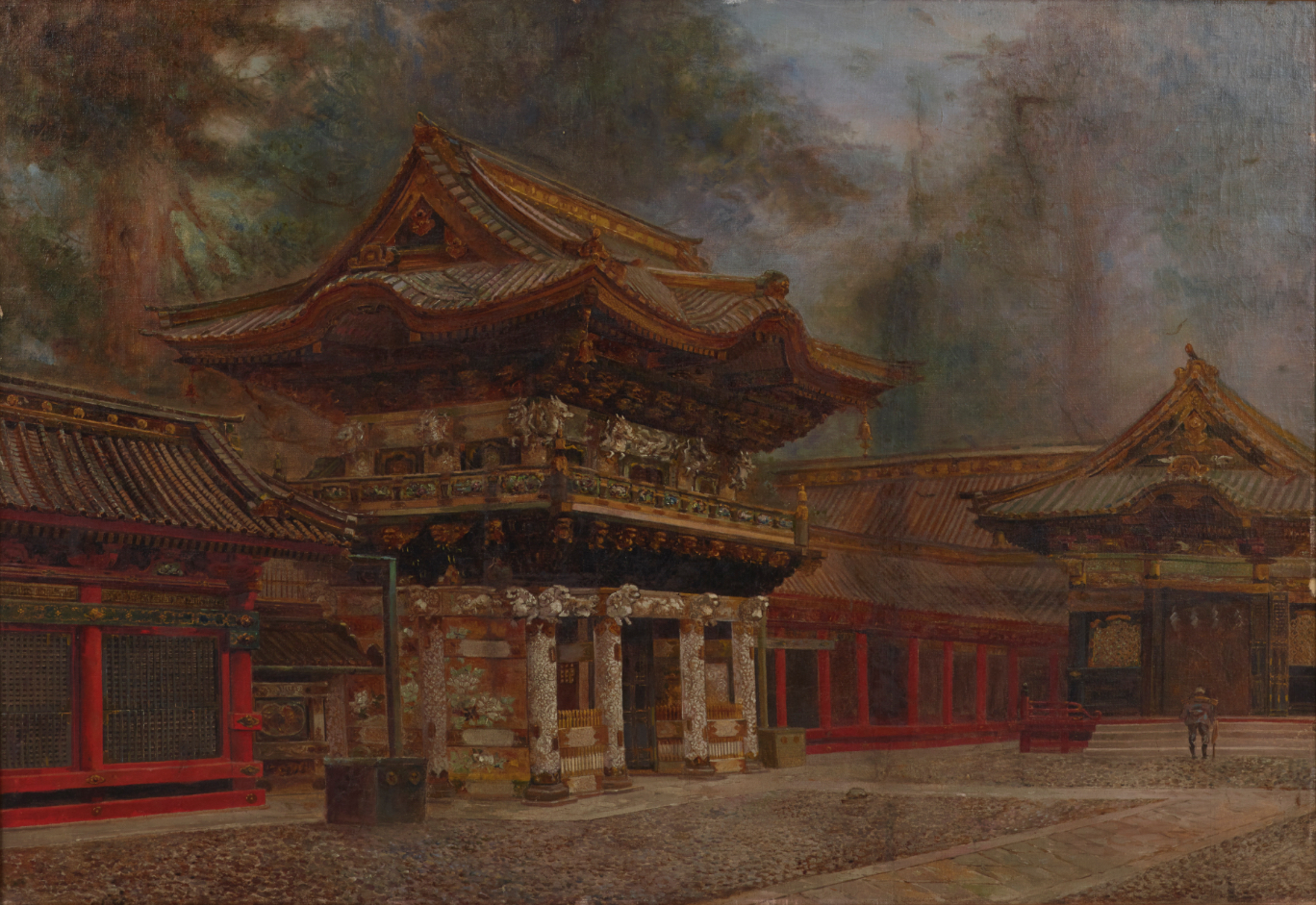
- Yōmeimon at Nikkō (1890) (Tokyo National Museum)
- Born: 1859; Satsuma Province
- Died: 1892 (aged 32–33)
- Known for: Painter
- Movement: Yōga

Soyama Sachihiko (曽山幸彦; 1859 – 1892) was a Japanese painter of the yōga (or Western-style) movement in the Meiji era. The characters of his given name may also be read Yukihiko; later he was known as Ōno Yoshiyasu (大野義康).

== Biography ==
Born in Kagoshima, he studied in Tokyo at the Technical Fine Arts School (部美術学校) under Achille San Giovanni and Giovanni Vincenzo Cappelletti (カッペレッティ). Later he became assistant professor in the Tokyo Imperial University School of Technology. He also opened his own school, the Daikōkan (大幸館). His students included Fujishima Takeji, Wada Eisaku, Okada Saburōsuke, Miyake Kokki (三宅克己), Nakazawa Hiromitsu (中沢弘光), and Yakazaki Chiyoji (矢崎千代二).

== See also ==
- Nihonga
