= An Introduction to the Actual Condition of Taiwan =

- Directed by: Toyojirō Takamatsu
- Produced by: Taiwan Dōjinsha
- Release date: 1907
- Running time: 220 minutes
- Countries: Japan, Taiwan

An Introduction to the Actual Condition of Taiwan(台湾実況紹介) is the first film ever made in Taiwan. It was commissioned by the Japanese authorities to director Toyojirō Takamatsu (1872–1952) in 1907, twelve years after Japan occupied Taiwan, as a propaganda movie showing the progress of Taiwan under Japanese rule.

== Production and release ==
Takamatsu worked through the local company Taiwan Dōjinsha and started shooting on February 17, 1907. After two months of shooting in more than a hundred locations in the island, the film was sent to Tokyo for final copy-editing.

It is generally considered a propaganda film, but there were different reasons for the project. On the one hand, the local Japanese authorities in Taiwan planned to show it to the budget subcommittee of the Imperial Diet in Tokyo to confirm that money was well spent in the island. On the other hand, since the starting of the project, a main aim was to screen the film at the 1907 Tokyo Industrial Exhibition.

After the Exhibition, it was also a commercial success and was screened in theaters in both Japan and Taiwan. According to local media, the Taiwanese premiere at the Asahi-za Theatre in Taipei was a great success. Due to unusual length of the film (220 minutes), the premiere was divided in two evenings, May 8 and 9, 1907.

In the same year 1907, Takamatsu toured Japan to show the film accompanied by five representatives of the Taiwanese indigenous peoples. Together with the director, they were granted a personal audience by Emperor Meiji in his palace in Aoyama and, upon their return to Taiwan, by Governor-General Sakuma Samata. Takamatsu was so happy about the experience that he decided to settle in Taiwan in 1908.

The success of the film induced the Governor-General to support more propaganda films and newsreels which effectively started a cinema of Taiwan. In 1934, a sound film version of the 1907 production was produced by the Governor-General's office as All Taiwan, and became the first sound film in Taiwan's history.

== Synopsis ==
The film is lost, but it is known from reviews in local newspapers that it featured a long staged scene of Japanese military repressing a revolt by Taiwanese indigenous people. The aboriginal theme reportedly occupied the longer part of the film. Others were devoted to depicting scenic locations, and the production of "exotic" goods such as bananas and coconuts. The film was criticized for presenting a romantic, exotic, and colonial view of Taiwan, ignoring its more modern industrial products and social problems.
