= Tennōji Park =

Park in Osaka, Japan

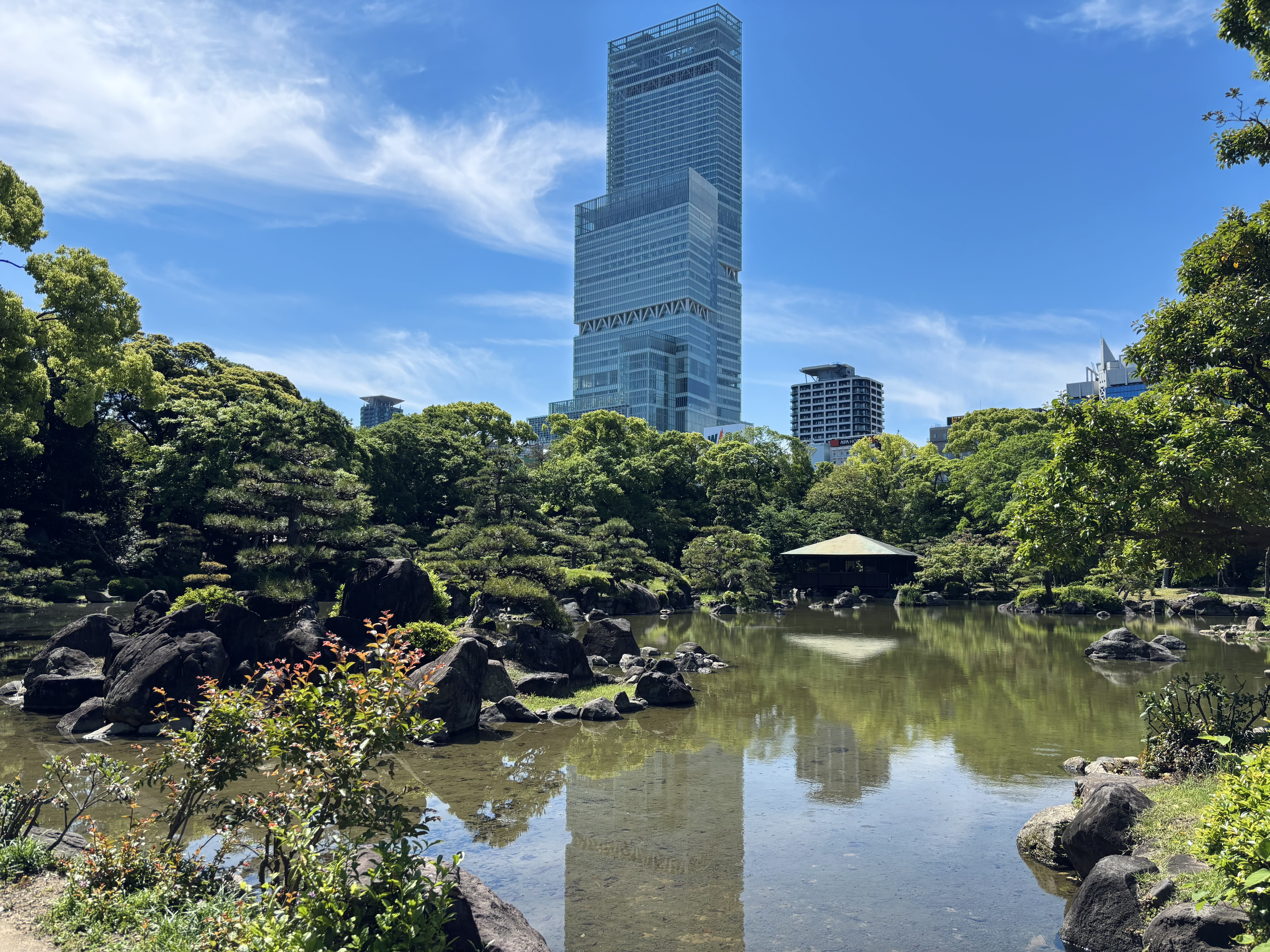
- Keitakuen Garden and Abeno Harukas
- Interactive map of Tennōji Park
- Type: public park
- Location: 1-108, Chausuyama-cho, Tennōji-ku, Osaka, Japan
- Coordinates: 34°39′00″N 135°30′36″E
- Area: 28.8 hectares (71 acres)
- Created: 1909
- Operator: Osaka City
- Status: No entrance fee, Open all day

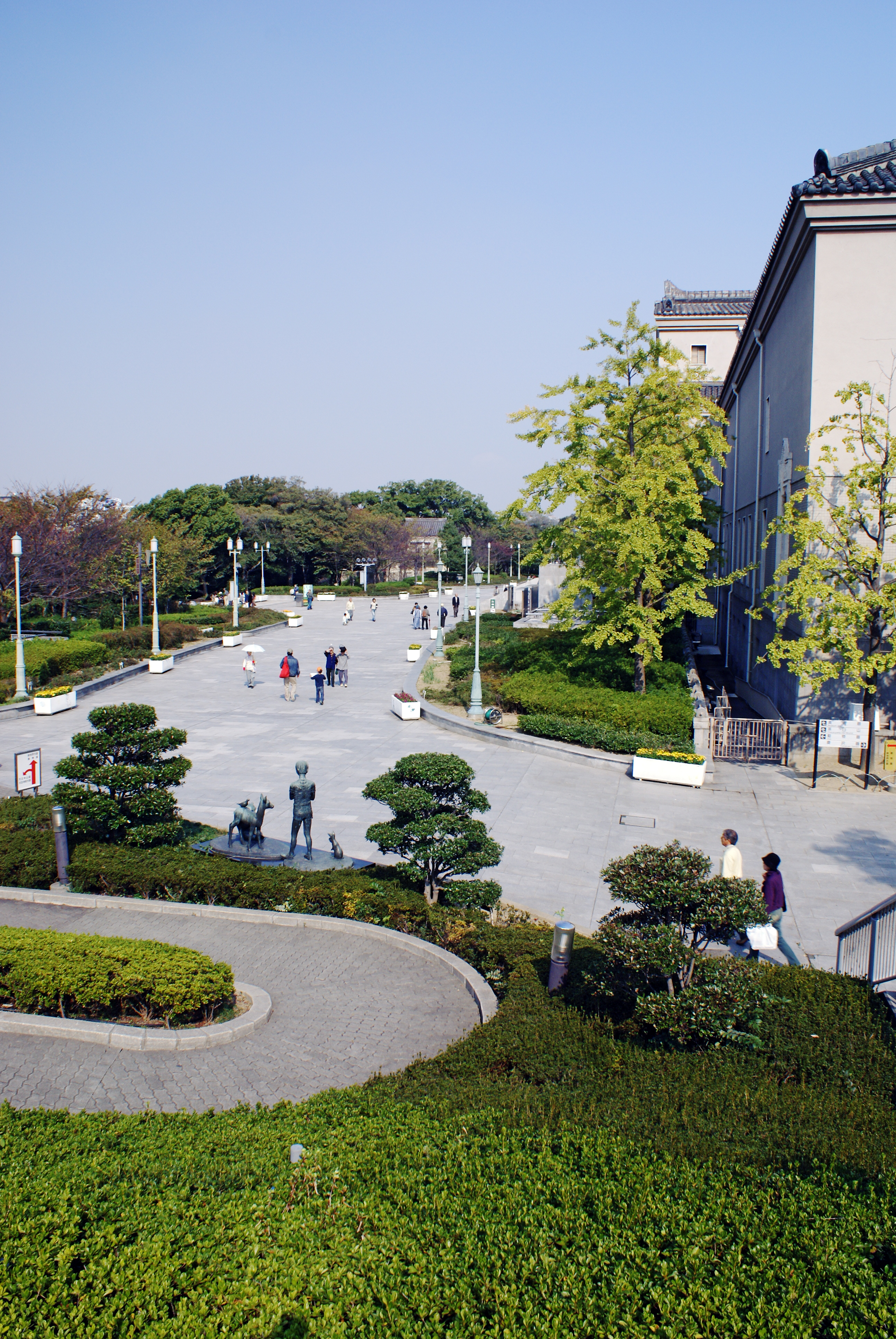
In front of the Osaka Municipal Museum of Art

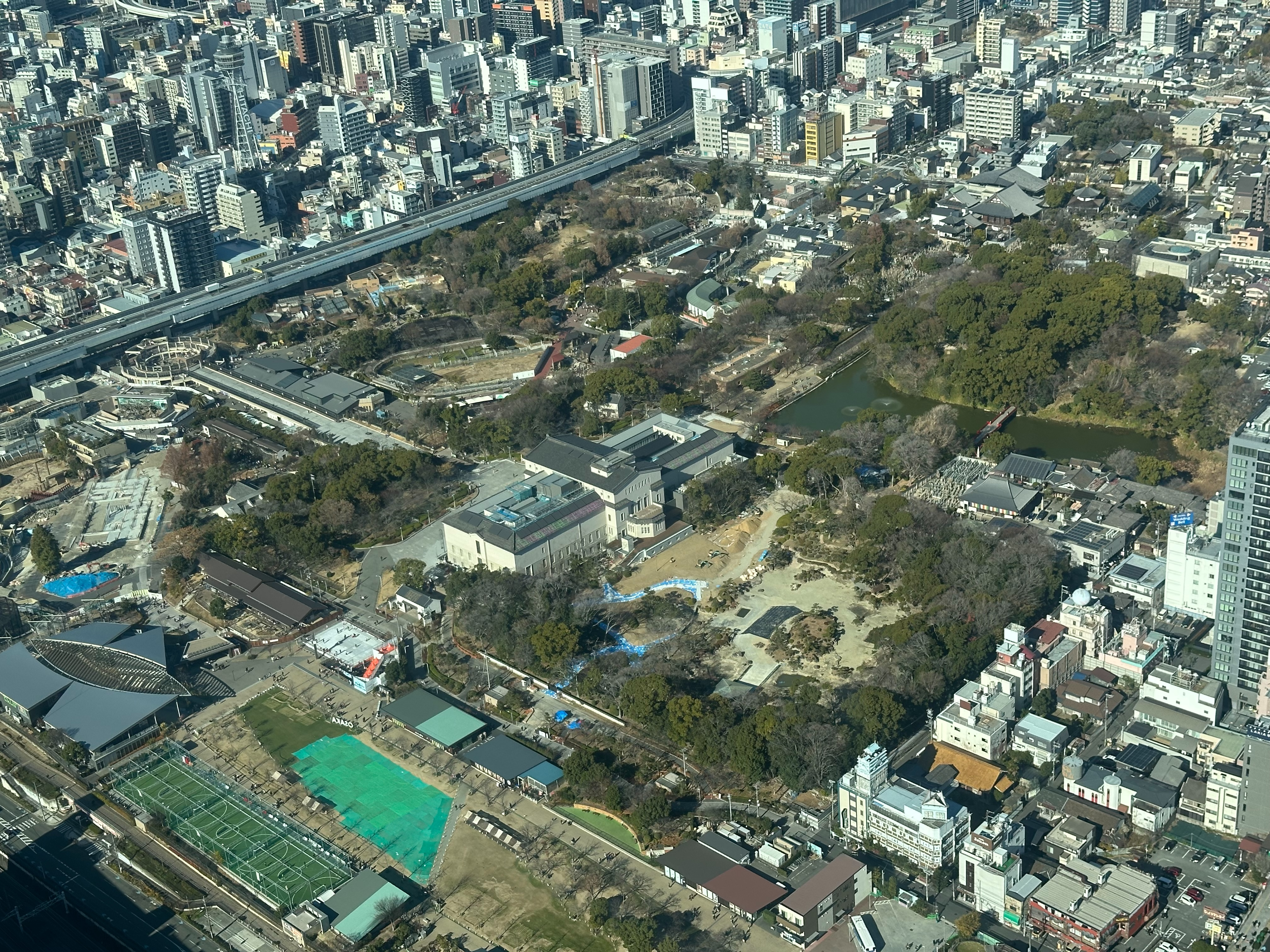
Tennōji Park from above, 2025

The Tennōji Park (天王寺公園, Tennōji Kōen) is a park with botanical garden at 1–108, Chausuyama-cho, Tennōji-ku, Osaka, Japan.

== Establishments ==
- Tennōji Zoo
- Osaka Municipal Museum of Art
- Greenhouse
- Keitakuen
- Chausuyama Tomb

=== Tenshiba Area ===
Restaurants, cafes, vegetable and fruit market, FamilyMart convenience store, Futsal courts, and Kintetsu Friendly Hostel Osaka-Tennoji Park are located in the Tenshiba Area.

== Access ==
Tennoji Gate
- Osaka Metro
  - Midosuji Line, Tanimachi Line: Tennoji Station
- JR West
  - Yamatoji Line, Osaka Loop Line, Hanwa Line: Tennoji Station
- Kintetsu
  - Minami Osaka Line: Osaka Abenobashi Station
Shinsekai Gate
- Osaka Metro
  - Sakaisuji Line: Ebisucho Station
  - Midosuji Line, Sakaisuji Line: Dobutsuen-mae Station

== History ==
The Park was established in 1909 after the demolished of the buildings of the Fifth National Industrial Exhibition. With the zoo following in 1919.

== See also ==
- List of botanical gardens in Japan
