= Fifth National Industrial Exhibition =

1903 exposition held in Japan

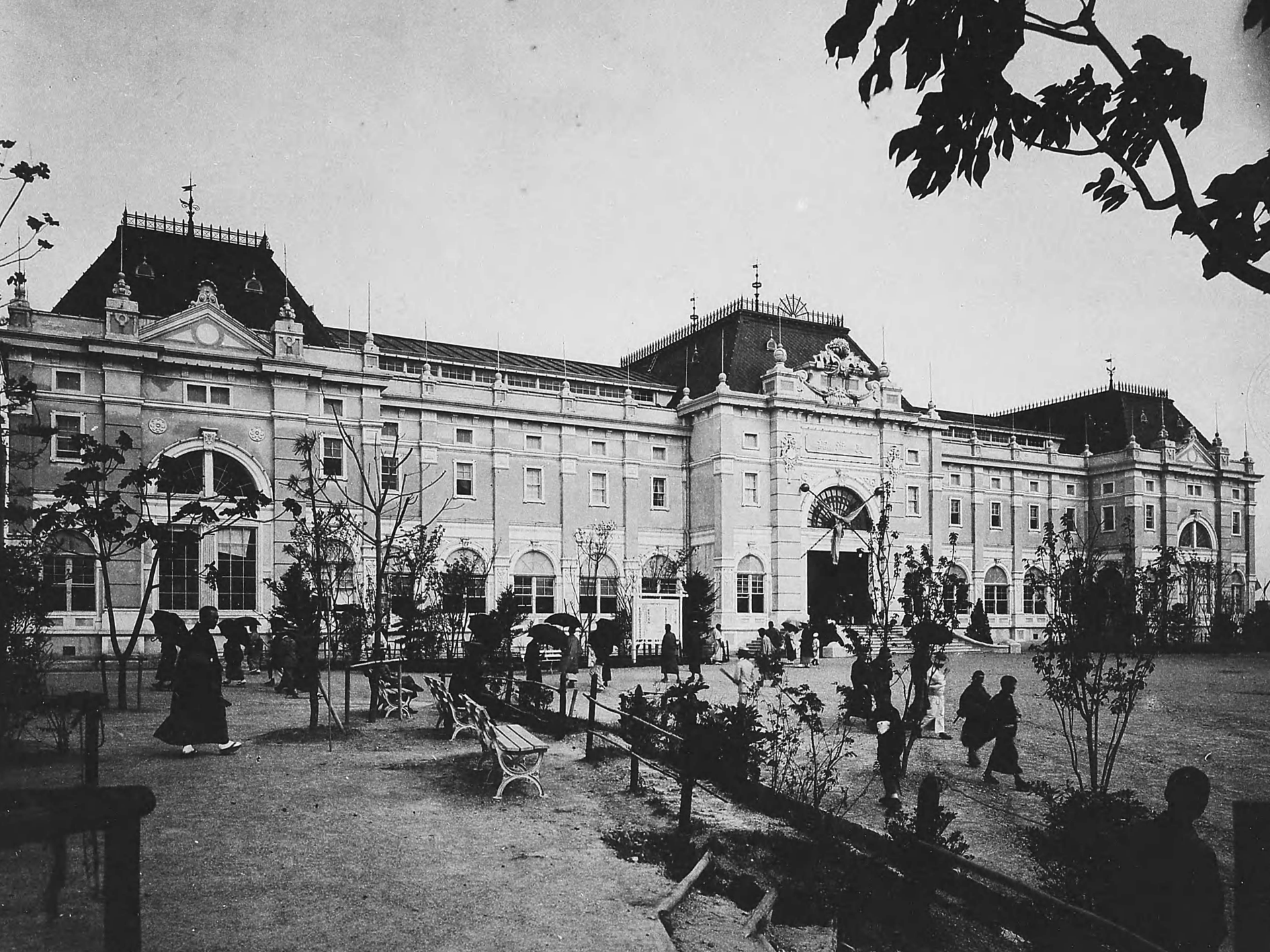

Overview
- BIE-class: Unrecognized exposition
- Name: Fifth National Industrial Exhibition
- Area: 93.5 acres
- Visitors: 4,350,693

Participant(s)
- Countries: 16
- Organizations: 47 prefectures

Location
- Country: Empire of Japan
- City: Osaka
- Venue: Tennōji Park
- Coordinates: 34°39′09″N 135°30′31″E

Timeline
- Opening: 1 March 1903
- Closure: 31 July 1903

The Fifth National Industrial Exhibition was held in Osaka, Japan in 1903. It was the first to be open to foreign exhibitors, and twice the size of previous National Industrial Exhibitions. It was the fifth and final of the centrally planned National Industrial Exhibitions though exhibitions such as the one in 1907 in Tokyo followed.

== Summary ==
The fair ran from 1 March 1903 until 31 July, with formal opening by the emperor on 20 April. It was held in the location now occupied by Tennōji Zoo, Tennōji Park. There were 4,350,693 visitors; 959,516 additionally visited the aquarium, which cost extra. This was the largest event held in Japan to date.

The buildings were destroyed after the fair, and the Tennōji Park established there.

== Participants ==
The 47 Japanese prefectures all participated, as did 16 counties and colonies. Countries included Belgium, China, France, Germany, the United Kingdom, and the United States.

== Pavilions ==
In the entertainment section, there was a theatre, a tower with a lift, a Mystery Building, and a two-storey wooden Human Pavilion. The Human Pavilion exhibited Ainu, Okinawan, and Korean people, in addition to people from Africa, India and the Malay peninsula, who cost 10 sen more to attend.

The Aichi prefecture building was built to look like a castle.

The Formosan pavilion aimed to celebrate Japanese colonial rule, but it wasn't of much interest to Japanese people. Two buildings were moved from the island to provide a shrine of Prince Kitashirakawa and a Bugaku dance stage.
