= Raphaël Collin =

French painter (1850–1916)

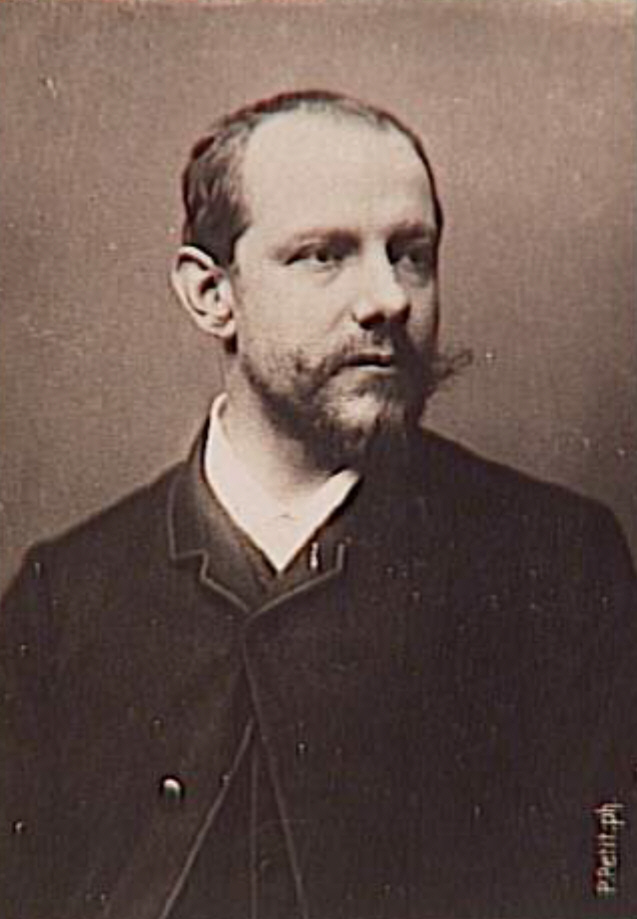
- Raphaël Collin
- Born: Louis-Joseph-Raphaël Collin; 17 June 1850; Paris, France
- Died: 21 October 1916 (aged 66); Brionne, France
- Known for: Painting, Ceramics

Louis-Joseph-Raphaël Collin (French pronunciation: [lwi ʒozɛf ʁafaɛl kɔlɛ̃]; 17 June 1850 – 21 October 1916) was a French painter born and raised in Paris, where he became a prominent academic painter and a teacher. He is principally known for the links he created between French and Japanese art, in both painting and ceramics.

== Early life ==
Collin studied at the school of Saint-Louis, then went to Verdun where he was at school with Jules Bastien-Lepage; they became close friends. Collin then went to Paris and studied in the atelier of Bouguereau and then joined Lepage at Alexandre Cabanel's atelier where they both worked alongside Fernand Cormon, Aimé Morot and Benjamin Constant. Collin painted still-lives, nudes, portraits and genre pieces, and preferred to render his subjects en plein air with a clear and luminous palette.

== Career ==
Around 1873 he began successfully exhibiting at the Salon. He won a number of prizes that helped launch his career, and before long he was receiving increasingly prestigious commissions to paint large scale murals in major public buildings around Paris, including some of the most prominent cultural centers of Paris: the Hôtel de Ville, the Théatre de l'éon, and the Opéra-Comique. He provided designs for decorative plates made by Théodore Deck.

Collin's early work closely followed the essential tenets of French academism. Like the Renaissance painters they admired, the nineteenth-century academicians used historical, religious, or allegorical painting to communicate an idea. Within the parameters of this literary art, Collin made subtle modifications to the accepted academic style, introducing elements of the impressionist technique into his allegorical scenes. Such formal techniques as formal composition and bright color evoked the light filled landscapes of impressionism rather than the dark chiaroscuro of Renaissance painting.

During the last few decades of the nineteenth century, academic painting in France was in crisis, eclipsed by the new artistic movements of impressionism and symbolism. Collin's friendship with members of the impressionists provided him with insights into the new direction contemporary painting was taking. He adapted his work accordingly and in such paintings as Young Woman, he found a compromise between the academic style and the new painterly innovations of the impressionists and the Nabis. Collin began to emphasize the picture surface by reducing the spatial depth of his paintings as well as composing with areas of concentrated color. Yet he never completely abandoned the hallmarks of academicism: allegory and naturalism.

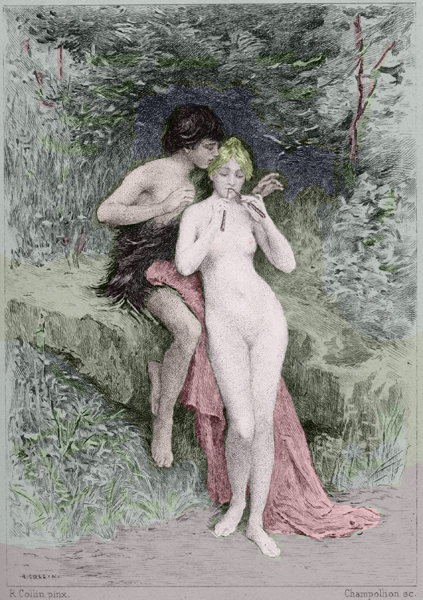
Daphnis et Chloé

Collin figured prominently in artistic exchanges between Paris and Tokyo during the late nineteenth century as Kuroda Seiki, Kume Keiichirō, and Okada Saburōsuke, among others, studied in his studio and at the Académie Colarossi, where Collin was associated. Kuroda and Kume, who subsequently assumed professorships at the Tokyo Fine Arts School (Tokyo Bijutsu Gakkō), were especially instrumental in introducing to Japan Collin's academic teaching methods as well as the lighter palette, brushwork, and plein air approach he espoused. This mentorship of the first generation of Japanese oil painters contributed to the special respect he continues to enjoy in Japan.

Collin also illustrated many books, notably Daphnis and Chloé (1890) and Chansons de Bilitis (1906).

== Honours ==
- 1889 Grand Prix, Exposition Universelle
- 1894 Officier of the Légion d'honneur
- Chevalier of the order of St Michael of Bavaria
- Order of the Rising Sun of Japan

== Gallery ==
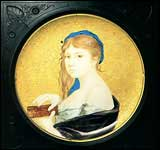
Théodore Deck plate,
decorated by Collin,
Musée du Petit Palais, Paris

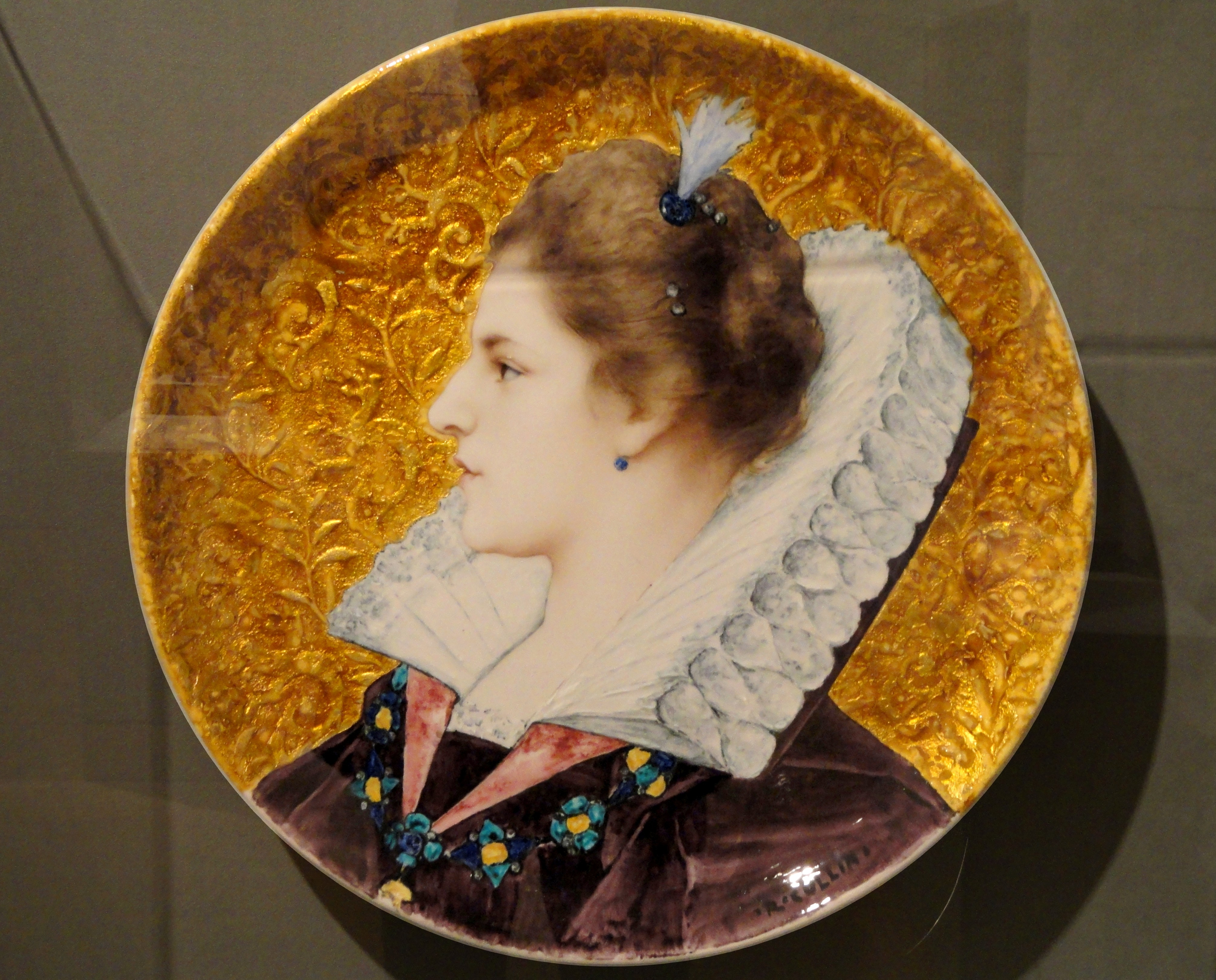
Théodore Deck plate,
decorated by Collin,
Indianapolis Museum of Art

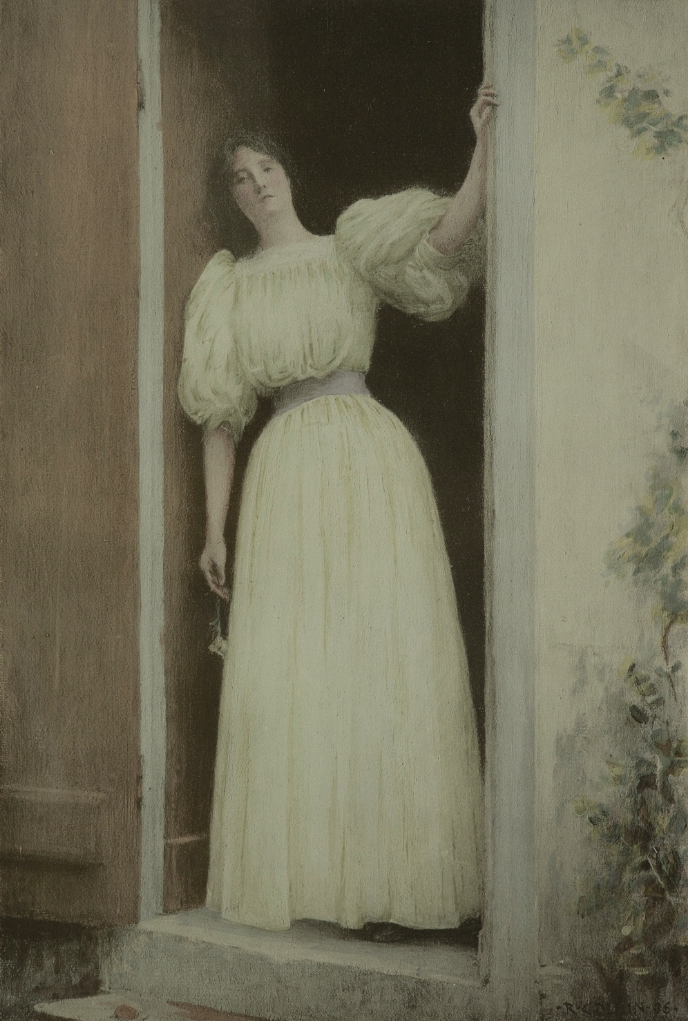
Departure, lithographic print from L'Estampe Moderne

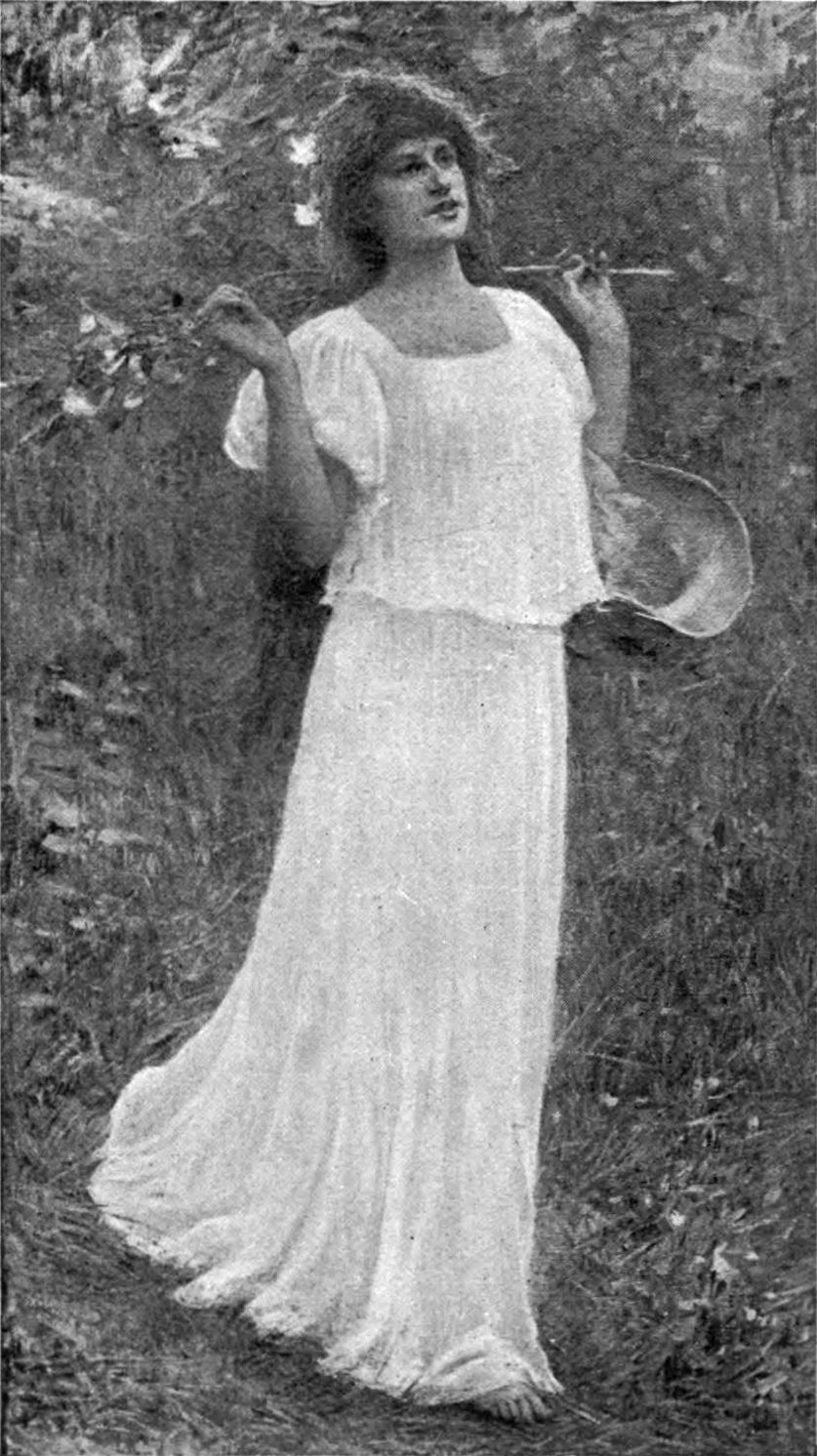
The Light Song, decoration for the comic opera

== Principal works ==
- Idylle, 1875
- Daphnis & Chloé, 1877 (exhibited at the Musée des Beaux-Arts et de la Dentelle, Alençon)
- Portrait of the artist’s father, 1887
- Portrait of M S Hayem, 1879
- Portrait of Mlle C, 1880
- La Musique, 1880
- Petits portraits en plein air, 1881
- Idylle, 1882
- Été, 1884
- Floréal, 1886
- Fin d’été & Jeunesse Sorbonne, 1889
- Plafond pour l’Odéon, 1891
- Au bord de la mer, 1892
