= Okada Saburōsuke =

Japanese painter

- 岡田三郎助
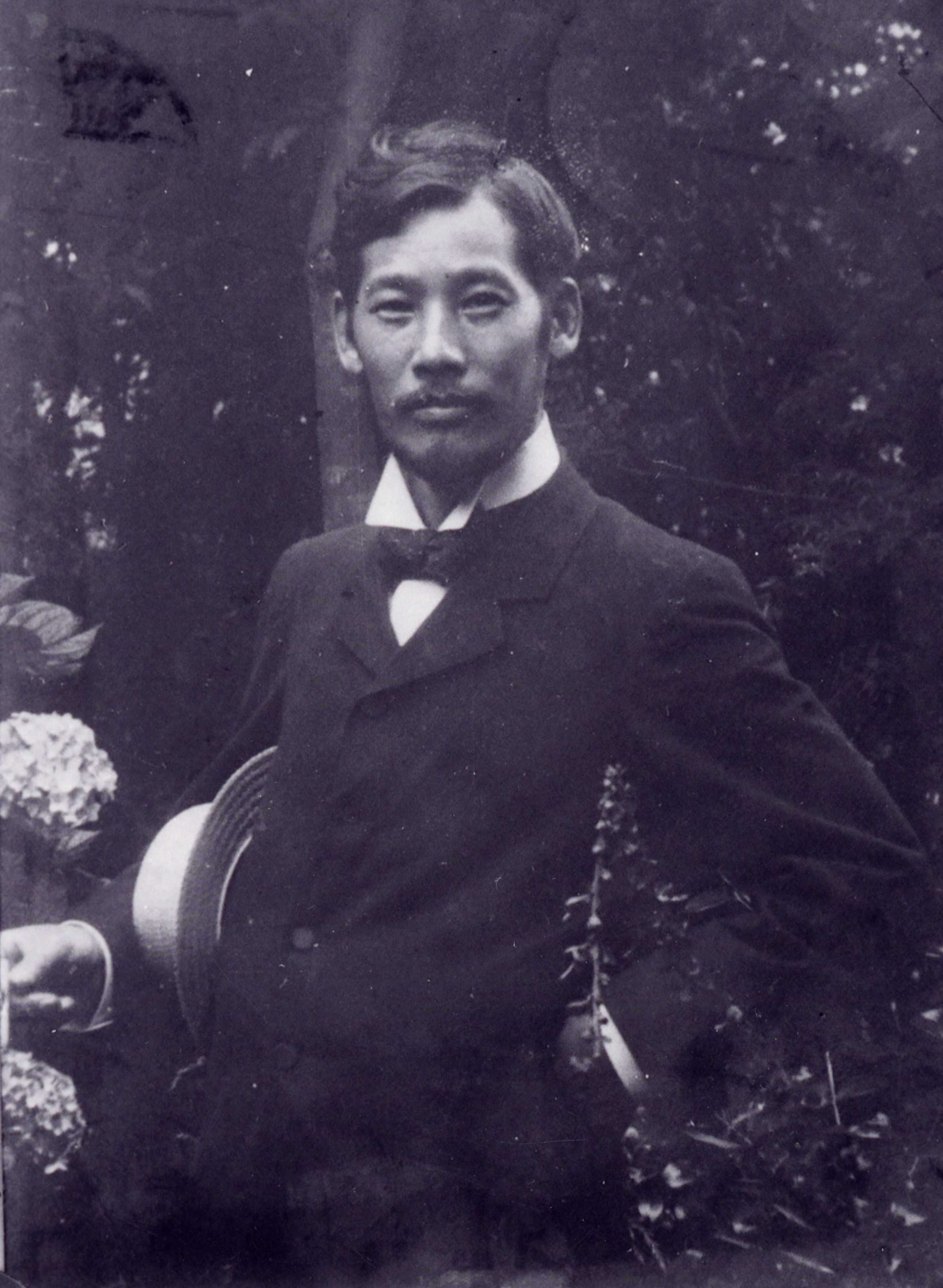
- Okada Saburōsuke (1906)
- Born: 12 January 1869; Saga Prefecture, Japan
- Died: 23 September 1939 (aged 70); Tokyo, Japan
- Education: Soyama Yukihiko, Horie Masaaki
- Alma mater: Soyama Yukihiko's studio; Taikokan studio; Tenshin Dojo studio
- Known for: Founder of Hongō Painting Institute, painter
- Notable work: Portrait of a Lady 婦人像; Women in Red; Japanese Bush Clover; Portrait of Marquess Ookuma's Wife
- Style: Yōga
- Awards: Order of Culture, (1937); First prize of the Tokyo Industrial Exhibition for Image of a Woman (Purple tone) . (1907)"

Japanese name
- Kanji: 岡田三郎助

Okada Saburōsuke (岡田 三郎助; Japanese pronunciation: [o.ka.da (|) sa.bɯ.ɾoꜜː.sɯ̥.ke], 12 January 1869, Saga – 23 September 1939, Tokyo) was a Japanese painter in the Yōga style and a professor at the "Tōkyō Bijutsu Gakkō" (School of Fine Arts); precursor of the Tokyo University of the Arts.

== Biography ==
His parents were vassals of the samurai Nabeshima clan. He attended a school that taught western-style painting, under the tutelage of Soyama Sachihiko (曽山幸彦). In 1891, he became a member of the "Meiji Bijutsu-kai" (Fine Arts Society) and, after Soyama's premature death, worked with Horie Moriaki (堀江正章, 1852–1932), completing his studies in 1893.

That same year, he came under the influence of Kuroda Seiki (黒田清輝) and Kume Keiichiro (久米桂一郎), who had just returned from France. They introduced him the Barbizon school and the concept of plein-air painting. In 1896, he became an Assistant Professor of Yōga art at the Tōkyō Bijutsu Gakkō. He was also one of the founding members of "Hakuba-kai" (White Horse Society); a loosely organized artists' association, supposedly named after their favorite type of sake.

Later, the Ministry of Culture awarded him a stipend to study in France, where he worked with Raphaël Collin. When he returned in 1902, he was named a full professor. Shortly after, he married the daughter of playwright Osanai Kaoru (小山内薫). After 1907, he served as a juror for the annual art exhibition held by the Ministry (the "Mombushō Tenrankai"). In 1912, he and Fujishima Takeji (藤島武二) founded the "Hongo Institute for Western Painting". Seven years later, he was elected a member of the "Teikoku Bijutsu-in" (Imperial Academy of Fine Arts) and was awarded the Order of the Sacred Treasure.

In 1930, the Ministry of Culture sent him to Europe to speak with Hasegawa Kiyoshi and explore the possibility of staging an exhibition of modern Japanese art. Four years later, he was appointed an Imperial Household Artist.

In 1937, Okada received the Order of Culture., the highest honor in the Japanese cultural world. Overall, his art career showed an unusually smooth progression. Okada's painting subjects included both landscapes and portraits, and he was especially good at painting portraits of women. Under his brush, women were portrayed with warm skin textures, elegant features, and delicate traits. In 1907 he won the first prize of the Tokyo Industrial Exhibition for "Image of a Woman (Purple tone)". Later, he exhibited "Women in Red", "Japanese Bush Clover", and the "Portrait of Marquess Ookuma's Wife", establishing his reputation in painting portraits of women.

== Selected paintings ==
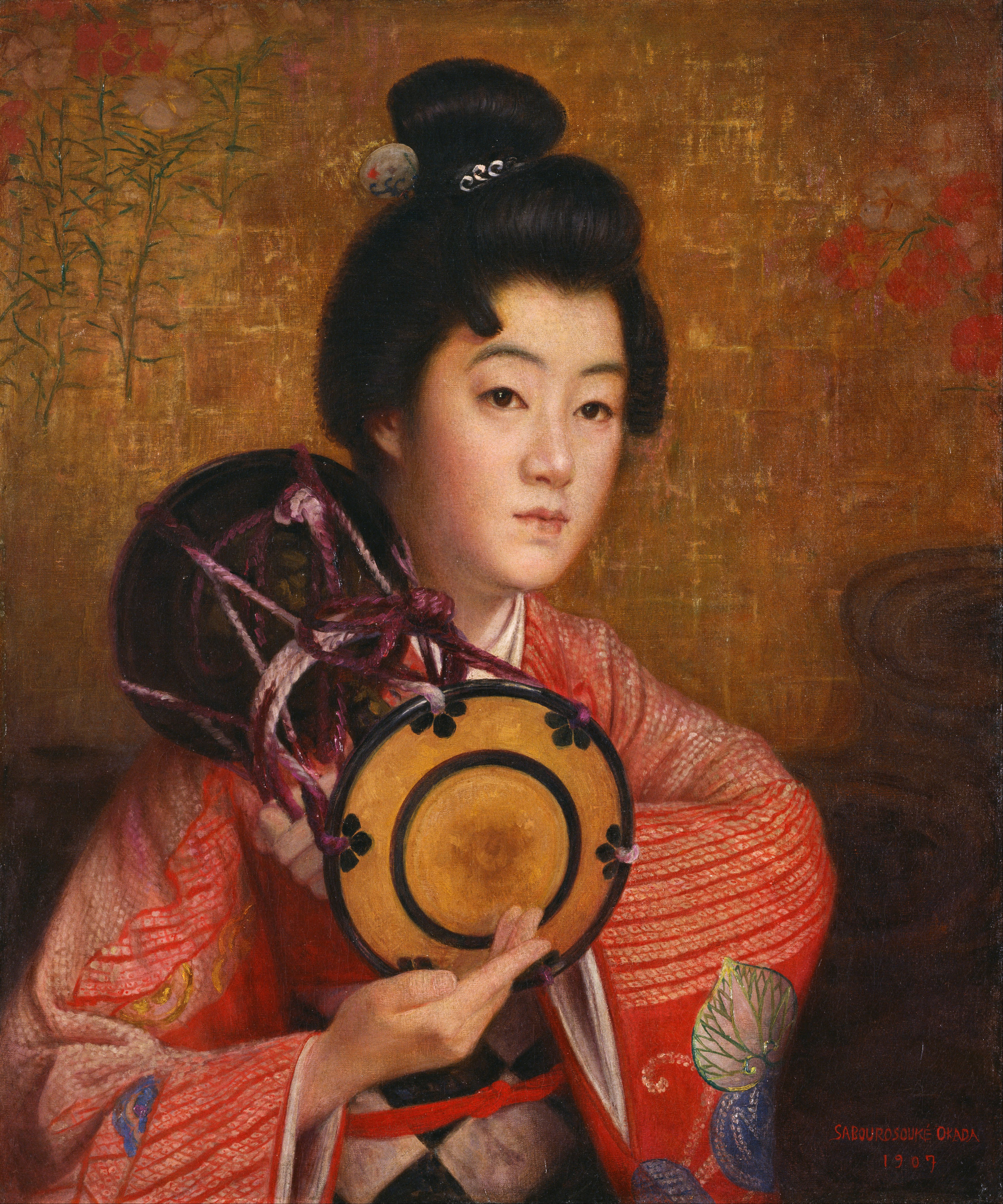
Portrait of a Lady

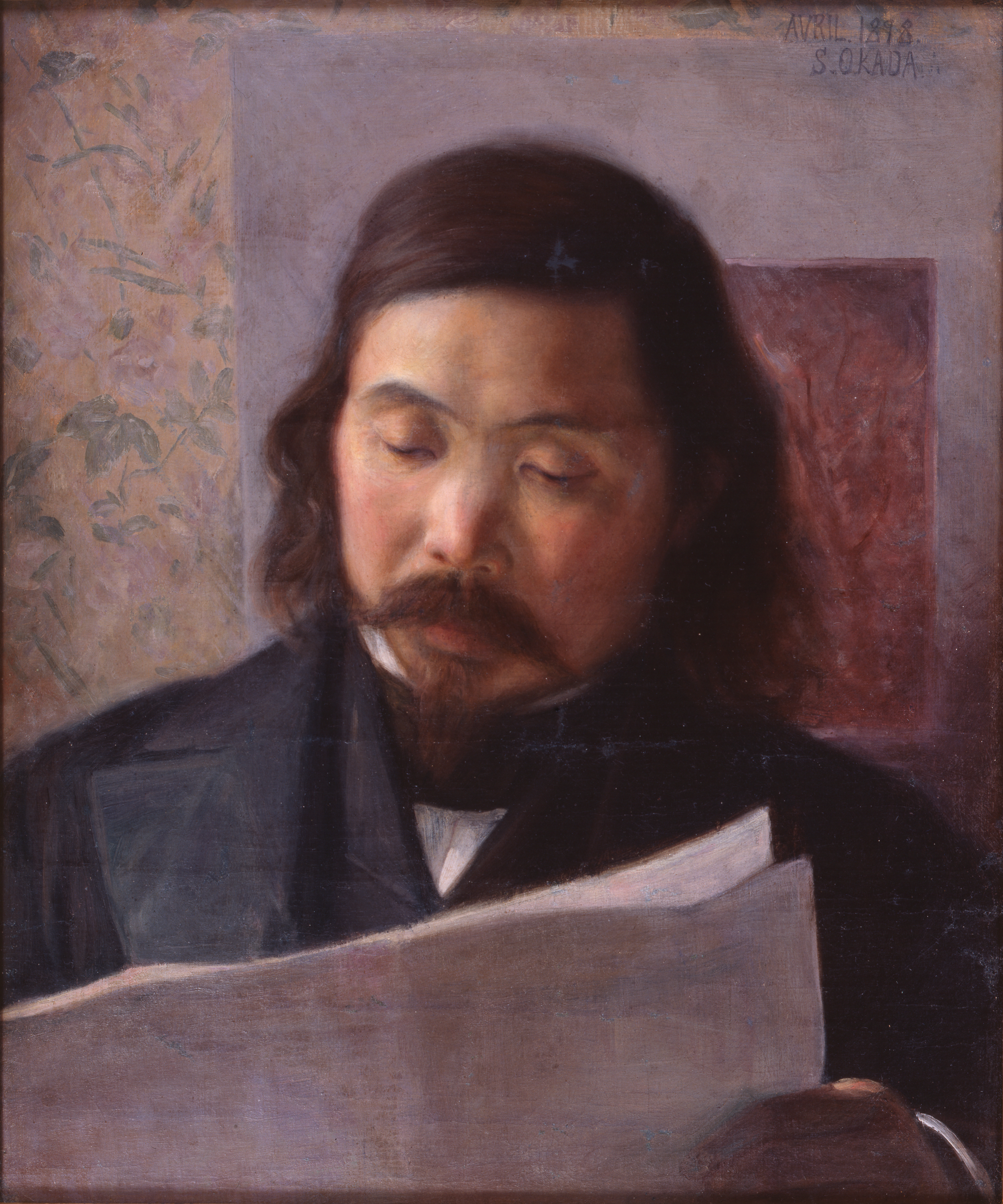
Portrait of Jirō Okabe (Conservative politician,
1864-1925)

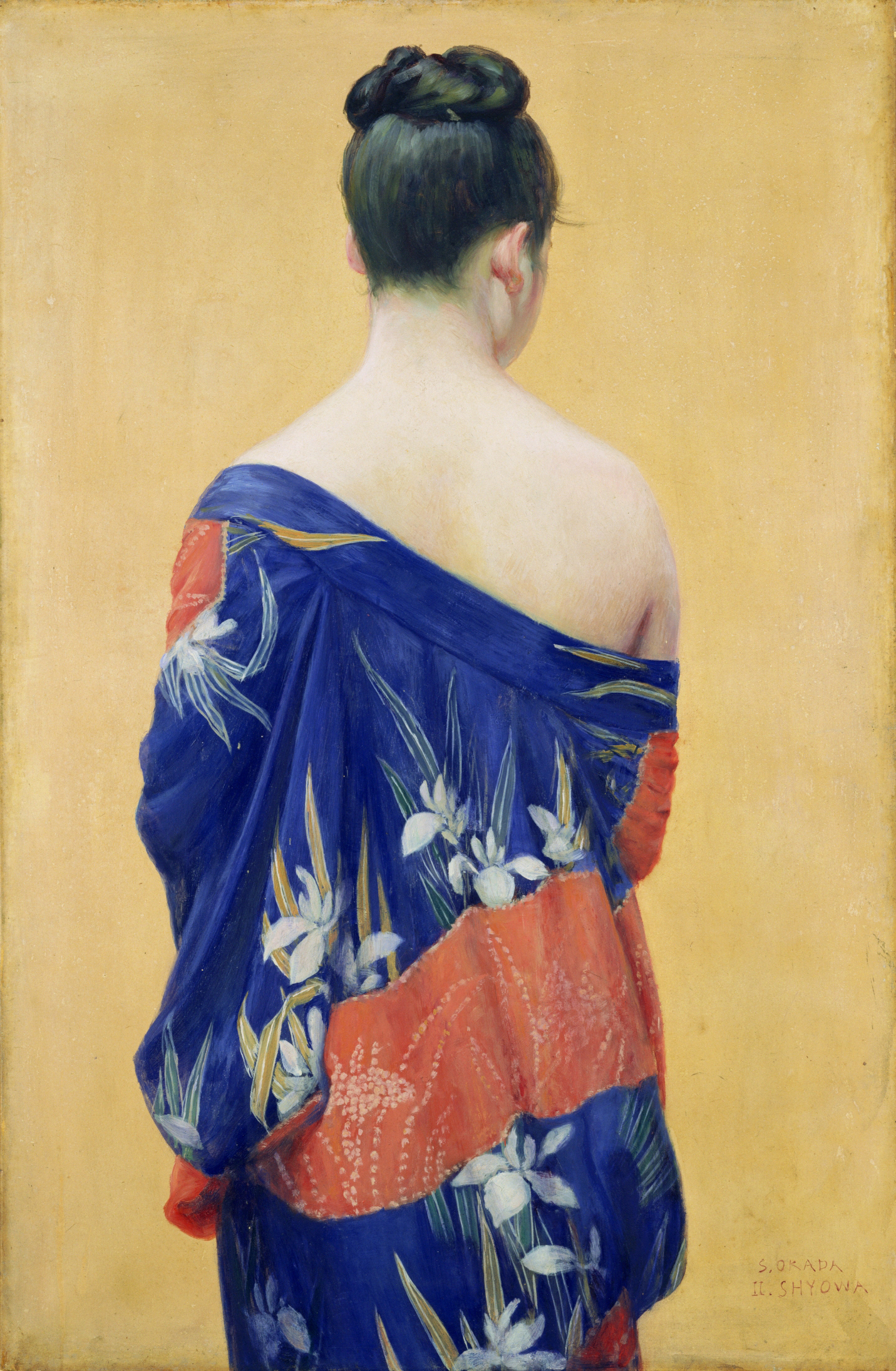
Kimono with Iris Pattern

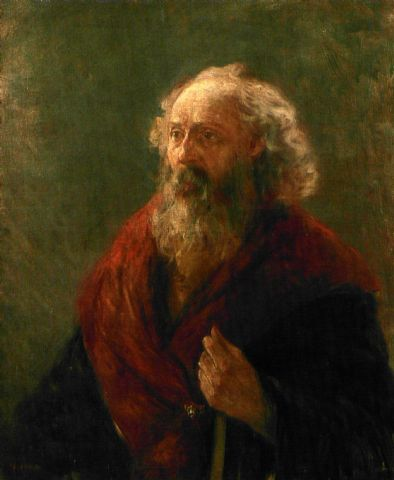
Portrait of an Old Man
