= National Industrial Exhibitions =

Events in Japan (1877–1903)

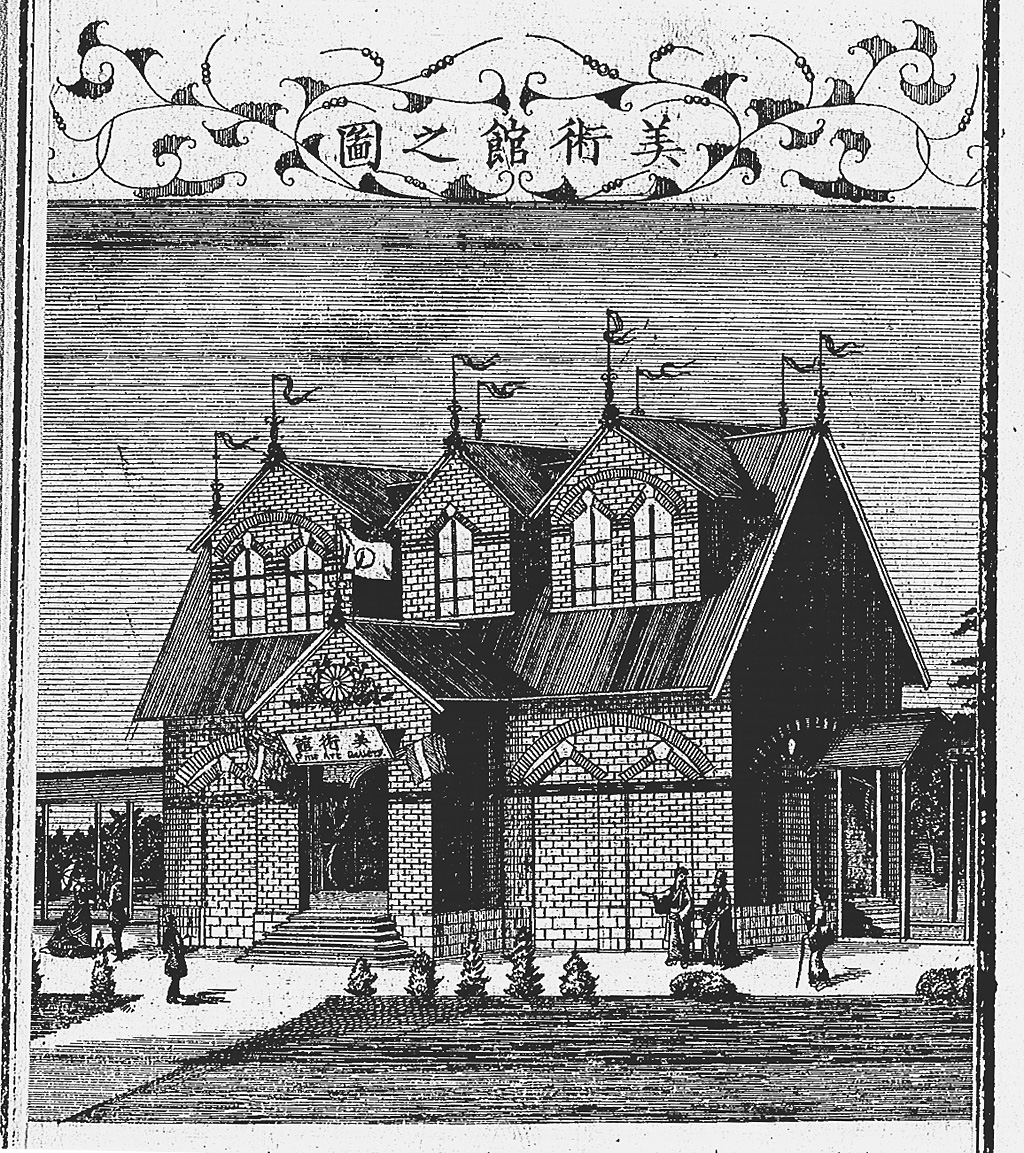
Fine Arts Building from the First National Industrial Exhibition, by architect Hayashi Tadayoshi (林忠恕), Japan's first "Bijutsukan" (美術館)

The National Industrial Exhibitions (内国勧業博覧会, Naikoku Kangyō Hakurankai) were a series of five exhibitions in Meiji Japan, staged between 1877 and 1903, the first three in Tokyo, the fourth in Kyoto, the last in Osaka.

== First National Industrial Exhibition (1877) ==
Staged in Ueno Park in Tokyo from 21 August to 30 November 1877, the first National Industrial Exhibition ran for 102 days and drew 454,168 visitors, an average of 4,453 visitors per day. Sponsored by Ōkubo Toshimichi, first head of the Home Ministry, it was inspired by Japan's participation in the 1873 Vienna World's Fair. The venue included a Fine Art Building, Japan's first so-called bijutsukan or art gallery, a term coined in relation to the National Industrial Exhibitions, and later repurposed for more permanent art museums. There was also an Agricultural Production Building, Machinery Building, Horticultural Building, and Animal Building. Exhibits were judged based on their "materials, manufacturing methods, quality, adjustment, effectiveness, value and price".

== Second National Industrial Exhibition (1881) ==
Staged in Ueno Park in Tokyo from 1 March to 30 June 1881, the second National Industrial Exhibition ran for 122 days and drew 823,094 visitors (including the Meiji Emperor and Empress Shōken), an average of 6,747 visitors per day. It was sponsored by the Ministry of Finance as well as the Home Ministry, and featured four times as many exhibits as the first, this time arranged by categories rather than prefectures, so as to encourage competition between exhibitors.

== Third National Industrial Exhibition (1890) ==
Staged in Ueno Park in Tokyo from 1 April to 31 July 1890, the third National Industrial Exhibition ran for 122 days and drew 1,023,693 visitors, an average of 8,391 visitors per day. With the backing of Sano Tsunetami, it was initially planned as an Asian Exposition (アジア博覧会), but due to the opposition of Finance Minister Matsukata Masayoshi and others, it was eventually held as the Third National Industrial Exhibition, although a foreign flavour was retained, with invitations sent and attendees from abroad. The Exhibition featured the country's first electric tram.

== Fourth National Industrial Exhibition (1895) ==
Staged in Okazaki Park (岡崎公園) to the south of Heian Jingū in Kyoto from 1 April to 31 July 1895, the fourth National Industrial Exhibition ran for 122 days and drew 1,136,695 visitors, an average of 9,317 visitors per day. At the Machinery Building, electricity replaced coal, while an electric tram operated outside the venue for the first time domestically. Display of a painting of a nude, Kuroda Seiki's Morning Toilette (destroyed in the Second World War), occasioned a press furore, with scandalized critics condemning the decline in public standards of decency.

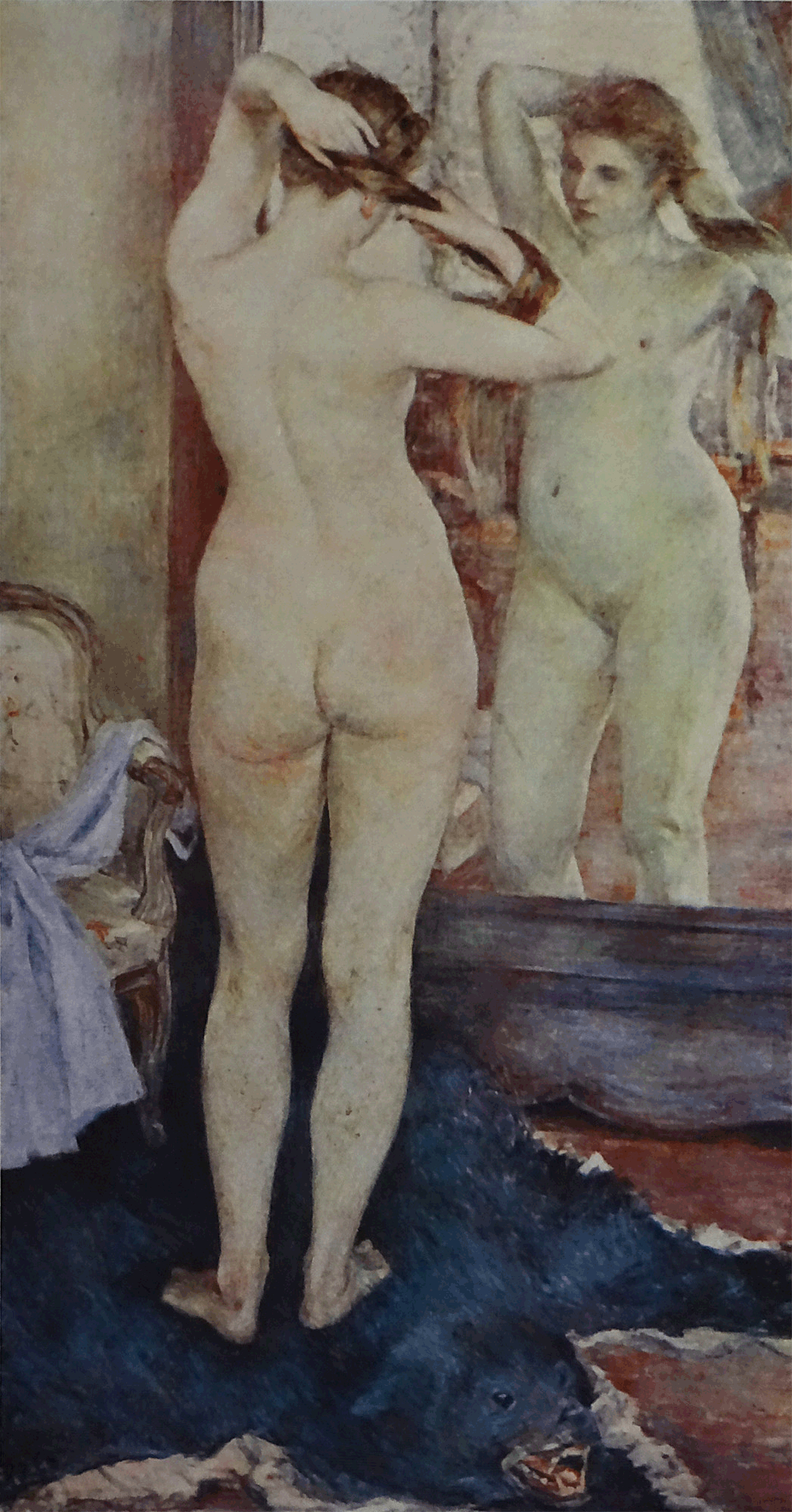
Morning Toilette by Kuroda Seiki

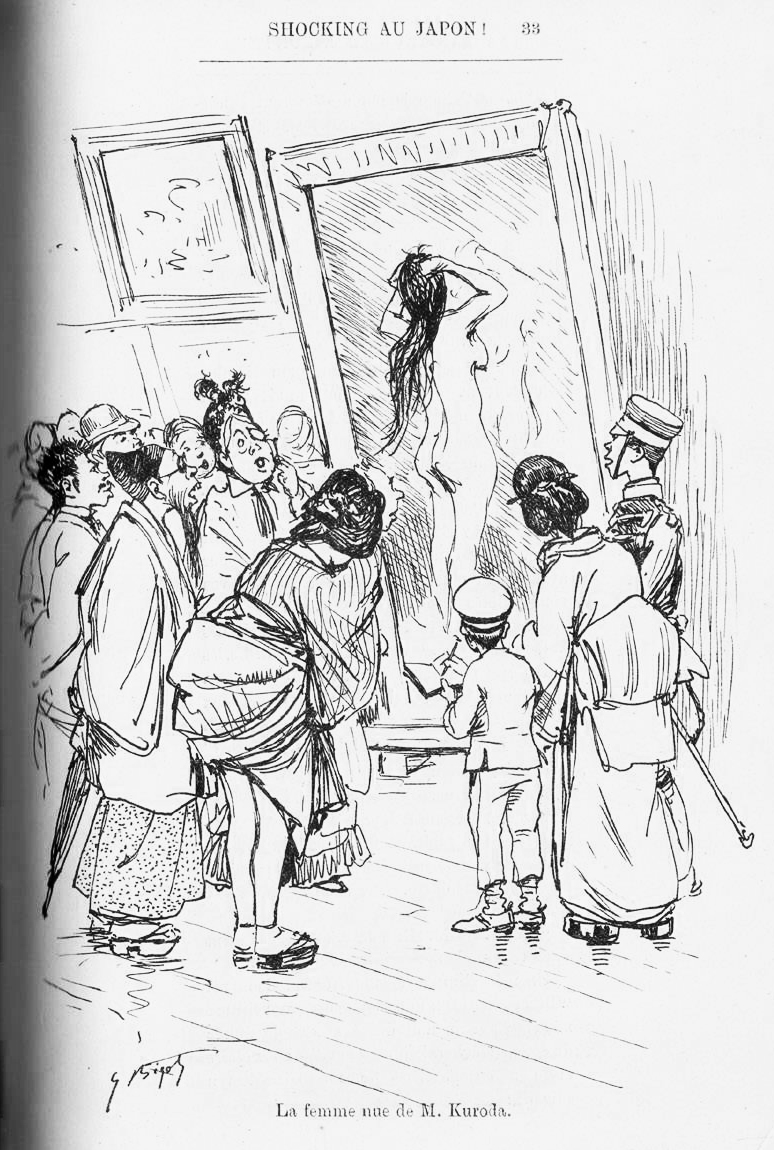
Cartoon of the scandal by Bigot

== Fifth National Industrial Exhibition (1903) ==
Staged in Tennōji-ku, Osaka, from 1 March to 31 July 1903, the fifth and final National Industrial Exhibition ran for 153 days and drew 4,350,693 visitors, an average of 28,436 visitors per day. For the first time, overseas exhibitors were permitted (eight foreign cars featured). There was some controversy over the Human Pavilion (人類館事件).

== Subsequent exhibitions ==
Due to financial constraints after the Russo-Japanese War, a planned sixth National Industrial Exhibition was cancelled, and the next nation-wide initiative of this order was the 1970 Osaka Expo, Japan's first world's fair.

== See also ==
- Yushima Seidō Exhibition
- History of Museums in Japan
- Meiji Restoration
